= List of schools in Rotherham =

This is a list of schools in the Metropolitan Borough of Rotherham in the English county of South Yorkshire.

== State-funded schools ==
=== Primary schools ===
- Anston Brook Primary School, North Anston
- Anston Greenlands Primary School, North Anston
- Anston Hillcrest Primary School, South Anston
- Anston Park Infant School, North Anston
- Anston Park Junior School, North Anston
- Aston All Saints CE Primary School, Aston
- Aston Fence Junior and Infant School, Woodhouse Mill
- Aston Hall Junior and Infant School, Aston
- Aston Lodge Primary School, Aston
- Aughton Junior Academy, Aughton
- Badsley Primary School, East Dene
- Blackburn Primary School, Blackburn
- Bramley Grange Primary School, Bramley
- Bramley Sunnyside Infant School, Bramley
- Bramley Sunnyside Junior School, Bramley
- Brampton Cortonwood Infant School, Brampton Bierlow
- Brampton Ellis CE Primary School, West Melton
- Brinsworth Howarth Primary School, Brinsworth
- Brinsworth Manor Infant School, Brinsworth
- Brinsworth Manor Junior School, Brinsworth
- Brinsworth Whitehill Primary School, Brinsworth
- Brookfield Primary Academy, Swinton
- Broom Valley Community School, Broom
- Canklow Woods Primary School, Canklow
- Catcliffe Primary School, Catcliffe
- Coleridge Primary, Eastwood
- Crags Community School, Maltby
- Dinnington Community Primary School, Dinnington
- East Dene Primary, East Dene
- Eastwood Village Primary School, Eastwood
- Ferham Primary School, Bradgate
- Flanderwell Primary School, Flanderwell
- Foljambe Primary School, Thrybergh
- Greasbrough Primary School, Greasbrough
- Harthill Primary School, Harthill
- Herringthorpe Infant School, Herringthorpe
- Herringthorpe Junior School, Herringthorpe
- Highfield Farm Primary School, West Melton
- High Greave Infant School, East Herringthorpe
- High Greave Junior School, East Herringthorpe
- Kilnhurst Primary School, Kilnhurst
- Kilnhurst St Thomas CE Primary Academy, Kilnhurst
- Kimberworth Community Primary School, Kimberworth
- Kiveton Park Infant School, Kiveton Park
- Kiveton Park Meadows Junior School, Kiveton Park
- Laughton All Saints CE Primary School, Laughton en le Morthen
- Laughton Junior and Infant School, Laughton en le Morthen
- Listerdale Junior Academy, Brecks
- Maltby Lilly Hall Academy, Maltby
- Maltby Manor Academy, Maltby
- Maltby Redwood Academy, Maltby
- Meadow View Primary School, Kimberworth
- Monkwood Primary Academy, Rawmarsh
- Our Lady and St Joseph's RC Primary School, Wath upon Dearne
- Ravenfield Primary Academy, Ravenfield
- Rawmarsh Ashwood Primary School, Parkgate
- Rawmarsh Rosehill Junior School, Rawmarsh
- Rawmarsh Ryecroft Infant School, Rawmarsh
- Rawmarsh Sandhill Primary School, Rawmarsh
- Rawmarsh Thorogate Junior and Infant School, Rawmarsh
- Redscope Primary School, Kimberwood
- Rockingham Junior and Infant School, Wingfield
- Roughwood Primary School, Kimberworth
- St Alban's CE Primary School, Wickersley
- St Ann's Primary School, Eastwood
- St Bede's RC Primary School, Kimberworth
- St Gerard's RC Primary School, Thrybergh
- St Joseph's RC Primary School, Dinnington
- St Joseph's RC Primary School, Rawmarsh
- St Mary's RC Primary School, Herringthorpe
- St Mary's RC Primary School, Maltby
- Sitwell Infant School, Broom
- Sitwell Junior School, Broom
- Springwood Junior Academy, Aston
- Swallownest Primary School, Swallownest
- Swinton Fitzwilliam Primary School, Swinton
- Swinton Queen Primary School, Swinton
- Thornhill Primary School, Bradgate
- Thorpe Hesley Primary School, Thorpe Hesley
- Thrybergh Fullerton CE Primary Academy, Thrybergh
- Thrybergh Primary School, Thrybergh
- Thurcroft Infant School, Thurcroft
- Thurcroft Junior Academy, Thurcroft
- Todwick Primary School, Todwick
- Treeton CE Primary School, Treeton
- Trinity Croft CE Primary Academy, Dalton Parva
- Wales Primary School, Wales
- Wath Central Primary School, Wath upon Dearne
- Wath CE Primary School, Wath upon Dearne
- Wath Victoria Primary School, Wath upon Dearne
- Waverley Junior Academy, Waverley
- Wentworth CE Junior and Infant School, Wentworth
- Whiston Junior and Infant School, Whiston
- Whiston Worrygoose Junior and Infant School, Whiston
- Wickersley Northfield Primary School, Wickersley
- Woodsetts Primary School, Woodsetts

=== Secondary schools ===
- Aston Academy, Swallownest
- Brinsworth Academy, Brinsworth
- Clifton Community School, Clifton
- Dinnington High School, Dinnington
- Maltby Academy, Maltby
- Oakwood High School, Canklow
- Rawmarsh Community School, Rawmarsh
- St Bernard's Catholic High School, Herringthorpe
- Saint Pius X Catholic High School, Wath upon Dearne
- Swinton Academy, Swinton
- Thrybergh Academy, Thrybergh
- Wales High School, Wales
- Wath Academy, Wath upon Dearne
- Wickersley School and Sports College, Wickersley
- Wingfield Academy, Wingfield
- Winterhill School, Kimberworth

=== Special and alternative schools ===
- Abbey School, Kimberworth
- Elements Academy, Dinnington
- Hilltop School, Maltby
- Kelford School, Kimberworth
- Milton School, Swinton
- Newman School, Whiston
- Rotherham Aspire, Rawmarsh
- The Rowan Centre, Rawmarsh
- The Willows School, Thurcroft

=== Further education ===
- Dearne Valley College
- Rotherham College of Arts and Technology
- Thomas Rotherham College

== Independent schools ==
=== Special and alternative schools ===
- Abbeywood School, Hellaby
- Ellern Mede Moorgate School, Broom
