= Oakwood High School, Rotherham =

Oakwood High School

Location
- Moorgate Road; Rotherham, South Yorkshire, S60 2UH; England; 53.41634°N 1.34572°W

Information
- Type: Academy
- Motto: Inspired to Achieve
- Established: 8 September 1952
- Local authority: Rotherham
- Specialist: Technology
- Department for Education URN: 140459 Tables
- Ofsted: Reports
- Chair of Governors: Tracey Briggs
- Head teacher: Phillip Storey
- Staff: 165
- Gender: Mixed
- Age: 11 to 16
- Enrolment: 1,052
- Capacity: 1,050
- Houses: Boston, Hoober, Keppel and Wentworth
- Colours: Blue and grey
- Publication: Oakleaf
- Former names: Oakwood Technical High School for Boys (1952–1960); Oakwood Technical High School for Girls (1953–1960); Oakwood School for Boys (1960–1967); Oakwood School for Girls (1960–1967); The Oakwood School (1967–1975); Oakwood Comprehensive School (1975–1991); Oakwood School (1991–2001); Oakwood Technology College (2001–2012)
- Website: https://www.oakwood.ac/

Oakwood High School is a coeducational secondary school with academy status in Rotherham, South Yorkshire, England, which in 2022 had 1,052 students.

== History ==
Oakwood began life as two separate single-sex 11–18 secondary technical schools. Oakwood Technical High School for Boys, occupying what became the Oaklands end of the school building, opened on 8 September 1952 with 192 first-year students. In 1953, it was joined by Oakwood Technical High School for Girls in what became the Woodlands area of the building. The schools shared catering facilities, making the dining room the divide between the boys' and girls' schools.

The two technical schools were part of central Rotherham's tripartite system of secondary education. Students leaving primary school would take the Eleven plus exam. Those who showed strong academic ability would go to either Rotherham Grammar School if they were male or Rotherham Girls' High School if they were female. Those showing an aptitude for technology would attend one of the Oakwood Technical High Schools. The remainder would attend South Grove Secondary Modern School or Spurley Hey Secondary Modern School. Rotherham was unusual in that it fully implemented the tripartite system; many areas did not build technical schools, making grammar schools or secondary modern schools the only options available.

In 1960, Rotherham scrapped technical schools. Therefore, the Oakwood schools dropped their 'Technical High' tags and became known as Oakwood School for Boys and Oakwood School for Girls. The schools were now semi-comprehensive and took students from the immediate area, rather than those with an aptitude for technology from the whole of Rotherham. The top 12% of students, however, still went to the grammar schools.

In the mid-1960s, central Rotherham moved to a fully comprehensive system, with everyone attending their local school, which was now fully mixed in terms of both ability and gender. As a result of this, the Oakwood boys' and girls' schools amalgamated and became The Oakwood School on 1 February 1967. As part of the reforms, the school lost its sixth form to the new Thomas Rotherham College, which occupies the former Rotherham Grammar School's buildings. There was much controversy about the loss of the sixth form and some staff resigned from the school as a result. Rotherham Girls' High School also lost its sixth form and became Clifton Comprehensive School. South Grove and Spurley Hey secondary moderns, which were already 11–16 schools, also became comprehensives, though both have since closed.

The school was renamed Oakwood Comprehensive School in 1975. For many years, it had separate uniforms for boys and girls, though a single uniform was introduced in the 1970s.

In 1987, the neighbouring South Grove Comprehensive School closed, which extended Oakwood's catchment area further towards the town centre.

In 1991, the school shortened its name to become simply Oakwood School (though the word 'Comprehensive' remained in its official title) and introduced a more modern uniform consisting of shirts based on the new school colours of red and blue. A separate long-sleeved black shirt for Year 11s was introduced much later.

The school was awarded Technology College status in 2001 and changed its name to Oakwood Technology College on 1 September of that year. A new Science department, which looks out onto the main road, was completed in 2002.

The school introduced vertical tutorship in September 2005, with forms organised into five houses named after trees: Aspen, Beech, Larch, Rowan and Willow.

At the beginning of the school's 2012–2013 academic year on 25 June 2012, Oakwood Technology College rebranded itself Oakwood High School. The school's colours were changed from red and blue to blue and grey. In addition, a new school logo was introduced, dropping the oak tree that had been used for 21 years. A new uniform, consisting of grey (black for Year 11) jumpers/cardigans, white shirts and house ties, was also phased in. From September 2015, a black blazer was added to the uniform. The logo was updated slightly in summer 2019 to remove the stylised 'O', which was sometimes mistaken for a 'C'.

Starting in July 2013, all students were issued with an iPad mini to aid their learning.

On 1 December 2013, the school converted to academy status.

Oakwood was used as a filming location for the BBC adaptation of David Walliams' Billionaire Boy, broadcast on New Year's Day 2016. The school was used as the set of Ruffington High School, with filming taking place in October 2015. Some of the school's students and staff played extras.

The school underwent a complete rebuild between January 2015 and July 2016 under the Government's Priority Schools Building Programme. (The school was previously set to be re-built under the Building Schools for the Future (BSF) programme between 2011 and 2013, but this was abandoned in 2010 when the Government cancelled the entire BSF scheme.) The new three-storey building opened in September 2016.

In preparation for the new building opening, the school switched from six 50-minute lessons a day to four 75-minute lessons a day. The house system was also overhauled, with the number of houses being reduced to four. The new houses are all named after local landmarks: Boston, Hoober, Keppel and Wentworth. As under the old house system, each house has its own tie.

== Charitable events ==
For the several years, Oakwood has raised funds for the BBC charity Children in Need. The school has been featured on regional news broadcasts and the BBC Children in Need show itself.

The school hosts an annual Children in Need Concert, in which students from Years 7-11, teachers and ex-students, showcase their talents, whether they lie in music, singing and dancing, dance or drama. Recently, performances have included Rotherham Ethnic Drumming, which originated from Oakwood's own African drumming group, the GCSE Drama and BTEC Performing Arts groups, and the 'Bondathon', arranged and performed in 2007 by Year 11 students.

In addition to this, the school holds an afternoon of fund raising activities which include sponsorship, jumble sales, coffee mornings and cake sales.

Each year, the school raises several thousands of pounds, which all goes to Children in Need.

== Oakwood Real Ale and Music Festival ==
From 1992 to 2010, the school hosted the Oakwood Real Ale and Music Festival, which took place in the February half-term each year. Money raised from the festival went directly to the school. In 2011, the festival moved to the Magna Science Adventure Centre and renamed the Rotherham Real Ale and Music Festival.

The festival was staffed by volunteers, including past and present members of the school's staff, former pupils, and local members of CAMRA.

== Feeder schools ==
Oakwood's three associated primary schools are Sitwell Junior School, Broom Valley Community School and Canklow Woods Primary School.

In addition, the school receives a notable number of students from Herringthorpe Junior School, Whiston Junior and Infant School and a number of other schools around the central Rotherham area.

== Progression to further education ==
As Oakwood does not have its own sixth form, the majority of Oakwood's students embark on their post-16 education at the neighbouring Thomas Rotherham College for academic courses or Rotherham College of Arts and Technology for vocational courses. A significant minority attend Wickersley School and Sports College's sixth form.

== Conversion to a Multi Academy Trust ==
Oakwood High School was granted an Academy Order on 1 August 2013 and converted to Academy status for the Academic Year 2013/2014. In November 2013, Oakwood transitioned to a Multi Academy Trust, to enable it to expand and support other schools. The Multi Academy Trust was initially known as the Oakwood Learning Community In June 2014 one of its feeder schools, Sitwell Junior School, joined the Multi Academy Trust with David Naisbitt as the Accounting Officer. In February 2016 the Multi Academy Trust changed its name to Inspire Trust, echoing Oakwood's new strap-line "Inspired to Achieve". By October 2017, the Inspire Trust had grown further, with the addition of the Thomas Rotherham College, which dissolved the Corporation of Thomas Rotherham College, reopening as a 6th Form Academy, within the Inspire Trust family.

== Ofsted inspections ==
Since the commencement of Ofsted inspections in September 1993, the school has undergone seven inspections:

Date of inspection	Outcome	Reference
25–?? September 1995	Very good	
2–4 December 2002	Very good	Report
27–28 September 2006	Satisfactory	Report
2–3 December 2009	Satisfactory	Report
18–19 December 2012	Good	Report
27 September 2016	Good	Report
9–10 November 2021	Good	Report

== Headteachers ==
=== Boys' school ===
- Frank Dixon, September 1952–January 1967

=== Girls' school ===
- Phyllis Cater, September 1953–January 1967 (continued as head of the merged school)

=== Mixed school ===
- Phyllis Cater, February 1967–December 1971 (previously head of the girls' school)
- David Rigby, January 1972–December 1990
- Jan Charters, January 1991–August 2008
- David Naisbitt, September 2008–August 2021
- Chris Eccles, September 2021–August 2025
- Phillip Storey, September 2025–present

== Notable former pupils ==
- Dean Andrews (1975–1979), actor
- Nick Banks (1976–1981), drummer in Pulp
- Nigel Croft (1967–1972), Chairman of the ISO Joint Technical Coordination Group for Management System Standards, including ISO 9000 and ISO 14000
- Justine Greening (1980–1985), former Conservative MP and Cabinet minister
- John Hampshire, England and Yorkshire cricketer
- James May (1974–1979), broadcaster and journalist
- Gervase Phinn (sixth form only, 1964–1966), author
- Sir Mike Tomlinson, former Chief Inspector of Schools in England
