= Rotherham Interchange =

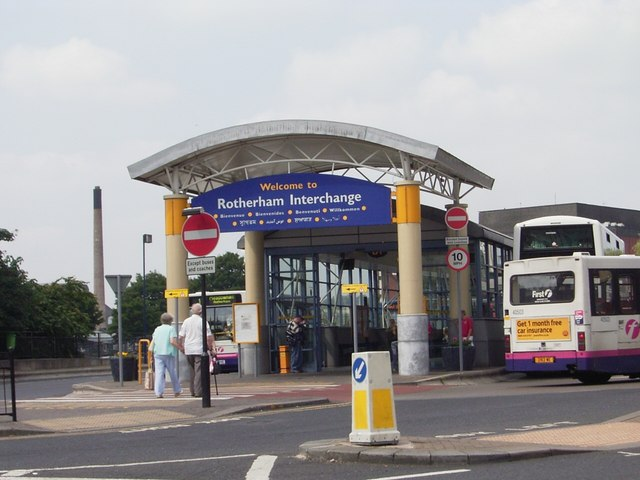

General information
- Location: Frederick Street, Rotherham town centre Rotherham (S60 1QB); England
- Coordinates: 53.4336°N 1.3567°W
- Owner: South Yorkshire Passenger Transport Executive
- Operator: Travel South Yorkshire
- Bus stands: 24
- Bus operators: Cawthorne's Travel, Globe Holidays, First South Yorkshire, National Express, South Pennine Community Transport, Stagecoach East Midlands, Stagecoach Yorkshire, TM Travel
- Connections: Rotherham Central station (400 m (1,300 ft))

Construction
- Parking: Yes
- Cycle facilities: Yes
- Accessible: Yes

History
- Rebuilt: 2018–2019
Location

Rotherham Interchange is a bus station serving the town of Rotherham, South Yorkshire. It consists of 24 bus stands located inside the main Interchange building in Rotherham town centre, next to the College Walk shopping centre which leads out onto Frederick Street. It is the main hub for bus services in the Rotherham area, and is located a short walk over the Chantry Bridge over the River Don from Rotherham Central station on the National Rail and Sheffield Supertram networks.

== History ==
On 15 May 2016 the Interchange suffered major damage after a Stagecoach bus caught fire inside the building in a suspected arson attack. The bus station was closed for several days before reopening after temporary repairs were made.

On 29 April 2018, the bus station was closed for more permanent repairs and a full refurbishment costing £12 million; it reopened on 3 March 2019. During the closure of Rotherham Interchange, bus services departed from Greasbrough Road and a temporary bus station on the site of the former Forge Island Tesco supermarket.

== Services ==
As of July 2026, the stand allocation is:

Stand	Route	Destination
A1	X3	Doncaster via Thrybergh, Conisbrough & Balby (First South Yorkshire)
A1	X6	Sheffield via Canklow, J33 Services & Sheffield Parkway (First South Yorkshire)
A2	-	No Services Allocated
A3	22X	Barnsley via Parkgate, Rawmarsh, Swinton, Manvers, Wath, Brampton, Wombwell & Stairfoot (Stagecoach Yorkshire)
A3	216	Cortonwood via Rawmarsh, Swinton, Mexborough, Manvers & Wath (Stagecoach Yorkshire)
A3	217	Barnsley via Rawmarsh, Wentworth Road, Mexborough, Manvers, Goldthorpe, Darfield & Ardsley (Stagecoach Yorkshire)
A3	218	Barnsley via Rawmarsh, Swinton, Mexborough, Manvers, Goldthorpe, Darfield & Ardsley (Stagecoach Yorkshire)
A4	8	Upper Haugh via Rawmarsh (Stagecoach Yorkshire)
A4	8A	Upper Haugh via Rawmarsh & Thorogate (Stagecoach Yorkshire)
A4	108	Upper Haugh via Rawmarsh & Symonds Avenue (Stagecoach Yorkshire)
A4	221	Doncaster via Parkgate, Rawmarsh, Swinton, Mexborough, Denaby Main, Conisbrough, Warmsworth & Balby (Stagecoach Yorkshire)
A5	9	Rawmarsh via Kilnhurst Road (Stagecoach Yorkshire)
A5	109	Upper Haugh via Rawmarsh, Kilnhurst Road & Thorogate (Stagecoach Yorkshire)
A5	208	Grimethorpe via Parkgate, Rawmarsh, Swinton, Mexborough, Bolton, Goldthorpe & GXO Logistics (Stagecoach)
A6	20	Dinnington Interchange via Rotherham General Hospital, Ulley, Thurcroft, Laughton Common & Woodsetts (TM Travel)
A6	207	Sheffield via Brinsworth, Whiston, Tinsley, Carbrook & Attercliffe (First South Yorkshire)
A7	19	Worksop via Rotherham General Hospital, Wickersley, Thurcroft, Laughton Common, Dinnington, North Anston, South Anston & Gateford (Stagecoach East Midlands)
A7	19A	Worksop via Rotherham General Hospital, Wickersley, Thurcroft, Laughton Common, Dinnington, North Anston, Woodsetts, Lindrick Common & Gateford (Stagecoach East Midlands)
A8	3	Ravenfield Common via Parkgate, Broom Valley, Wickersley & Flanderwell (Cawthorne's Travel)
A8	21	Harthill via Rotherham General Hospital, Whiston, Aughton, Swallownest, Aston, Wales, Kiveton Park & Todwick (Stagecoach Yorkshire)
A8	21S	Thomas Rotherham College (Cawthorne's Travel)
A9	X1	Maltby via Wickersley & Bramley (First South Yorkshire)
A9	X2	Doncaster via Wickersley, Bramley, Maltby, Braithwell, Edlington & Balby (First South Yorkshire)
A10	117	Bramley via Eastwood, Dalton & Sunnyside (TM Travel)
A10	139	Wingfield via Kimberworth Park (First South Yorkshire)
A10	141	Wingfield via Kimberworth Park (First South Yorkshire)
B1	114	Herringthorpe via Clifton & East Dene (First South Yorkshire)
B1	115	East Herringthorpe via Clifton & East Dene (First South Yorkshire)
B1	116	Ravenfield Common via Clifton, East Dene, Dalton & Thrybergh (First South Yorkshire)
B2	114	Herringthorpe via Clifton & East Dene (Stagecoach Yorkshire)
B2	114A	Herringthorpe via Clifton, East Dene & Herringthorpe Lane (Stagecoach Yorkshire)
B3	-	No Services Allocated
B4	135	Chapeltown via Masbrough, Kimberworth & Thorpe Hesley (Stagecoach Yorkshire)
B4	137	Sheffield via Masbrough, Kimberworth, Blackburn, Wincobank, Meadowhall, Burngreave & Grimesthorpe (Stagecoach Yorkshire)
B4	137A	Meadowhall via Masbrough, Holmes, Kimberworth, Richmond & Blackburn (Stagecoach Yorkshire)
B4	138	Kimberworth Park via Masbrough (Stagecoach Yorkshire)
B5	7	Barnsley via Greasbrough, Wentworth, Elsecar, Hoyland, Blacker Hill & Stairfoot (Globe Holidays)
B6	X1	Sheffield via Meadowhall & Brightside (First South Yorkshire)
B6	X2	Sheffield via Meadowhall & Brightside (First South Yorkshire)
B7	44	Chapeltown via Kimberworth, Droppingwell, Scholes, Thorpe Hesley, Wentworth & Harley Road (South Pennine Community Transport)
B7	107	Swinton via Greasbrough & Upper Haugh (South Pennine Community Transport)
B7	X3	Sheffield via Meadowhall & Brightside (First South Yorkshire)
B8	73	Sheffield via Canklow, Brinsworth, Treeton, Catcliffe, Waverley, Handsworth, Richmond, Manor Top, Arbourthorne, Heeley & Bramall Lane (First South Yorkshire)
B8	95	Walkley via Canklow, Brinsworth, Treeton, Catcliffe, Waverley, Handsworth, Sheffield Parkway, Sheffield City Centre, West Street & Commonside (First South Yorkshire)
B9	140	Kimberworth Park via Greasbrough (First South Yorkshire)
B9	142	Kimberworth Park via Parkgate & Roughwood Road (First South Yorkshire)
B10	-	No Services Allocated
C1	–	
C2	–	
C3	–	
C4	–	
