= South Grove Comprehensive School =

Coordinates: 53.42672°N 1.35476°W

Location
- Moorgate Road; Rotherham, South Yorkshire; England

Information
- Type: County school
- Established: September 1911
- Closed: 31 August 1987
- Local authority: Rotherham
- Gender: Mixed
- Age: 11 to 16

South Grove Comprehensive School was a secondary school in Rotherham, England that existed, in various guises, from 1911 until 1987.

== History ==
The Education Act 1902 transferred responsibility for schools from school boards to councils. At the behest of Spurley Hey, Rotherham's first Director of Education, Rotherham began expanding its senior provision. Therefore, it was decided to open two new single sex schools, serving 11-14 year olds, in a Victorian building on Moorgate Road that was originally a private house, but had been a teacher training college since 1901. The schools opened in 1911.

South Grove Central School for Girls occupied the ground floor, while South Grove Central School for Boys occupied the first floor.

After the Education Act 1944, the schools became secondary modern schools. Students in the area who passed the Eleven-Plus exam went to either Rotherham Grammar School or Rotherham Girls' High School, while those showing an aptitude for technology went to Oakwood Technical High School for Boys/Girls. The remaining students attended South Grove Secondary Modern School for Boys/Girls, which now took students up to the age of 16. The two schools merged in 1961. Later, it became the first secondary modern in Rotherham to offer O Levels its students.

In the mid-1960s, Rotherham moved to a fully comprehensive system. The school was renamed South Grove Comprehensive School around 1967 and now took students of all abilities from the local area.

The school closed in 1987, with the students and many of the staff transferring to the neighbouring Oakwood Comprehensive School.

The buildings remained until 2003, when they demolished and replaced by a modern office building complex, known as Moorgate Crofts.

== Notable alumni ==
- Gervase Phinn, author (1959-1964)
- Norman Bettison, formerly Chief Constable of West Yorkshire Police, and of Merseyside Police, implicated in the Hillsborough Disaster cover-up.
