= Nigel Howard Croft =

British standards authority (born 1956)

Nigel Howard Croft (born 1956 in Rotherham, South Yorkshire, UK) is a globally recognized authority on quality management and conformity assessment. He retired as Chairman of the ISO Joint Technical Coordination Group for Management System Standards in December 2023 after serving a three-year term, having been appointed by ISO's Technical Management Board in December 2020. During his tenure, he coordinated the deployment of the ISO London Declaration on Climate Action into all ISO Management System Standards, requiring organizations that implement these standards to determine the extent to which climate change can affect their results and the ways in which their activities can have a (positive or negative) impact on climate change. This can then lead to the implementation of risk-based adaptation and mitigation strategies. Dr Croft was previously Chair of the ISO Technical Committee TC 176/SC 2 from February 2010 until December 2018, with overall responsibility for the ISO 9001 standard, used worldwide as a basis for certification of quality management systems, and the ISO 9004 guidelines standard aimed at improving organisational performance, among others. In 2019 and 2020 he led the revision of "Annex SL" of the ISO Directives, that forms the basis for over 40 management system standards including those on environmental management (ISO 14001), Occupational Health and Safety (ISO 45001), Information Security (ISO/IEC 27001), Anti-bribery (ISO 37001), Food Safety (ISO 22000), Artificial Intelligence (ISO/IEC 42001) and many more.

== Education ==
Nigel Croft attended Oakwood Comprehensive School, Rotherham from 1967 to 1972 and subsequently Thomas Rotherham College (formerly Rotherham Grammar School). First in his family to go to university, he graduated with First Class Honours in Natural Sciences and with an Honorary Senior Scholarship from Gonville and Caius College, Cambridge in 1977. After a short period in industry, he returned to academia to carry out postgraduate research in Metallurgy and Materials Science at Sheffield University under the tutelage of Prof Sir Graeme Davies. He received a PhD in 1981 for his work on the fracture characteristics and mechanisms in cast steel, and was awarded the Brunton Medal for Research Excellence. In 1981, he received a Harkness Fellowship from the Commonwealth Fund, to conduct post-doctoral research at the University of California, Berkeley, on the low temperature impact strength of welds in microalloyed steel after induction bending for use in high pressure gas pipelines.

== Career ==
Following a family tradition, Nigel Croft began his career in the local South Yorkshire steel industry, at British Steel Corporation’s Special Steels Division in Rotherham. He began work in the quality control department in 1974, first as a student apprentice, and later as a Graduate Metallurgist. After returning from post-doctoral research work in the US, he joined J.P. Kenny and Partners as a Senior Metallurgist, working on supplier evaluations for high pressure gas pipelines in the North Sea and elsewhere. In 1984 he married Naila Diniz (also a PhD metallurgist from Sheffield University), and emigrated to Brazil. The two worked in the Diniz family-owned specialty steel company Eletrometal S.A. until the company was sold in the mid-1990s, and became known as Villares Metals, part of the Voest-Alpine Group of companies. Nigel's interest in Quality Management began during this time, when he coordinated the adaptation of Eletrometal's quality management system to meet the requirements of the ISO 9002 standard (now superseded), in 1992.

Nigel Croft currently sits on the Board of a number of organizations around the world, and in 2011 he was appointed visiting professor at the Business School of UUM (University of Northern Malaysia)

== Contribution to International Standards ==
As a member of the Brazilian delegation to ISO/TC176, the ISO Technical Committee responsible for Quality Management and the ISO 9000 family of standards, Nigel Croft was responsible for coordinating the implementation of and transition to the year 2000 revision of those standards. After over 15 years of active involvement with ISO/TC 176, he was appointed as Chairman of its Subcommittee SC 2 in 2010, with responsibility for the ISO 9001 requirements standard and the ISO 9004 guidelines standard, among others. ISO/TC 176/SC 2 has participation from over 80 countries represented via their National Standards Bodies, as well as liaison organisations representing industry groups and other interested parties. There are now over 1,000,000 organisations worldwide that are certified as meeting ISO 9001, which sets out requirements for organisations to be able to demonstrate their ability to consistently provide their customers with conforming products and services. During his tenure, he provided overall leadership for the major revision of ISO 9001, published in 2015, the ISO Technical Specification ISO/TS 9002:2016 (Guidance on the Application of ISO 9001:2015), the ISO guide "ISO 9001:2015 for small enterprises - What to do?", also published in 2016 and ISO 9004:2018 ("Quality of an organisation — Guidance to achieve sustained success").

ISO 9001 was the first of many management system standards published by ISO. Others include ISO 14001 (Environmental Management), ISO 22000 (Food Safety Management), ISO 27001 (Information Security Management), ISO 37001 (Anti-Bribery Management) and ISO 45001 (Occupational Health & Safety Management). In order to ensure alignment and consistency of these standards, and to facilitate their implementation in an integrated manner by all kinds of organizations, in 2012 ISO published a set of rules ("Annex SL" to the ISO Directives ) to apply to all new management system standards and revisions to existing ones. After completing his term of office as chair of ISO/TC 176/SC 2 in December 2018, Nigel Croft was appointed as convener of the ISO Joint Technical Coordination Group Task Force responsible for the revision of these rules, which were subsequently published in the May 2021 version of the ISO/IEC Directives.

== Awards ==
In 2017, Croft was awarded the American Society for Quality's Freund-Marquardt medal, with a citation that reads “For his passion, dedication and leadership in the application of quality management principles to the development, promotion and implementation of quality management system standards on a global scale, for over twenty years”, and in 2018 an Honorary Award from the UK's Chartered Quality Institute. According to the CQI website: "This award recognises those who have moved the quality profession or the quality discipline forward over a number of years. Nigel won this award for his substantial contribution to the evolution of the ISO 9000 family – the world’s most popular set of quality management standards. His leadership on the development of ISO 9001, among other major standards, has given companies worldwide the tools to drive improvement and embed quality across all aspects of the business".

== Publications ==
- "Standards and public policy: A toolkit for national standards bodies" (with M. Peet and R. Lawson) International Organization for Standardization, Geneva, 2023
- "Benefits and challenges of remote conformity assessment" Chartered Quality Institute, February 2023
- "Smart Quality Infrastructure - Shaping a sustainable future" (with D. Gerundino and L. Colombo), ISBN 978-3-200-08771-2, United Nations Industrial Development Organization, Vienna, Austria, 2022
- "Remote Conformity Assessment in a Digital World - Opportunities, Challenges and Implications for Developing Countries” United Nations Industrial Development Organization, Vienna, Austria, 2022
- “Trust but Verify – Managing Supply Chain Risks” (with E.J. Fletcher) Offshore Technology Conference Proceedings p2634, Houston, USA, May, 2022.
- "Quality Policy - A Practical Tool" United Nations Industrial Development Organization, Vienna, Austria, 2022
- “Supply Chains and ISO 9001 – What to expect and How to get it” ISO Focus (April 2010)
- “ISO 9001:2008 – Small Changes, Big Opportunities”, ISBN 978-0-615-30139-6, published by Sustainable Success Alert (USA)
- “Preserving the credibility of ISO 9001:2000 certification” (with R. Dougherty) ISO Management Systems (Sept/Oct 2007)
- “ISO 9001:2000 – What does it mean in the Supply Chain?” ISO Management Systems (April/May 2005)
- “Credibility and Integrity of the ISO 9000 Standards” – ISO Management Systems (March/April 2003)
- “The ISO 9000:2000 standards – some common misconceptions”, EOQ 46th Congress, Harrogate, UK, Oct 2002
- American Society for Quality ISO 9000 Handbook (Author of Chapters 19 and 42), 2001
- “Revving up Health Care, US Style”, Quality World, July 2001
- “ISO 9000:2000 – A lesson in peace processes” Quality World, Dec 2000
