= Listed buildings in Bramley, Rotherham =

Bramley is a civil parish in the Metropolitan Borough of Rotherham, South Yorkshire, England. The parish contains five listed buildings that are recorded in the National Heritage List for England. All the listed buildings are designated at Grade II, the lowest of the three grades, which is applied to "buildings of national importance and special interest". The parish contains the village of Bramley and the surrounding area, and all the listed buildings are houses, one converted from a chapel.

== Buildings ==
Name and location	Photograph	Date	Notes
Bramley Grange and Bramley Grange Farmhouse; 53.42968°N 1.26150°W	—	16th century	A house and an attached farmhouse with a timber framed core, encased in sandstone in the 17th century, refronted in about 1700, and a wing added in the 18th century. There are two storeys, the house has a front of five bays and two bays on the sides, and a rear range of three storeys and three bays. The main range has a chamfered plinth, quoins, a coped parapet with a false gable and a finial, and a hipped Welsh slate roof. The central doorway has a moulded surround, a keystone with a carved rosette, and a segmental pediment on consoles. The windows are casements with architraves and hood moulds, the middle window in the upper floor with a rusticated surround. In the farmhouse is a curved bay window, and the other windows are sashes.
Warren House; 53.42634°N 1.26662°W	—	Late 17th century	A sandstone house with quoins, boxed eaves, and a roof of tile and pantile with coped gables and shaped kneelers. There are two storeys and an attic, and a T-shaped plan, consisting of a front range of four bays and a rear wing. The doorway has a chamfered quoined surround, and the windows on the front are sashes. In the left return are two-light mullioned windows.
12 Flanderwell Lane; 53.42776°N 1.26819°W	—	Mid 18th century	A house later used as an outbuilding, it is in sandstone, with quoins, stone slate eaves courses, and a pantile roof with chamfered gable copings and shaped kneelers. There are two storeys and two bays. The doorway has a quoined surround and a cut-out to the soffit of the lintel, and the windows are casements.
Stonecroft; 53.42720°N 1.26714°W	—	18th century	A row of cottages converted into a house in the 20th century, in sandstone, with chamfered quoins, and a slate roof with coped gables and kneelers. There are two storeys, and a T-shaped plan, with a front of four bays, the middle two bays under a gable, and a rear wing. In the centre is a doorway with a rusticated surround and a cornice, and the windows are casements, in the outer bays the upper windows rising as half-dormers.
The Warren; 53.42629°N 1.26704°W	—	1785	A Methodist chapel converted into a house in about 1975. It is in sandstone, on a plinth, with a hipped slate roof. There are two storeys and an L-shaped plan, the chapel with fronts of two and three bays, and a rear cross-wing on the left. The chapel doorway has a porch with a cornice, and an inscribed frieze over which is an oculus. It is flanked by windows, blind apart from semicircular fanlights. Elsewhere, the windows are casements, and the wing has a coped gable.
