= Canklow =

Suburb of Rotherham, South Yorkshire, England

Coordinates: 53.417°N 1.360°W

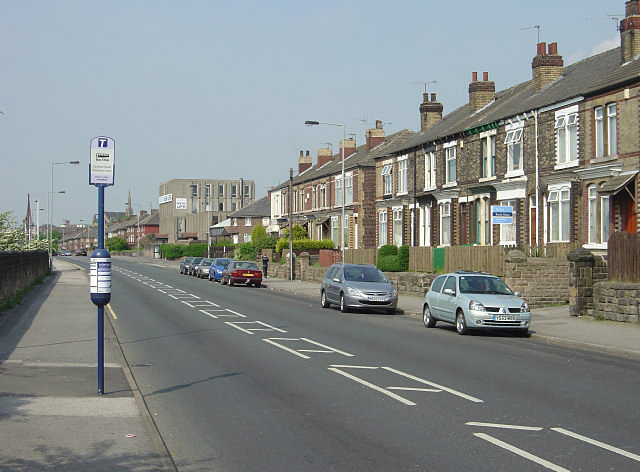
- Canklow Road, the main street of the settlement

- Location within South Yorkshire
- Population: 1,463 (2001)
- OS grid reference: SK425914
  - London: 140 mi (230 km) SSE
- Metropolitan borough: Rotherham
- Metropolitan county: South Yorkshire
- Region: Yorkshire and the Humber
- Country: England
- Sovereign state: United Kingdom
- Post town: ROTHERHAM
- Postcode district: S60
- Dialling code: 01709
- Police: South Yorkshire
- Fire: South Yorkshire
- Ambulance: Yorkshire
- UK Parliament: Rotherham

Canklow is a suburb of Rotherham, South Yorkshire, England. Canklow is less than 1 mile (1.6 km) south from Rotherham town centre and approximately 4 miles (6 km) north-east from Sheffield city centre. It forms part of the Boston Castle ward for the Metropolitan Borough of Rotherham.

== History ==
Canklow was created as a post Second World War council housing area. At the southern end of the estate there was once a coal mine, Rotherham Main Colliery. The mine opened in 1890 and closed in 1954.

In 1981 the census revealed a male unemployment rate for Canklow of 42.1%, just under four times the national average.

From 1983 to 1986 Canklow was one of four areas in South Yorkshire where the Probation Service ran a victim/offender mediation project (one of the first of its kind in the country). The area at the time suffered high unemployment, a heroin problem and a suicide rate well above the high average

== Landmarks ==
Education in the local area is provided by Canklow Woods Primary School and Oakwood High School.

There was a church in Canklow, but has now been converted to a sofa shop.

St Lukes was a church at the top of the field running parallel to Castle Avenue. It was a daughter church to All Saints Parish Church
