= Bramley, Rotherham =

Village and civil parish in South Yorkshire, England

Coordinates: 53.4253°N 1.2648°W

Bramley
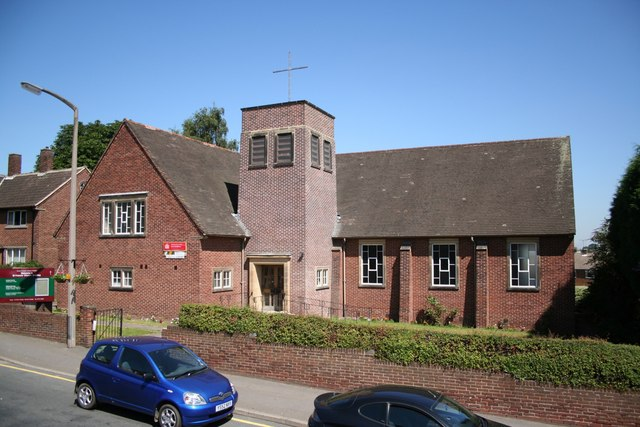
- St. Francis church on Main Street

- Location within South Yorkshire
- Population: 8,194
- OS grid reference: SK487937
  - London: 140 mi (230 km) SSE
- Civil parish: Bramley
- Metropolitan borough: Rotherham
- Metropolitan county: South Yorkshire
- Region: Yorkshire and the Humber
- Country: England
- Sovereign state: United Kingdom
- Post town: ROTHERHAM
- Postcode district: S66
- Police: South Yorkshire
- Fire: South Yorkshire
- Ambulance: Yorkshire
- UK Parliament: Wentworth and Dearne

Bramley is a village and civil parish of the Metropolitan Borough of Rotherham in South Yorkshire, England.

The village is situated approximately 4 miles (6 km) from central Rotherham and 8 miles (13 km) from Sheffield city centre, both to the west south-west.

Bramley is bordered by the urban development of Sunnyside conjoined to the village of Wickersley to the south, and the village of Ravenfield to the north. To the east, beyond Junction 1 of the M18, are the civil parishes of Hellaby (formerly part of Bramley) and Maltby.

The name Bramley derives from the Old English brōmlēah meaning 'broom wood or clearing'. It was recorded in the Domesday Book as Bramelei.

== Community ==
According to the 2001 census the parish had a population of 8,194.

There are no secondary schools in Bramley. Pupils aged 11–18 mostly attend nearby Wickersley School and Sports College which is situated in Wickersley on its border with Bramley. Other pupils also attend Maltby School or Thrybergh School, while others attend St Bernard's Catholic High School, Rotherham.

Buses through Bramley from Rotherham run to Maltby, Ravenfield, Mexborough, Hooton Levitt and Dinnington.

== See also ==
- Listed buildings in Bramley, Rotherham
