= Spurley Hey Comprehensive School =

Location
- Cranworth Road; Rotherham, South Yorkshire, S65 1LN; England

Information
- Type: County school
- Established: September 1931
- Closed: August 31, 1991
- Local authority: Rotherham
- Department for Education URN: 127634 Tables
- Age: 11 to 16

Spurley Hey Comprehensive School was a school in Rotherham, open between 1931 and 1991.

== History ==
Originally, the institution was two schools, Spurley Hey Central School for Boys and Spurley Hey Central School for Girls. Both opened in 1931 and were named after Spurley Hey, Rotherham's former Director of Education.

The two schools later became secondary moderns. They merged to form a mixed school in 1965, which soon became a comprehensive.

The school closed in 1991. All the students and some of the staff transferred to Clifton Comprehensive School. Due to the increase in numbers at Clifton, the former Spurley Hey site was used as the upper site of Clifton until 2005.

== Notable pupils ==
- Nazir Ahmed, Baron Ahmed
