= Laura Jane Suisted =

New Zealand writer and journalist

- Born: Laura Eyre; 1 January 1840; Greasbrough, Yorkshire, England
- Died: 7 September 1903 (aged 63); Westport, New Zealand
- Occupation: Journalist
- Spouse: James Suisted (m. 1864)
- Writing career
- Pen name: Scribbler

Laura Jane Suisted (born Laura Eyre; 1 January 1840 – 7 September 1903) was a New Zealand writer, journalist and parliamentary reporter. She is regarded as a pioneer women journalist in New Zealand.

== Biography ==
Suisted was born in Greasbrough, Yorkshire, England, on 1 January 1840. She was the only child of plumber Abel Eyre and his wife, Mary Lee.

In 1862, Suisted moved to Dunedin, where she met and married station manager James Samuel Suisted. After several failed business ventures in different parts of the country, the couple moved to Westport. There, James was more successful as business man and they settled permanently, staying in the town for the rest of their lives.

== Career ==
Suisted built her career as a writer, while her husband became a businessperson and served as mayor of Westport on two occasions. In 1878, the Otago Witness began publishing her stories, poems and sketches. From 1884, she was a political reporter, the first woman to do so. Her stories were published by the Otago Witness and wider afield in New Zealand and Australia.

=== Memberships ===
- New Zealand Institute of Journalists
- Royal Geographical Society of Australasia
- British Institute of Journalists
- Incorporated Society of Authors, London

== Trip to England and Scandinavia ==
In 1893, Suisted travelled alone to England and Scandinavia. When friends expressed concern at her travelling alone (at a time when few women did), she replied 'That depends on the lady'. While in England, she attended the opening of the Imperial Institute and viewed the House of Lords. In Scandinavia, she visited Otto Nordenskjöld, the Arctic explorer.

While away, she wrote about her travels and these were published in the New Zealand newspapers. She also published a book, From New Zealand to Norway, upon her return.

== Death ==
Suisted died in Westport on 7 September 1903, and she was buried in the Orowaiti Old Cemetery. Her husband remarried in 1904, and died in 1910.
