= Rotherham Main Colliery =

Former coal mine in South Yorkshire, England

Coordinates: 53°24′38″N 1°21′44″W

Rotherham Main Colliery was situated in Canklow, about 1.5 miles south of Rotherham town centre in the Rother Valley. The area was the site of an ancient crossing of the river set below the crag on which were Canklow Woods, an ancient woodland area.

== History ==
The first shaft was commenced in 1890 with the pit going into production in 1894. The owners of the colliery and later the coke ovens and by-products plant were Sheffield-based steel makers John Brown and Company who also built houses for their workers and a school for the children of the colliers.

An accident occurred in 1891 when 8 miners fell 60 feet (18 m) from their wooden platform.

The colliery had problems, the area was prone to flooding but prior to the First World War it employed around 2,000 miners. Following the General Strike in 1926 the colliery was virtually closed and needed just 300 employees to maintain it.

The colliery closed in 1954 and nowadays there are no signs of its existence, the last of what did remain being swept away under a road scheme which followed the Rother Valley linking the town's relief road to the M1 via Rother Way to Junction 33.

== The Railway Connection ==
The colliery was linked to the main railway network by a branch line from the Manchester, Sheffield and Lincolnshire Railway at a junction known as "Rotherham Main", situated about 0.75 miles (1.2 km) on the Sheffield side of Rotherham Central.

This branch line was also the subject of an agreement between the Great Central Railway Company and steel makers Steel, Peech and Tozer giving access to the steel company's locomotives and wagons across the main line tracks and to tip furnace waste (slag etc.) on land adjacent to the line.
