= Norman Bettison =

Former police officer (born 1956)

Sir Norman Bettison QPM
- Born: Norman George Bettison; 3 January 1956 (age 70); Rotherham, West Riding of Yorkshire, England
- Occupation: Retired Police Officer ACPO
- Title: Chief Constable

Sir Norman George Bettison, QPM (born 3 January 1956) is a British former police officer and the former Chief Constable of Merseyside Police and West Yorkshire Police. He resigned in October 2012 amidst controversy about his role in the Hillsborough disaster, in which he was involved in the implementation of a cover-up of police errors. He remained the subject of an Independent Police Complaints Commission (IPCC) investigation, and was charged on the 28 June 2017 with four counts of misconduct in public office. The case was dropped on 21 August 2018. Bettison's own book Hillsborough Untold (2016) contains his version of events.

== Early life ==
Bettison was born in Rotherham, West Riding of Yorkshire, on 3 January 1956, the son of George Bettison, a steelworker, and Betty Heathcote. He married Patricia Favell in Rotherham in 1976.

Bettison said that he attended football matches as a spectator from time to time, following Sheffield Wednesday. He described his experience as a 14-year-old boy watching Sheffield Wednesday vs. Manchester City on 22 April 1970 from the Leppings Lane terraces at Hillsborough stadium:

... the terraces had become so full ... there was no room to move ... I remember, at one time, being squashed against a barrier to such an extent that I was exerting all my energies to prevent injury ... I dreaded any goals or near misses as this was followed by a surge of people which caused me to be squashed painfully against the barrier. After fighting my way through a crowd I found a more comfortable position. I had been in very large football grounds before and since but had never experienced anything quite like the pressure that was created in this crowd at Hillsborough."

The experience led him to state in 1989 that "I wonder, now, whether the Leppings Lane terraces at Hillsborough is somehow susceptible to retaining the pressure created in crowd build up".

== Education ==
Bettison attended South Grove Comprehensive School before leaving at the age of 16 to join South Yorkshire Police as a cadet. He graduated with a Bachelor of Arts (BA) in philosophy and psychology from the University of Oxford, which was later upgraded to a Master of Arts (MA) – an automatic process which requires no further study or examination – and gained a Master of Business Administration (MBA) in business administration and media studies from Sheffield Hallam University. – the former Sheffield Polytechnic. He is also a graduate of the FBI Executive Programme

== Career ==
Bettison began his police career in 1975 when, at the age of 19, he joined South Yorkshire Police as a Constable. He served through its ranks, acting as a Superintendent in the Traffic Division from October 1989 to January 1991, whilst simultaneously working in the Hillsborough disaster liaison unit; as Superintendent in the Divisional Commander's office from January 1991 to April 1992; and as Chief Superintendent in the Corporate Development unit from April 1992 to May 1993. In May 1993 he was appointed Assistant Chief Constable of West Yorkshire Police, where his portfolios included Management & Information Support, Personnel, and Operations Support.

=== Chief Constable of Merseyside Police ===
He left West Yorkshire in 1998 to become Chief Constable of Merseyside Police, covering the area where most of the Hillsborough victims had lived and still had relatives living. A member of Merseyside Police Authority, Councillor Steve Foulkes, said the appointment had caused outrage among the families of the victims of the 1989 Hillsborough disaster, because Bettison had been involved in the investigation, which had been controversial. Bettison offered to meet the families to defuse the controversy. As Chief Constable of Merseyside he was a pioneer of Neighbourhood Policing: a policing style which provides dedicated teams of police officers and community support officers (CSO) who work with the community and partners at a local level

=== Chief Executive of Centrex ===
He retired from the police in January 2005 to become Chief Executive of Centrex, which provided training and development to police forces in the UK and enforcement agencies throughout the world until it was abolished in March 2007.

=== Chief Constable of West Yorkshire Police ===
He rejoined the police service in January 2007 as Chief Constable of West Yorkshire Police. He attempted to secure a package to receive both a retirement pension from Merseyside and a salary from the new post; he threatened legal action but the claim was settled out of court.

Shortly after taking office as Chief Constable of West Yorkshire Police, Sir Norman ordered a review of shifts worked by officers claiming they did not provide the best service to the public as they included four rest days when officers were not at work. A new shift pattern consisting of two distinct patterns referred to as VSA 1 and VSA 2 (variable shift arrangement) was produced and commenced in March 2008. Response officers worked VSA 1 and neighbourhood policing teams worked VSA 2. The VSA 2 still included four rest days for officers. Officers posted to Communications Division were allowed to continue working the more popular previous shift pattern, FSDR (Force Standard Duty Rosta) as Communications Division had been able to successfully argue that VSA was not fit for purpose for their requirements. The VSA 1 proved deeply unpopular with many officers claiming that they were more tired than they had been working the previous shift pattern. A report leaked from the Police Federation to local media suggested that there had been an increase of 16,000 hours of sickness between April and August 2008, a 3.4% increase on the previous year. After pressure by the police federation a further review was taken and VSA 1 was re-designed and commenced in April 2009. Many officers remain unconvinced as to the need to deviate from the FSDR shift pattern which had allowed West Yorkshire Police to achieve 'very significant performance gains' and be regarded as one of the most improved forces.

=== Media statements ===
In October 2008, Bettison was touted as a possible replacement for Sir Ian Blair as Commissioner of the Metropolitan Police, but ruled himself out of consideration citing the politicisation of the role and the way Blair was removed. He warned of "dangerous consequences" if the independence of chief constables were lost, saying "I am not prepared to set aside my professional judgement and integrity, forged over 36 years, in order to meet short-term political expediency" and warning of "the ambition which seems to be shared by all three major political parties at the moment... to make the police service more accountable to elected representatives. What that means is bringing the police service under greater political control."

On 12 April 2010 Bettison wrote an article in The Times saying "I'm not worth £213,000"; his annual cost to the tax payer when pensions and benefits are considered. He criticized the notion, in the National Health Service and other government bureaus, that public sector organisations had to offer wages for senior managers comparable to those for private industry, or that businesspeople should be brought in to conduct strategic reviews of public agencies. Instead, he wrote, "People join, and remain in, the public sector because of a sense of vocation — to make a difference to society or to the quality of people’s lives. The best leaders are those who can secure long-term public value and a vision for their staff. Not some mercenary performance manager peddling a short-term fix." Thus he suggested freezing public sector pay, without exceptions, beginning with the highest wage earners, which he felt in combination with a 50p in the pound increase in taxes for higher earners and the removal of all tax allowances would sustain public services.

In an article for the Yorkshire Post, Bettison wrote that over-zealous health and safety officials were making the jobs of his front line officers increasingly more demanding, branding them "the health and safety Taliban". He described feeling that he was "pushing the boundaries" by commending a police officer who jumped into a canal to save a suicidal man, due to the officer's personal risk, and that in another case police and ambulance crews failed to save two shooting victims after being delayed 20 minutes, because it is "genuinely easier, in that kind of environment, to do nothing. We are not trained, equipped, practised or informed sufficiently for this or that particular scenario." He also described the conviction of Metropolitan Police for the death of Jean Charles de Menezes as "A triumph for health and safety, a lucrative new territory for lawyers, a disaster for common sense."

== Role in Hillsborough disaster ==
=== Match attendance ===
On 15 April 1989, as an off-duty police Chief Inspector/private citizen Bettison, attended the semi-final FA Cup football match tie between Liverpool and Nottingham Forest at the Hillsborough Stadium, Sheffield. At 15:06 the Hillsborough disaster unfolded, which resulted in 97 Liverpool fans being fatally crushed (although three of them died at later dates), and remains the deadliest stadium-related disaster in British history and one of the world's worst ever football disasters. Bettison subsequently left his seat and joined in the South Yorkshire Police efforts to control the unfolding disaster. He claims to have attended a number of casualties, and set up a rendezvous centre for relatives at a local boys' club.

=== South Yorkshire Police review/liaison ===
After the disaster and in the period leading up to the Taylor Report, Bettison was seconded to an internal review group within South Yorkshire Police team who were tasked with liaising with regards issues associated with Hillsborough. Later described as a "black propaganda" unit, the media output included a 30 minute film narrated by Bettison that was shown to MPs during a visit by SYP to Westminster, which verbally reiterated the claims of drunk, violent and ticketless fans breaking down the dilapidated turnstiles at the Leppings Lane end. During a prior meeting to brief Michael Shersby MP and show him the film, it was also claimed that the South Yorkshire Police had deliberately left the rescue operation to the fans so that the fans "would not take out their frustration on the police".

Bettison has consistently described his role in Hillsborough as 'peripheral', which has been disputed. He has been asked to explain how exactly his role was peripheral, what exactly his role was, who he was answerable to, and what he did for the two-year period.

As a result of his role within the unit, the Hillsborough Families Support Group later led protests on Merseyside when Bettison was proposed as the Chief Constable of Merseyside Police, objections which were over ruled by the police authority.

=== Contribution hearings ===
On 12 July 1990, Bettison prepared and submitted a document for the Hillsborough contribution hearings, the civil court case through which the police sought to recover damages from other parties with liability such as the football club and stadium engineers. In this document, Bettison wrote:

"The fullest information on the closure of the central tunnel at the 1988 Semi-Final ... it was an informal initiative at junior level not reported to command level"

This conclusion was also drawn by the Coroner who directed the inquest jury that the senior officers had not been aware of diversions from the tunnel by police officers in 1988.

Internal documents later released by South Yorkshire Police to the Hillsborough Independent Panel included the minutes of a meeting held on 17 April 1989 with senior members of South Yorkshire Police. It is not clear whether Bettison was in attendance. In the meeting, the then Chief Constable is documented to have stated:

"You were well aware that there were contingencies to deal with the filled stand. i.e the shutting off of the tunnel."

=== Hillsborough Independent Panel report ===
On 12 September 2012 Bettison's role in the Hillsborough disaster was revealed by the Hillsborough Independent Panel report. Families of the victims demanded Bettison's resignation.

In response to the report, Bettison released a statement saying that his role was never to "besmirch" the fans, but said that Liverpool fans' behaviour that day made policing the event "harder than it needed to be." His comments sparked fury, and led to calls for him to resign. The IPCC later criticised Bettison's statement saying that it was "insensitive and inappropriate to make reference to fan behaviour at all, bearing in mind that publication of the report represented a vindication for the fans that their behaviour was not a factor," and that his "unwise" comments "flew in the face of the report's definitive findings".

Trevor Hicks, chair of the families support group, said; "Sir Norman Bettison, currently chief constable of West Yorkshire police and a former chief constable of Merseyside, should quit. As a South Yorkshire chief inspector and later superintendent, he was a member of the internal review group or liaison unit on Hillsborough and, as such, the families say he had a key role in presenting the police in the best light and blaming the fans for the disaster. Labour MP Maria Eagle told parliament: the "liaison unit orchestrated what can only be described as a black propaganda campaign."

Hicks, who lost his two teenage daughters in the disaster, said: "If he is anything of a man, he will stand down and scurry up a drainpipe somewhere."

On 13 September 2012 former Home Secretary Jack Straw said in a radio interview that Bettison was "bound to be considering his position". He added that in his experience Bettison was a fine police officer . Later that same day, Bettison was referred to the West Yorkshire Police Authority, over his role and post-disaster conduct at the Hillsborough disaster. He was quoted as saying "I really welcome the disclosure of all facts that can be known about the Hillsborough tragedy because I have absolutely nothing to hide."

On 14 September, Bettison issued an apology for his statement issued on 13 September "for any upset caused by a statement he issued about his role in the Hillsborough tragedy." Bettison said he had not intended to suggest Liverpool fans had hindered police during the disaster, that Liverpool fans were "in no way to blame", and that he was sorry if he had "caused any further upset".

On 28 June 2017, he was charged with offences related to alleged lies in the aftermath. The case was dropped on 21 August 2018.

== Resignation ==
At the start of October 2012 he announced that he was to retire in March 2013, ending 38 years of service to the police. On 23 October 2012, Bettison resigned with immediate effect as Chief Constable of West Yorkshire Police, after Maria Eagle MP on the floor of the House and thus protected by Parliamentary privilege, accused him of boasting about the Hillsborough cover-up operation involving concocting a story that all the Liverpool fans were drunk and that police were afraid that they were going to break down the gates and so decided to open them. Bettison denied the claim, and more general allegations about his conduct, saying "there is nothing I'm ashamed of". Merseyside Police Authority confirmed that he would receive an £83,000 pension, unless convicted of a criminal offence in relation to Hillsborough. Hillsborough families called for the payments to be frozen during the IPCC investigation.

== Gross misconduct charge ==
Following a Freedom of Information request, the minutes of West Yorkshire Police Authority were released and they revealed that Bettison resigned after learning that "he faced possible dismissal over a last minute discussion with a police authority executive in which he allegedly sought to influence talks about his role in the Hillsborough scandal." This conversation would have justified his sacking if it was proved that he had interfered with the “integrity of the complaints handling process."

Bettison is also to be investigated by the Independent Police Complaints Commission over allegations that he was involved in the theft of a substantial quantity of precious metal on 11 August 1987.

== Alleged misconduct in Stephen Lawrence enquiry ==
On 3 July 2013 Bettison was referred to the IPCC by West Yorkshire Police and Crime Commissioner Mark Burns-Williamson in relation to alleged misconduct during the Macpherson Inquiry into the murder of Stephen Lawrence, a black South London teenager who had been fatally stabbed in a racist attack 20 years earlier. Three documents were found, about which Burns-Williamson said:

"These documents raise significant concerns over the role of Sir Norman Bettison at the time he was Assistant Chief Constable of West Yorkshire Police in 1998 in commissioning a report to be prepared in the respect of a key witness appearing before the Macpherson Inquiry. This may suggest an attempt to intervene in the course of a public inquiry and influence the manner in which the testimony of a witness, who was due to present evidence before it, was received. I have today referred this to the Independent Police Complaints Commission."

== Honours ==
Bettison was made an Honorary Fellow of Liverpool John Moores University in 2004. In the 2000 Birthday Honours, he was awarded the Queen's Police Medal, and was knighted in 2006.

Liverpool John Moores University came under pressure to rescind Bettison's fellowship, following the publication of the report of the Hillsborough Independent Panel. The University responded that the requests were being treated with the 'utmost seriousness' but that it would be 'prejudicial' to IPCC investigation to make a decision before the outcome of that investigation was known. On 9 April 2013, LJMU announced they were withdrawing the honorary fellowship granted to Bettison. He was awarded the Honorary degree of Doctor of the University by the University of Huddersfield in 2012.

Ribbon	Description	Notes
	Knight Bachelor	2006
	Queen's Police Medal (QPM)	2000
	Queen Elizabeth II Golden Jubilee Medal	2002; UK version of this medal
	Queen Elizabeth II Diamond Jubilee Medal	2012; UK version of this medal
	Police Long Service and Good Conduct Medal	
	Rhodesia Medal	1980

Police appointments
Preceded by Sir James Sharples	Chief Constable of Merseyside Police; 1998–2004	Succeeded by Bernard Hogan-Howe
Preceded by Colin Cramphorn	Chief Constable of West Yorkshire Police; 2007–2012	Succeeded by Dee Collins
