= Listed buildings in Rotherham (Wingfield Ward) =

Wingfield is a ward in the Metropolitan Borough of Rotherham, South Yorkshire, England. The ward contains eleven listed buildings that are recorded in the National Heritage List for England. All the listed buildings are designated at Grade II, the lowest of the three grades, which is applied to "buildings of national importance and special interest". The ward is to the north of the centre of Rotherham, and includes the suburb of Greasbrough and the surrounding area. The listed buildings consist of houses, farmhouses, farm buildings, a church, and a war memorial.

== Buildings ==
| Name and location | Photograph | Date | Notes |
|---|---|---|---|
| Barbot Hall Farmhouse; 53.44861°N 1.36243°W | — | 16th or 17th century | A former manor house with a timber framed core, later encased and extended. It is in sandstone with some pebbledashing, and hipped roofs of stone slate and Welsh slate. There are two storeys and a partial cellar, and an H-shaped plan, consisting of a three-bay hall range and cross-wings. The central doorway has chamfered jambs, an arched lintel and a hood mould, and it is flanked by mullioned windows. Elsewhere there are sash windows with wedge lintels. |
| Farm building, Bassingthorpe Farm; 53.44389°N 1.37352°W | — | Early 17th century | A combination farm building with a timber framed core, encased and extended later. The walls are in sandstone with quoins, and the roof is in Welsh slate and asbestos sheeting. There is an L-shaped plan, consisting of a single-story range with 4½ bays, and a three-bay timber-framed building, partly with two storeys. The openings include doorways, windows, some of which are mullioned, and slit vents. |
| Barn and horse-engine house, Manor Farm; 53.45637°N 1.36882°W | — | Early 17th century (probable) | The barn has a timber framed core, it was encased, and the horse engine house was added, in the 18th–19th century. The walls are in sandstone with quoins, and the roof is in stone slate with some Welsh slate. The building is partly in two storeys, there are four bays, and the apsidal horse engine house is on the north side. The openings include doorways, casement windows, loading hatches, and slit vents. |
| 2 and 4 Dam Head, Greasbrough; 53.45998°N 1.37140°W | — | Early 18th century (probable) | A house near Greasbrough Dam, later divided, it is sandstone with quoins and a stone slate roof. There are two storeys, three bays, a separately-roofed extension in the rear left corner, and the angle is infilled by a wing. The central doorway has a bonded surround, to the right is a horizontally-sliding sash window, and the other windows are 20th-century casements. |
| 6 Church Street, Greasbrough, and arches 53.45644°N 1.37028°W | — | Mid 18th century | A sandstone house with chamfered quoins, and a Welsh slate roof with square-cut gable copings and shaped kneelers on the right. There are two storeys and attics, and three bays. The doorway has a quoined surround and a lintel shaped to form chamfered springers and a keystone. Above the doorway is a blind recess, and the windows are casements. To the left are two elliptical carriage arches with monolithic piers, imposts, and keystones, and a coped wall above. |
| Barbot Hall; 53.44666°N 1.36020°W | | c.1815 | A large house in rendered sandstone on a plinth, with bands, a deep eaves projection, and a hipped Welsh slate roof. There are two storeys, attics and cellars, fronts of three and five bays, and a recessed two-bay wing on the left. The central doorway has attached Doric columns, a fanlight and an open pediment, and the windows are sashes. In the right return is a two-storey canted bay window. |
| Glossop Lodge; 53.45430°N 1.35771°W | | 1825 | The lodge is in sandstone, with a frieze above the windows, oversailing eaves, and a hexagonal Welsh slate roof. There is a single-storey, a hexagonal plan and three pedimented wings, and a later extension. The entry is at the rear, and at the front is a dummy doorway. The windows are sashes, some are blind, and all have recessed aprons and plain lintels. |
| 1 Greenside, Greasbrough; 53.45301°N 1.36902°W | — | Early 19th century | A sandstone house that has a Welsh slate roof with square-cut gable copings and shaped kneelers. There are two storeys and an attic, three bays, and a single-storey rear wing on the right. The central doorway has a fanlight and a moulded cornice, and the windows are sashes with wedge lintels. In the angle at the rear is a porch with re-used masonry and a re-sited door. |
| St Mary's Church; 53.45622°N 1.37176°W | | 1826–28 | The church is built in sandstone and has a tile roof. It consists of a nave and a chancel in one unit, with a schoolroom under the chancel, and a tower at the north end flanked by porches. The tower has diagonal buttresses that rise to crocketed pinnacles, a double doorway, a two-light window, clock faces, two-light bell openings, and a crested balustrade with ogee-headed openings. Along the sides of the church are embattled parapets. |
| 33–39 Coach Road, Greasbrough; 53.45384°N 1.37132°W | — | c.1828 | A row of four sandstone houses on a plinth, with a chamfered eaves band, and roof a Welsh slate with some stone slate and moulded gable copings. There is a single storey and four bays. In the centre is a protruding flat-roofed porch with Tudor arched entrances and hood moulds on the front and sides. In each bay is a window with a quoined surround, a pointed arch, and a hood mould. The returns contain doorways with chamfered quoined surrounds and hood moulds and casement windows, and in the right return is a blind oculus. |
| Greasbrough War Memorial and enclosure 53.45665°N 1.37349°W | | 1925 | The war memorial is in an enclosure surrounded by railings at a road junction. It is in limestone, and consists of a cenotaph in the form of a triumphal arch with carved swags above it. There is a plinth, above which are plaques with inscriptions and the names of those lost in the two World Wars. Within the arch is a bronze lamp with an eternal flame under a lintel, and the cenotaph is flanked by cast iron urns. The enclosure has railings and gates in wrought iron, and lamp standards in cast iron. |
