= Nazir Ahmed, Baron Ahmed =

British politician (born 1957)

The Right Honourable The Lord Ahmed
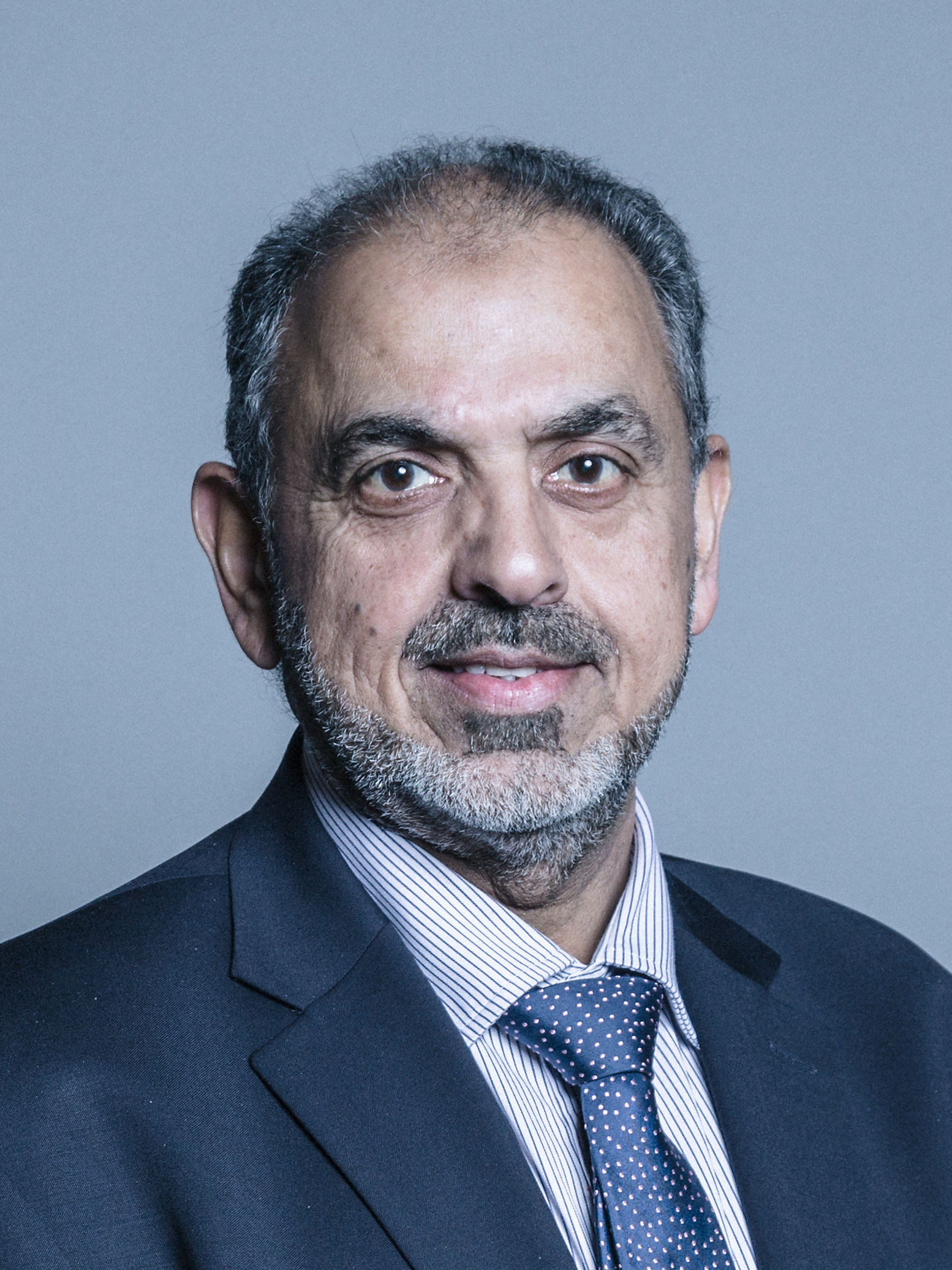
- Official portrait, 2018

Member of the House of Lords
- Lord Temporal
- Life peerage 3 August 1998 – 14 November 2020

Personal details
- Born: Nazir Ahmed; 24 April 1957 (age 69) Mirpur, Azad Kashmir, Pakistan
- Party: Non-affiliated (2013–2020)
- Other political affiliations: Labour (until 2013)
- Spouse: Sakina Bibi
- Children: 3
- Education: Sheffield Polytechnic
- Occupation: Property development and management

Nazir Ahmed, Baron Ahmed (Urdu: نذیر احمد; born 24 April 1957), is a British former politician. As a member of the Labour Party, he was appointed a life peer in 1998.

Ahmed faced expulsion from the House of Lords in 2020 on account of sexually exploiting a woman who had approached him in 2017 in his capacity as a member of the House, and resigned from the House after a recommendation of its Conduct Committee that he be expelled, but before it was implemented. However, he continues to be a life peer, although not a member of the House.

On 5 January 2022 he was found guilty of historical sex offences, committed when he was a teenager, being the attempted rape of a child under 13 years of age and sexual assault of another.

He was sentenced to five years and six months in prison, reduced on appeal to two years and six months.

== Early life ==
Ahmed was born to Muslim parents immigrated in the Partition of India to the town of Mirpur, Pakistan administered Kashmir on 24 April 1957 to Haji Sain Mohammed and Rashim Bibi. His parents migrated to the United Kingdom when he was 2 and he has lived in Rotherham, South Yorkshire, since 1959. He attended Spurley Hey Comprehensive School, then Thomas Rotherham Sixth Form College. He studied for a degree in public administration at Sheffield Polytechnic and joined the Labour Party when he was 18 years old.

== Politics ==
In 1990 Ahmed began his political career as a local Labour Party councillor, becoming the chair of the South Yorkshire Labour Party in 1993 and holding both positions until 2000. He founded the British Muslim Councillors' Forum and was a magistrate between 1992 and 2000. He was the first Asian councillor in Rotherham and the town's youngest magistrate. He enjoyed backing from the Pakistan government, and was known for lobbying in the British Parliament on the Kashmir issue on Pakistan's behalf. This advocacy included holding anti-India protests outside the Indian Embassy in London. He claims to have changed the policies of the Labour Party to the extent that, for the first time in British history, Kashmir was discussed on the floor of the conference. He is associated with the Justice Foundation, which organised that conference and whose director at that time was Syed Ghulam Nabi Fai – a Pakistani Kashmir lobbyist arrested by the USA for spying and illegal lobbying, and according to US prosecutors the Justice Foundation's Kashmir Centres in UK, USA and Saudi Arabia are run on behalf of the Pakistani government and its military intelligence Inter-Services Intelligence Agency.

Ahmed was created a life peer, Baron Ahmed, of Rotherham in the County of South Yorkshire, on 3 August 1998. Although there have been many claims that he was the first Muslim life peer, including by Ahmed himself, or the first male Muslim peer, he was in fact the third Muslim life peer; the other two, Baroness Uddin and Lord Alli, were raised to the Peerage on 18 July whereas Lord Ahmed was so raised on 3 August. There have been earlier Muslim hereditary peers, the first being the 3rd Baron Stanley of Alderley in 1869.

He led the first delegation on behalf of the British Government on the Muslim pilgrimage of the Hajj. At home, he spoke on wider equality issues, and spoke several times on issues of race, religion and gender; he advocated legislation against religious discrimination and forced marriage.

In August 2006 he was a signatory to an open letter to prime minister Tony Blair criticising the UK's foreign policy.

On 19 June 2007 Ahmed criticised the honouring of Salman Rushdie with a knighthood because of what he saw as Rushdie's offensiveness to Islam. He was reported to have said, "It's hypocrisy by Tony Blair, who two weeks ago was talking about building bridges to mainstream Muslims, and then he's honouring a man who has insulted the British public and been divisive in community relations." "This man not only provoked violence around the world because of his writings, but there were many people who were killed around the world. Forgiving and forgetting is one thing, but honouring the man who has blood on his hands, sort of, because of what he did, I think is going a bit too far." He also said on BBC Radio 4's PM programme that he had been appalled by the award to a man he accused of having 'blood on his hands'.

In September 2007, Ahmed flew to Islamabad with Pakistan's former prime minister Nawaz Sharif, in a bid to end Sharif's exile from the country by military ruler Pervez Musharraf, who had ousted him in a coup d'état. He negotiated with police to allow Sharif to enter the airport terminal and pass through customs, but Sharif was arrested later, and deported.

After the reform of the House of Lords, Ahmed took over from Lord Sudeley to act as Host for the Forum for Stable Currencies.

In November 2007 Ahmed was involved in a diplomatic effort to secure the release of Gillian Gibbons from custody in Sudan. The teacher, Gillian Gibbons, allowed her class to name a teddy bear Muhammad. Ahmed, from Britain's ruling Labour Party, and Baroness Warsi, an opposition Conservative, visited Khartoum and had a meeting with the President of Sudan. Miss Gibbons, who had been given a fifteen-day prison sentence, was released after eight days following a Presidential pardon and allowed to return to the UK.

In June 2008, the political editor of Newsnight, Michael Crick, reported that Ahmed had been rumoured to be preparing to defect to the Conservative Party, but that he had denied this.

On 13 May 2013, two days before he was scheduled to appear before the Labour National Executive Committee in relation to antisemitic remarks he allegedly made in an interview on television in Pakistan, Ahmed resigned from the Labour party, saying that he could not expect a fair hearing.

== Activities ==
Ahmed has operated as a property developer concurrent with his political career. He was a supporter of Fauji Foundation and the affairs of the Pakistan Army throughout. Ahmed has exploited various charitable causes and has been on the board of several organisations, including a period as president of South Yorkshire Victim Support and as a trustee of the British Heart Foundation. He resigned from his position as a trustee of the Joseph Interfaith Foundation in March 2013 as a result of the allegations of antisemitism.

== Controversies ==
In December 2001, Ahmed claimed that his phone had been tapped by the government because of his opposition to its intervention in Afghanistan. He claimed he had a heated conversation with Foreign Office minister Denis MacShane, during which MacShane claimed to have transcripts of Ahmed's private conversations. The government denied that Ahmed was under surveillance, and MacShane said that his remarks had been misinterpreted.

In 2002, Ahmed was accused by campaign group Baby Milk Action of changing his position on Nestlé's sale of baby milk in Pakistan at a time when he was negotiating a paid advisory role with the company: he subsequently became a consultant.

On 25 July 2005, Ahmed, while interviewing with Robert Siegel on National Public Radio, said that the suicide bombers of 7/7 had an "identity crisis" and that "unfortunately, our imams and mosques have not been able to communicate the true message of Islam in the language that these young people can understand." Christopher Orlet of The American Spectator did not agree with Ahmed's "identity crisis". He said, "That's not an identity crisis, Lord Ahmed, that's religious psychopathy. That's a bloodthirstiness that makes Dracula look like a teetotaler." Ahmed did acknowledge, "the community leaders and religious leaders, who have kept very close contacts with South Asia and the Middle East rather than keeping a good contact with the British society where we live."

On 30 November 2006, the New Statesman reported a claim by fellow Muslim and Labour parliamentarian Shahid Malik that Ahmed had campaigned against him during the Dewsbury election in 2005. He alleged that Ahmed instead backed Sayeeda Warsi, vice-chair of the Conservative Party, the daughter of a personal friend. According to the New Statesman's report, Warsi "welcomed Lord Ahmed's support". The New Statesman also printed Ahmed's denial, saying "I never told any constituent of Dewsbury to vote for the Tories".

On 3 February 2009, Melanie Phillips, a newspaper columnist, claimed that Ahmed had threatened to mobilise 10,000 Muslims to prevent anti-Islamist Dutch MP Geert Wilders from entering the House of Lords to speak at a screening of the film Fitna. Wilders had been invited by a peer to debate issues of social inclusion. This claim was later denied by Ahmed, but the House of Lords authorities had determined to provide adequate security, if necessary. In the event, the film Fitna was broadcast as planned, but Wilders was denied entry to the UK, thus leading many commentators to deplore the action by the Home Secretary Jacqui Smith as appeasement.

=== Imprisonment for dangerous driving ===
On 25 December 2007, Ahmed was involved in a crash on the M1 motorway near Rotherham in which Martin Gombar, 28, was killed. Gombar's car had been involved in a crash and he had left it in the outer lane. Apparently trying to return to his vehicle from the hard shoulder he was hit by Ahmed, who was driving his Jaguar X-Type. Ahmed's wife and mother, who were passengers in the car, also received minor injuries.

On 1 December 2008, Ahmed appeared at Sheffield Magistrates' Court on a charge of dangerous driving. Ahmed admitted sending and receiving five text messages on his phone while driving two minutes before the crash, and pleaded guilty. He was banned from driving until his sentencing. On 22 December, Sheffield Magistrates' Court referred the case for sentencing at Sheffield Crown Court on 19 January due to its "aggravating features". This was later put back until 25 February. Ahmed was sentenced to 12 weeks in prison, which meant he would serve six weeks in jail, and he was disqualified from driving for 12 months.

On 12 March 2009 Ahmed's sentence was varied by the Court of Appeal. Lady Justice Hallett said it was important to state that Ahmed's offence was one of dangerous driving, not of causing death by dangerous driving. Hallett said that there was "little or nothing" Ahmed could have done to avoid the collision and that after being knocked unconscious, he had come to and "risked his life trying to flag down other vehicles to stop them colliding with the Audi or his car". She said that while his prison sentence had been justified, the court had been persuaded it could now take an "exceptional" course and suspend the sentence for 12 months. He was released (subject to the suspended sentence) 16 days into his original sentence.

In subsequent interviews, Ahmed incorrectly stated that he had no criminal record and that his sentence was overturned.

=== Bounty allegation ===
A Pakistani newspaper, The Express Tribune, erroneously alleged that Ahmed said "If the US can announce a reward of $10 million for the captor of Hafiz Saeed, I can announce a bounty of £10 million on President Obama and his predecessor George Bush", at a business meeting in Haripur, Pakistan, on 15 April 2012. On learning of these allegations, the Labour Party immediately suspended Ahmed pending a formal investigation. He later responded by stating "I'm shocked and horrified that this whole story could be just made up of lies...." Ahmed went on to say that he was not issuing a bounty but rather calls for the prosecution of George W. Bush and Tony Blair due to the "war crimes committed in Iraq and Afghanistan" in what he considers to be "illegal wars".

Video footage of the meeting, released on 18 April, showed that Ahmed had been misquoted and instead had said, "Even if I have to beg I am willing to raise and offer £10 million so that George W Bush and Tony Blair can be brought to the International Court of Justice on war crimes charges." The same day, The Express Tribune offered a "clarification" that it had "erroneously reported" Ahmed's statement and that their reporter had incorrectly cited the name of Obama. The article stated that the newspaper "deeply regretted" its mistake. His suspension was revoked on 25 June 2012.

=== Malala accusation ===
In November 2012 Ahmed claimed that the attempted assassination of Malala Yousafzai by the Pakistani Taliban (not the main Afghan Taliban), might have been carried out by unnamed official elements in Pakistan as part of an effort to discredit the Pakistani Taliban. He subsequently accepted that he gave the speech whilst having "no idea what happened" and that this was not the case.

=== Controversial remarks following driving conviction ===
On 14 March 2013, The Times reported that Nazir Ahmed had claimed in a 2012 interview with a Pakistani television channel that he was jailed for 12 weeks for sending and receiving text messages while driving due to pressure from Jewish-owned media. He alleged that his case became more critical because of his support for Palestinians, stating, “My Jewish friends who own newspapers and TV channels opposed [speaking out in favor of Palestine].” Ahmed also suggested that the judge in his case was specifically selected due to connections with a Jewish colleague of former Prime Minister Tony Blair.

Ahmed's remarks drew widespread criticism. The Labour Party suspended him, stating it “deplores and does not tolerate any sort of racism or antisemitism.” Jewish organizations, including the Board of Deputies of British Jews, condemned his comments, describing them as perpetuating harmful conspiracy theories. Ahmed initially denied recalling the remarks but later apologized, describing his comments as “completely unacceptable” and the product of a “twisted mind.”

=== Allegations of sexual impropriety ===
In February 2019, Ahmed was accused of using his position in the House of Lords to have sex with vulnerable women. One of the women, Tahira Zaman, explained how the pair went on to have an intimate sexual relationship after she had approached Ahmed for help with a personal matter in February 2017. A second woman, who wanted to remain anonymous, also alleged that when she asked Ahmed for help he suggested she should spend the night at his London home which she refused as she interpreted this as a proposition for sex. Ahmed denied acting inappropriately. House of Lords Commissioner for Standards, Lucy Scott-Moncrieff, found Tahira Zaman's accusations credible and substantial, but no further action was then taken against Ahmed as his actions did not relate to his parliamentary duties.

== Convictions of attempted rape and sexual assault ==
On 1 March 2019, Ahmed was charged with two offences of attempted rape and one offence of indecent assault between 1971 and 1974. The alleged victims were at the time a boy and a girl, both under the age of 13. The incidents reportedly took place between 1971 and 1974 while Ahmed was a teenager aged between 14 and 17 living in Rotherham.

He appeared at Sheffield Magistrates' Court with co-accused two brothers also facing charges on 19 March 2019; they were all granted bail to appear at Sheffield Crown Court on 16 April. On that date, his trial was fixed for 2 December 2019 and he was released on bail. His elder brother, Mohammed Farouq, was charged with four counts of indecent assault against a boy under the age of eight. Another elder brother, Mohammed Tariq, was charged with two counts of indecent assault against a boy under 11. Ahmed stood trial in February 2021 after his initial trial dates in 2020 were delayed due to the COVID-19 pandemic. He denied the allegations. His brothers were judged unfit to stand trial by the judge and instead faced a trial of the facts. On 22 February, the jury in the trial were discharged for legal reasons. Ahmed stood trial again in November 2021 when he continued to deny the allegations against him. On 5 January 2022 he was found guilty of attempted rape of a girl and of a serious sexual assault upon a boy. On 4 February 2022, Mr Justice Lavender sentenced Ahmed to five years and six months in prison.

An appeal against the sentence was lodged and in March 2023 the Court of Appeal ruled that the three-and-a-half-year sentence imposed for the charge of buggery was excessive as he was still a child himself when the offence was committed and that the trial judge should have taken this into account when sentencing Ahmed. The sentences of two years for the attempted rapes offences were unchanged, resulting in the total sentence being reduced from five and a half years to two and a half years.

An appeal against the conviction was heard in July 2023 and was dismissed by the Court of Appeal.

Ahmed's male victim, and the Muslim Women's Network UK, called for him to lose his title over his conviction. Under the House of Lords rules, a member convicted of a serious criminal offence resulting in a jail sentence of at least one year can be expelled from the House; though an expelled peer still retains their title, which can only be removed by an act of parliament.

== Departure from House of Lords ==
The Conduct Committee of the House of Lords considered in 2020 a complaint from a member of the public who had approached Lord Ahmed in 2017 in his capacity as a member of the House. Her complaint was that he "initially made unwanted physical contact of a sexual nature with her and later held out the promise of using his influence to help her, when in fact his aim was to have sex with her". The Commissioner concluded that on the balance of probabilities Lord Ahmed's actions put him "in breach of the Code by failing to act on his personal honour". The Committee on 17 November 2020 published its report, recommending that "Lord Ahmed be expelled from the House under Standing Order 12". It was the first time that expulsion of a peer from the House of Lords had been recommended.

After seeing the report, and before any action was taken, Lord Ahmed resigned from the House of Lords. He continues to hold the title of a life peer.

In 2024, while imprisoned, Ahmed appealed to the European Court of Human Rights, seeking to have the Parliamentary report overturned on the basis that the Lords investigation had breached his right to privacy and had "devastating consequences for his private and family life." The court rejected Ahmed's appeal.

== Family life ==
Ahmed married Sakina Bibi in 1974. They have a daughter and two sons. As of 2008, he lived in Rotherham.

Orders of precedence in the United Kingdom
Preceded by The Lord Norton of Louth	Gentlemen; Baron Ahmed	Followed by The Lord Bragg
