= Virtual Reality (journal) =

Scientific journal on virtual reality

- Discipline: Computer science
- Language: English
- Edited by: Daniel Ballin, Robert D. Macredie

Publication details
- History: 1995–present
- Publisher: Springer Science+Business Media
- Frequency: Continuous
- Open access: Yes
- License: CC BY
- Impact factor: 5.4 (2025)

Standard abbreviations
- ISO 4: Virtual Real.

Indexing
- ISSN: 1359-4338 (print); 1434-9957 (web)
- LCCN: 2004255103
- OCLC no.: 265417354

Links
- Journal homepage; Online archive

Virtual Reality is a peer-reviewed open access scientific journal published by Springer Science+Business Media covering research on virtual reality, augmented reality, and mixed reality applications. The editors-in-chief are Daniel Ballin (Ideas Crucible) and Robert D. Macredie (Brunel University London). The founding editors were Rae E. Earnshaw (University of Bradford and Glyndwr University) and John A. Vince (Bournemouth University) who established the journal in 1995.

== Abstracting and indexing ==
The journal is abstracted and indexed in:

- Current Contents/Engineering, Computing & Technology
- EBSCO databases
- Ei Compendex
- Inspec
- ProQuest databases
- Science Citation Index Expanded
- Scopus

According to the Journal Citation Reports, the journal has a 2025 impact factor of 5.4.
