= Listed buildings in Wickersley =

Wickersley, is a civil parish in the Metropolitan Borough of Rotherham, South Yorkshire, England. The parish contains nine listed buildings that are recorded in the National Heritage List for England. All the listed buildings are designated at Grade II, the lowest of the three grades, which is applied to "buildings of national importance and special interest". The parish contains the village of Wickersley and the surrounding area. The listed buildings consist of houses and associated structures, farm buildings, a church, and items in the churchyard.

== Buildings ==
Name and location	Photograph	Date	Notes
St Alban's Church; 53.41968°N 1.28169°W		15th century	The oldest part of the church is the tower, with the nave dating from 1832 to 1836, and the chancel from 1886. It is built in sandstone with a Welsh slate roof, and consists of a nave, a chancel with a north organ chamber, and a west tower with a vestry in the angle. The tower is in Perpendicular style, with four stages, diagonal buttresses, a south doorway with a pointed arch, a three-light west window, string courses, corner gargoyles, and an embattled parapet with eight crocketed pinnacles.
Remains of medieval coffin 53.41959°N 1.28178°W	—	15th century (probable)	The remains of the coffin are to the south of St Alban's Church. They are in magnesian limestone, and consist of a tapered coffin hollowed out for the corpse and the head.
Pair of gravestones 53.41956°N 1.28159°W	—	c. 1714	The pair of gravestones is in the churchyard of St Alban's Church, and to the memory of members of the Bower family. The gravestones are in red sandstone, and consist of a raised rectangular slab with an additional slab at its foot. On them are inscriptions and ornamental carvings.
Gazebo, Wickersley Grange; 53.41856°N 1.27985°W	—	Early 18th century	The gazebo is in sandstone, with quoins, an eaves cornice, and a hipped stone slate roof. There is a single storey and a single cell. The gazebo contains a doorway with a quoined surround and a lintel with an inscribed shield containing initials and an illegible date, and casement windows.
Wickersley Old Hall; 53.41873°N 1.27936°W	—	Early 18th century	The house, which was later extended, is in sandstone, with quoins, a floor band, a parapet with moulded copings rising as a gable over the middle two bays containing a blind oculus with an architrave, and a two-span Welsh slate roof. In the centre is a French window with a rusticated surround, and there are transomed casement windows to the left, and a two-storey bay window to the right. In the left return is a tall stair window and a mullioned window, and the right return contains a two-storey porch, and a doorway with a chamfered quoined surround.
Barn, Wickersley Grange Farm; 53.41859°N 1.28181°W	—	1773	The barn is in sandstone, and has a Welsh slate roof with coped gables and shaped kneelers. There are two storeys and five bays. The barn contains segmental-arched wagon entries with quoined surrounds and keystones, the one on the front dated, and that at the rear initialled. There are also casement windows, slit vents, and a hatch, and in the gable end is a blind oculus.
35 and 37 Morthen Road; 53.41919°N 1.27979°W		Late 18th century	A pair of cottages that were refronted in the early 19th century, and part was at one time used as a chapel. They are in sandstone with a coped parapet and a Welsh slate roof. There are two storeys, two bays, each with a bowed front, and a recessed later wing on the right as an extension to the rear range. On the front are 20th-century casement windows with curved lintels, those in the left cottage with inscriptions. In the wing is a bow window, and at the rear are coped gables.
Barn, Moat Farm; 53.40845°N 1.26932°W	—	Late 18th century	The farm building consists of a barn and stable with a granary above. They are in sandstone with quoins, stone slate eaves courses, and a pantile roof with a coped gable and shaped kneelers on the right. There are two storeys and a partial attic, and an L-shaped plan, with a range of five bays and one bay in the right return. On the barn are external steps, and the openings include a quoined doorway, casement and mullioned windows, slit vents under segmental arches, and an attic window with a ledge and pigeon holes.
Wickersley Hall; 53.42082°N 1.27983°W	—	Early 19th century	A sandstone house on a plinth, with quoins, and an eaves projection to a hipped tile roof. There are two storeys, three bays, and a recessed bay on the left. The windows on the front are sashes, the middle window in the ground floor with a quoined surround and a double keystone. Under the upper floor windows is an inscription. The left return contains a porch with Ionic columns, a pulvinated frieze, a modillion cornice, and a doorway with a fanlight.
