= Broom Hall =

Building in Sheffield, England

Coordinates: 53.3748°N 1.4884°W

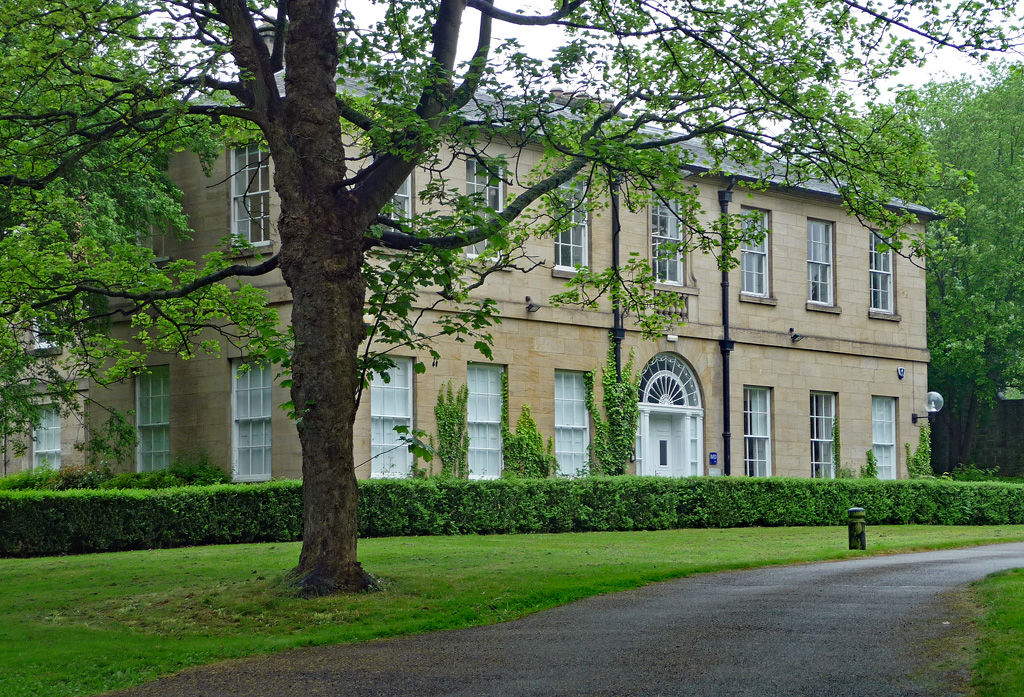
Broom Hall

Broom Hall is a historic house in the City of Sheffield, England that gives its name to the surrounding Broomhall district of the city.

== History ==
The earliest part of the house is timber-framed; it has been tree-ring dated to c1498, and was built by the de Wickersley family, whose ancestral home was at Wickersley. The de Wickersley family descended from Richard FitzTurgis, who co-founded Roche Abbey in South Yorkshire. The de Wickersley family later dropped their Norman name (FitzTurgis) in favour of the village they controlled.

The home later fell to the Swyft (Swift) family, after Robert Swift of Broomhall married Ellen, daughter and heir of Nicholas Wickersley, son and principal heir of John Wickersley of Wickersley and Broomhall.

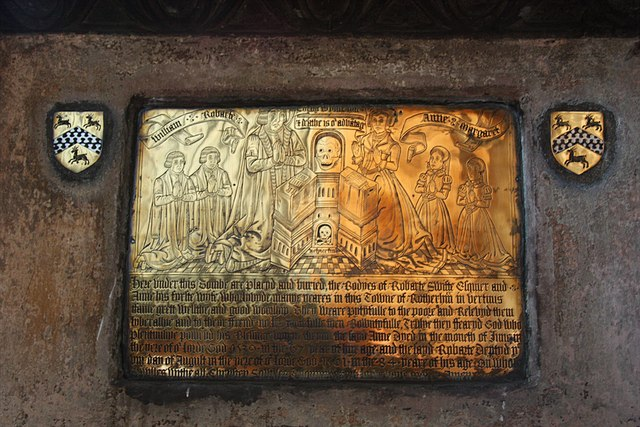
Memorial brass of the Swift family, All Saints Church, Rotherham, later owners of Broom Hall

In the 16th century Broom Hall came into the possession of the Jessop family after marriage to a Swyft heiress. The Jessops added an extension to the house c.1614 and rebuilt sections of the house later in the 17th century. An east wing was added in 1784 for the then owner reverend James Wilkinson, vicar of Sheffield. In 1791, while James Wilkinson was still the owner, a mob rioting against the Enclosure of land act attacked the house and set it on fire. The house was divided into three in the 19th century but was restored as the home and workshop of the cutlery designer David Mellor from 1973 to 1990. It was further restored in 1988 and has since been converted for use as offices. It is a Grade II* listed building.

== See also ==
- Listed buildings in Sheffield
