= Rotherham Real Ale and Music Festival =

Festival in England

The Rotherham Real Ale and Music Festival (formerly the Oakwood Real Ale and Music Festival) is an annual real ale festival that takes place in Rotherham, South Yorkshire.

The event takes place annually at the Magna Centre, Rotherham a former Steel works, it is the largest indoor beer festival taking place outside London and unlike many other festivals serves all cask ales using traditional gravity-based hand pumps.

Proceeds from the festival are used to support the work of local charities and good causes. Since the festival relocated to Magna in 2011 it has raised in excess of £150,000 for local good causes. Charities which have benefitted from the festival have included: The Rotherham Hospice, Weston Park Cancer Hospital, Bluebell Wood Children's Hospice and Safe@Last as well as a number of smaller Rotherham-based good causes.

Unlike many other beer festivals, the Rotherham Real Ale and Music Festival is not organised by CAMRA, although the festival does enjoy close links with the Rotherham branch of the organisation.

Inside the festival, the Rotherham Real Ale and Music Festival regularly features a selection of over 250 different varieties of Real Ale as well as 80 different types of Cider, Wine, Perry (Pear Cider) and Lager.

In 2011, the first festival hosted at the Magna Centre, was attended by 10,000 visitors, raised £35,000 for local good causes. 85,000 glasses of beer were sold at the festival in 2011, which were sold in half pint measures making the Rotherham festival one of the largest festivals in the UK based upon the volume of beer consumed.

In 2013 the festival was opened by local World Superbike Champion James Toseland. Toseland featured in the following year's festival, making a surprise guest when he performed with his band Toseland.

The festival is typically opened by local dignitaries which have included Rt Hon John Healey MP former minister for pubs as well as the mayor of Rotherham.

== History ==
The Oakwood Real Ale and Music Festival began in 1992, initially as a one-off fundraiser to celebrate the 40th Anniversary of the opening of Oakwood High School. Such was the success of the festival, that the event was repeated every year, helping to raise money for the school.

The early days of the festival saw just 20 different real ales feature at the event, with many teachers and parents working behind the bars to help make the event a success. The last event to take place at Oakwood School took place in 2010 featured 220 different real ales, ciders, perries, lagers and wines.

The festival is well known for its quirky themes, which has been used to introduce different types of Real Ales into the festival. Year-on-year the selection of Real Ales has grown from the original 20, to over 250 in 2013.

== Move to Magna ==
In 2011, largely due to growing visitor numbers and popularity of the event, the festival relocated from Oakwood School to the Magna Centre, as well as providing space for the event to continue to grow in size. Between 1992 and 2010 all proceeds for the event were donated to supporting the work of the school. Since 2010, proceeds from the event are used to support charitable causes.

Following the move to Magna, the festival has continued this charitable ethos, supporting a selection of charities within Rotherham and South Yorkshire, with attendances growing from 10,000 to over 12,000 between 2011 and 2014.

== Baa'sil the Sheep ==
Baa'sil the Sheep, who is featured in the festival logo is the official festival mascot. He first appeared at the festival in 2004, which chose Real Ales from "Sheep Counties" around the UK.

Baa'sil provides tasting notes about the different types of Real Ales that feature in the festival and has appeared every subsequent festival. In addition to providing tasting notes, jokes and trivia attributed to Baa'sil appear in around the festival.

== Champion beers ==
Real Ales from Yorkshire that feature in the festival are eligible to enter the festival's Champion Beer competition, which is open to beers brewed for at least six months of the year by breweries based in Yorkshire. Organised by the Rotherham Branch of CAMRA The prize is highly sought after by brewers in the region. The contest is carried out entirely through blind tasting of eligible beers.

== Theme of the festival ==
Each year, the festival selects a theme which ensures that visitors to the event are able to enjoy a selection of Real Ales from around the UK. Previous themes for the festival are:

- 2023 - Baa t'at (Yorkshire themed festival)
- 2022 - Festival for heroes
- 2020 - Lambusters
- 2019 - Baas, Bands and Beers
- 2017 - Mines a Pint!
- 2015 - Baa-Watch
- 2014 - Ale to the Festival
- 2013 - Baa'sil Goes West
- 2012 - Baa's of Steel
- 2011 - The White Rose Festival
- 2010 - Great Northern Festival
- 2009 - A Day at the Races
- 2008 - The Legendary Festival
- 2007 - The Yorkshire Championship
- 2006 - The Festival of Heroes
- 2005 - Back to the Baa
- 2004 - The Great Baa
- 2003 - London to Yorkshire
- 2002 - The Yorkshire Championship
- 2001 - Barr of Soaps
- 2000 - Yorkshire Greater Ales
- 1999 - The Magnificent Seventh
- 1998 - Sporty Sixth
- 1997 - Fabulous Fifth
- 1996 - Fantastic Fourth
- 1995 - Third Smashing Year! (First year the festival is referred to as the Rotherham Real Ale and Music Festival)
- 1994 - The 2nd Real Ale Festival
- 1993 - Unthemed
- 1992 - 40th Anniversary of Oakwood School
