= Greasbrough War Memorial =

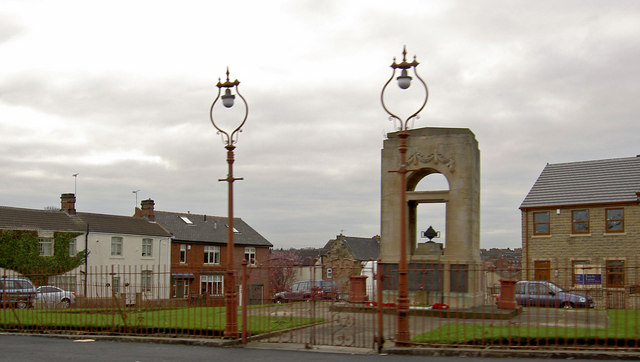
- Greasbrough War Memorial

- Location in South Yorkshire
- 53°27′24″N 1°22′25″W
- Location: Greasbrough, South Yorkshire, England

Listed Building – Grade II
- Official name: War Memorial
- Designated: 19 February 1986
- Reference no.: 1132741

Greasbrough War Memorial is a 20th-century grade II listed war memorial in Greasbrough , South Yorkshire, England.

== History ==
The war memorial, which was unveiled in 1925, is a cenotaph in the form of a triumphal arch with carved swags above it.

The memorial and surrounding railings have been Grade II listed since 19 February 1986.

== See also ==
- Listed buildings in Rotherham (Wingfield Ward)
