= Clifton Community School =

Location
- Middle Lane; Rotherham, South Yorkshire, S65 2SN; England; 53.4324°N 1.3389°W

Information
- Type: Academy
- Motto: We aim to send all young people into an ever-changing world able and qualified to play their full part in it.
- Established: 1973
- Local authority: Rotherham Metropolitan Borough Council
- Department for Education URN: 143545 Tables
- Ofsted: Reports
- Chair of Governors: Anna Lidster
- Head teacher: Marie Smith
- Gender: mixed
- Age: 11 to 16
- Enrolment: 1,009
- Capacity: 1,250
- Colour: Red
- Former names: Clifton Comprehensive School (1973–2004); Clifton: A Community Arts School (2004–2013)
- Website: https://www.cliftonschool.org/

Clifton Community School is a secondary school located in Rotherham, South Yorkshire, England. It is situated on Middle Lane and receives children from a number of primary schools throughout Rotherham.

Clifton is a secondary school serving school years from 7 - 11, with number of pupils on the school roll at 1,009. It is mixed gender and serves pupils aged between 11 – 16. In January 2014 Clifton Community School entered into a partnership with Wickersley School and Sports College.

== History ==
Clifton first started at Rotherham Girls' High School which was a grammar school. Rotherham Girls' Grammar School was established and was dominated by Rotherham Corporation in 1906. Rotherham Girls' High School was moved to Middle Lane, Rotherham. After being taken over by Rotherham Corporation in 1906, 67 Years later it closed down in 1973, with Mrs Ridge still being Headmistress at that time. In September 1973, Rotherham Girls' Grammar School changed to a comprehensive school and was opened as Clifton Comprehensive School in the same building. Mrs Ridge was the first Headmistress of the new Clifton Comprehensive School.

In 1991 Clifton Comprehensive School was divided into the Lower School and Upper School, at separate locations, while incorporating the former Spurley Hey school.

In September 2004 Clifton Comprehensive School was specialized into an "Arts College" and was renamed to "Clifton: A Community Arts School".

In January 2014 "Clifton: A Community Arts School", changed its name to "Clifton Community School". This is the now the present name of the school, linking also with the new January 2014 logo as the school's official new logo.

Clifton became an academy, sponsored by Wickersley Partnership Trust, on 1 December 2017.

== Ofsted inspections ==
Since the commencement of Ofsted inspections in September 1993, the school has undergone seven inspections:

| Date of inspection | Outcome | Reference |
|---|---|---|
| 15–19 May 1995 | ??? | |
| 26–30 April 1999 | Good | Report |
| 24–27 January 2005 | Good | Report |
| 9–10 January 2008 | Satisfactory | Report |
| 29–30 November 2010 | Satisfactory | Report |
| 18–19 September 2012 | Requires improvement | Report |
| 9–10 September 2014 | Inadequate (special measures) | Report |
| 4–5 December 2019 | Good | Report |

== Headteachers ==
- 1973 – 1974: Mrs Ridge (continuing on from Rotherham Girls' High School to Clifton Comprehensive School)
- 1974 - 1982: Mr Bates
- 1983 – 1989: Mr Deeley
- 1989 – 1995: Mr Light
- 1995 – 2005: Mr Marshall
- 2005 – 2014: Mr Daley
- 2014 – 2021: Mr Hardcastle
- 2021 –2025: Mrs Leng
- 2025 - Present: Mrs Smith

== Feeder schools ==
The school receives a notable number of students from Herringthorpe Junior School, Badsley Moor Junior School, Saint Ann's Junior School, East Dene Primary School and a number of other schools around the central Rotherham area.

== Progression to further education ==
As Clifton does not have its own sixth form, the majority of Clifton students embark on their post-16 education at the neighbouring Thomas Rotherham College for academic courses or Rotherham College of Arts and Technology.
