= Clifton, Rotherham =

Suburb of Rotherham, South Yorkshire, England

Coordinates: 53.427739°N 1.3457590°W

Clifton
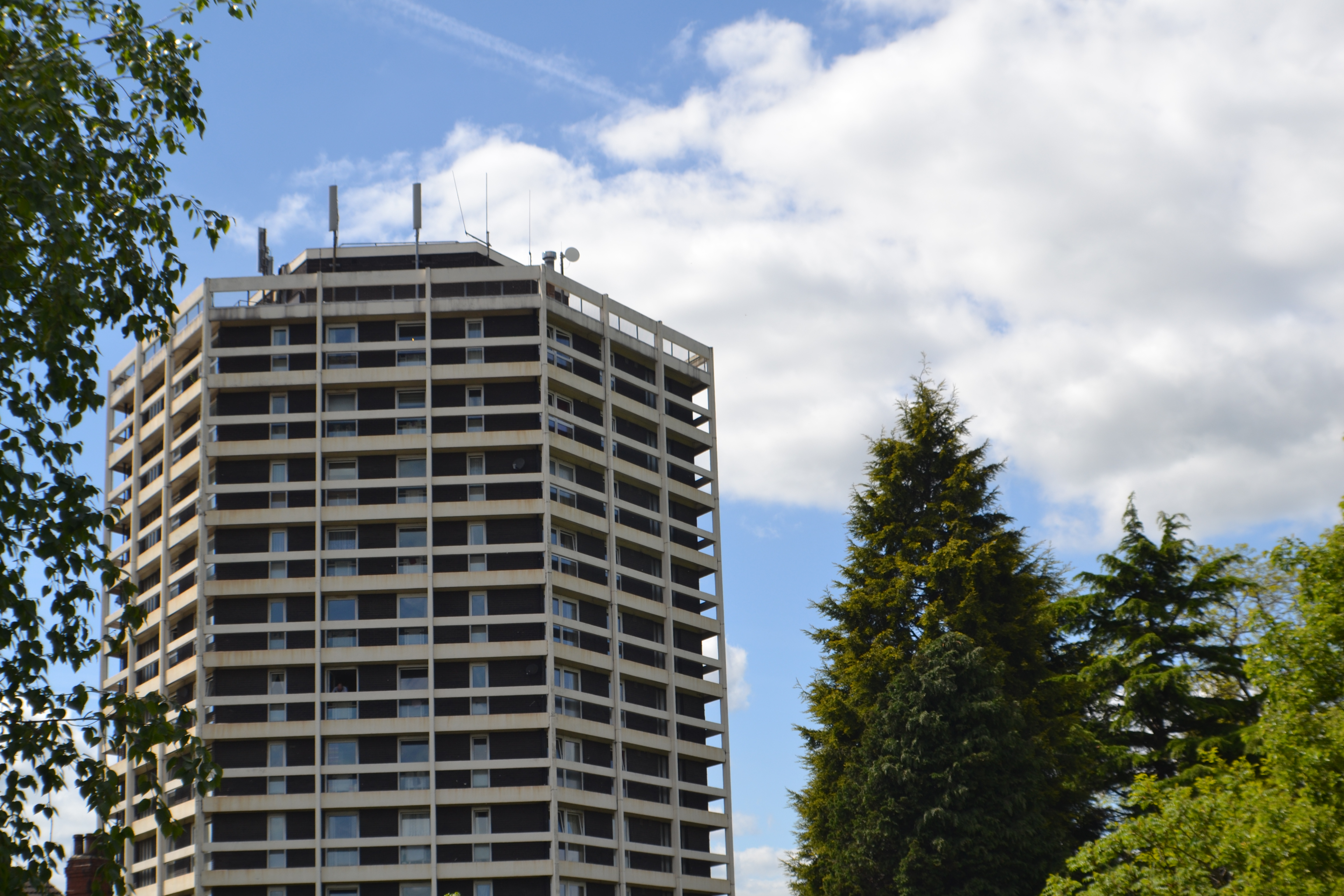
- Beeversleigh Flats

- Location within South Yorkshire
- Metropolitan borough: Rotherham
- Metropolitan county: South Yorkshire
- Region: Yorkshire and the Humber
- Country: England
- Sovereign state: United Kingdom
- Post town: ROTHERHAM
- Postcode district: S65
- Dialling code: 01709
- Police: South Yorkshire
- Fire: South Yorkshire
- Ambulance: Yorkshire
- UK Parliament: Rotherham

Clifton is a suburb of Rotherham, South Yorkshire, England. It is part of the Boston Castle ward of the Metropolitan Borough of Rotherham, which in 2011 had a population of 13,486. It is known for its landmark Beeversleigh Flats, a 40m high tower block with an unusual hexagonal shape, built in 1970 which can be seen from many places across the borough, due in part to its position at the top of a hill. It is positioned just outside Rotherham town centre, bordered by other suburbs such as Eastwood, Broom and East Herringthorpe.

Attractions include Clifton Park, a large recreational area which includes Clifton Park Museum, which re-opened in 2005 following a 2-year refurbishment costing £3 million.
