= Greasbrough =

Suburb of Rotherham, South Yorkshire, England

Coordinates: 53.4543°N 1.3749°W

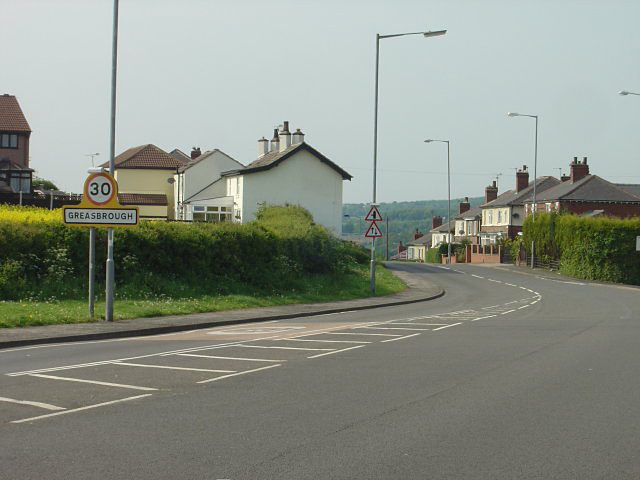
- Entering Greasbrough from Rotherham

- Location within South Yorkshire
- Population: 2,038 (2001)
- OS grid reference: SK4195
- Metropolitan borough: Rotherham
- Metropolitan county: South Yorkshire
- Region: Yorkshire and the Humber
- Country: England
- Sovereign state: United Kingdom
- Post town: ROTHERHAM
- Postcode district: S61
- Dialling code: 01709
- Police: South Yorkshire
- Fire: South Yorkshire
- Ambulance: Yorkshire
- UK Parliament: Rotherham

Greasbrough is a small village in Rotherham, in South Yorkshire, England. The village falls in the Greasbrough Ward of Rotherham Metropolitan Borough Council. Greasbrough had its own local council, Greasbrough UDC (Urban District Council), until its absorption into the County Borough of Rotherham in 1936. Until 1974 it was in the West Riding of Yorkshire.

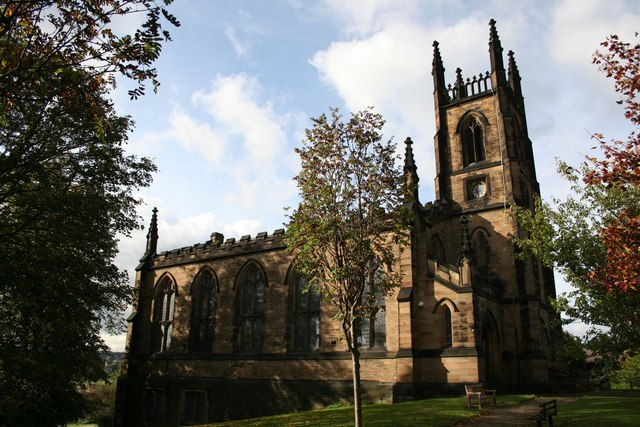
St Mary's church

Greasbrough has 2,038 inhabitants and 2,270 acres (9.2 km^{2}) of land belonging to Earl FitzWilliam. It is located two miles (3 km) north of Rotherham. Greasbrough has a gothic-style church called St. Mary's, which was completed in 1828. A schoolroom is built into the rear lower part of the building. There are also Wesleyan and Independent chapels, also with attached schools. There is a main school in Greasbrough named Greasbrough Junior & Infant School, situated on Munsbrough Rise. This also has a nursery in the same building, starting from the age of 3. Greasbrough also has a football team called Greasbrough Youth, with players from ages 6. It is also well known for its Working Men's Club which has been host to many famous acts over the years such as Johnnie Ray, Bob Monkhouse, Matt Monro and Adam Faith.

== History ==
The name Greasbrough derives from either the Old English gærsenbrōc meaning 'grassy brook', or from grēosnbrōc meaning 'gravelly brook'.

Greasbrough was formerly a chapelry in the parish of Rotherham, in 1866 Greasbrough became a separate civil parish, in 1894 Greasbrough became an urban district containing the parish, on 1 April 1936 the parish was abolished and merged with Rotherham, Rawmarsh and Wentworth and the urban district was abolished and merged with the County Borough of Rotherham, Rotherham Rural District and Rawmarsh Urban District. In 1931 the parish had a population of 3599. It is now in the unparished area of Rotherham.

== Notable residents ==
- Omar Ebrahim, baritone (b. 1956)
- William Hague, Conservative party politician (b. 1961)
- Jack Lambert, footballer (1902–1940)
- John Rose, industrial chemist (1911–1976)
- Laura Jane Suisted, journalist (1840–1903)

== See also ==
- Listed buildings in Rotherham (Wingfield Ward)
- Masbrough Independent Chapel
- Greasbrough War Memorial
