= Wickersley =

Village and civil parish in South Yorkshire, England

Coordinates: 53.4199°N 1.2792°W

- Village and Civil Parish
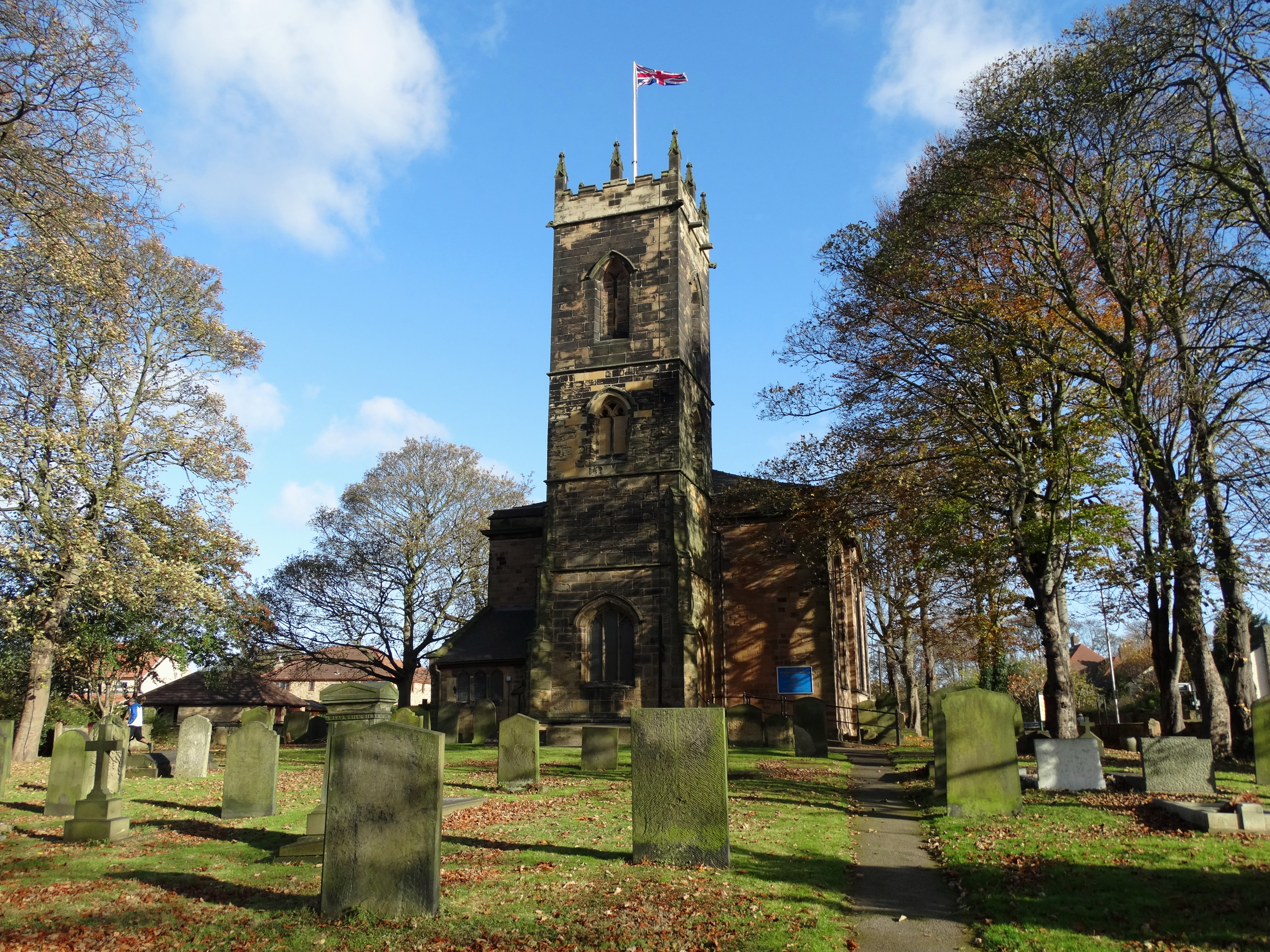
- St Alban's Church

- Location within South Yorkshire
- Population: 7,392 (2011)
- OS grid reference: SK480916
  - London: 135 mi (217 km) SSE
- Civil parish: Wickersley
- Metropolitan borough: Rotherham
- Metropolitan county: South Yorkshire
- Region: Yorkshire and the Humber
- Country: England
- Sovereign state: United Kingdom
- Post town: ROTHERHAM
- Postcode district: S66
- Dialling code: 01709
- Police: South Yorkshire
- Fire: South Yorkshire
- Ambulance: Yorkshire
- UK Parliament: Wentworth and Dearne (UK Parliament constituency)

Wickersley is a village and civil parish in the Metropolitan Borough of Rotherham in South Yorkshire, England, situated 3 miles (5 km) from the centre of Rotherham. The area is very near to road junctions for the M1 and M18 (passing through Bramley, Rotherham). It is home to the secondary school and sixth form, Wickersley School and Sports College.

== Historical background ==
The name Wickersley derives from the Old Norse personal name Vikarr, and the Old English lēah meaning 'wood/clearing'.

Wickersley was once held by Richard FitzTurgis (who adopted the name 'de Wickersley), founder of Roche Abbey, and subsequently by his heirs by marriage, the de Livet (Levett) family. The Wickersleys later removed to Sheffield, where they built the home Broom Hall. The village of Wickersley has a population of 7,235 increasing to 7,392 at the 2011 Census.

Wickersley School and Sports College is one of the area's largest institutions with a student body of over 2,000 eleven to eighteen-year-olds and a teaching staff of over 300.

There are 3 churches in Wickersley. Wickersley's parish church, which is part of the Church of England diocese of Sheffield, is dedicated to St Alban and it is one of the oldest buildings in Wickersley. There is also Blessed Trinity Roman Catholic church, as well as a Methodist church.

In St Alban's Church are the tomb of William Holt Yates physician, philanthropist, and author of a book on the history of Egypt, and a stained glass window commemorating Jonathan Holt Titcomb, first Bishop of Rangoon.

== Modern times ==
Wickersley, in recent years, has become an increasingly affluent village. It has many high end bars and restaurants situated at its centre, because of this, Wickersley is considered to be one of the most desirable places to live in Rotherham.

== Sport ==
- Cricket - Wickersley Old Village CC based on Northfield Lane

== See also ==
- Listed buildings in Wickersley
