= Wingfield Academy =

Academy in Wingfield, Rotherham, South Yorkshire, England

Coordinates: 53.449°N 1.383°W

Location
- Wingfield Road; Wingfield, Rotherham, South Yorkshire, S61 4AU; England

Information
- Type: Academy
- Established: September 1965
- Department for Education URN: 139992 Tables
- Ofsted: Reports
- Chair of Advisory Group: Richard Dunne
- Headteacher: Jordon O'Neill
- Gender: Coeducational
- Age: 11 to 16
- Enrolment: c. 1,000
- Former names: Wingfield Comprehensive School (1965–2006); Wingfield School (2006–2008); Wingfield Business & Enterprise College (2008–2013)
- Website: https://wingfieldacademy.org/

Wingfield Academy is a coeducational secondary school with academy status, located in the Wingfield area of Rotherham, South Yorkshire, England. It has been renamed three times since it opened. It was originally named Wingfield Comprehensive School until September 2006 when it became simply Wingfield School. In September 2008, it became a specialist school and was rebranded as Wingfield Business & Enterprise College. The third rename occurred in August 2013 when the college completed its transition to an academy becoming Wingfield Academy. On 1 December 2020 Wingfield Academy become part of the New Collaborative Learning Trust.

== Ofsted inspections ==
Since the commencement of Ofsted inspections in September 1993, the school has undergone 11 inspections:

Date of inspection	Outcome	Reference
24–?? January 1994	???	
3–?? November 1997	???	
15–?? May 2000	Unsatisfactory (serious weaknesses)	
25–28 November 2002	Unsatisfactory (serious weaknesses)	Report
29–30 March 2004	Unsatisfactory (special measures)	Report
7–8 December 2005	Good	Report
16–17 January 2008	Good	Report
29–30 November 2010	Good	Report
25–26 March 2015	Requires improvement	Report
27–28 April 2017	Good	Report
8–9 June 2022	Good	Report
