= St Bernard's Catholic High School, Rotherham =

Coeducational Catholic secondary school in Rotherham, South Yorkshire, England

St Bernard's Catholic High School

Location
- Herringthorpe Valley Road; Rotherham, South Yorkshire, S65 3BE; England; 53.4237°N 1.3220°W

Information
- Type: Academy
- Motto: 'I have come so that they may have life, and have it to the full' (John 10:10)
- Religious affiliation: Roman Catholic
- Established: 1961
- Local authority: Rotherham MBC
- Department for Education URN: 138329 Tables
- Ofsted: Reports
- Head teacher: Andrew Riding
- Gender: Co-educational
- Age: 11 to 16
- Enrolment: 715
- Houses: Four named after the medieval Cistercian abbeys of Yorkshire: Fountains, Kirkstall, Rievaulx, and Roche
- Colours: Blue, Red, Green, and Yellow
- Website: https://www.sbch.org.uk/

St Bernard's Catholic High School is a coeducational Catholic secondary school with academy status in Rotherham, South Yorkshire, England. Its official opening date was 26 October 1961 at 3 pm. The school motto is "I have come so that they may have life, and have it to the full" (John 10:10). The school prayer is the Memorare of Saint Bernard. The school was originally a 'Specialist School for the Arts', but now it an academy of 'Applied Learning'. St. Bernard's allows students to study various qualifications, such as GCSEs, BTECs and Functional Skills, with most qualifications being equivalent to Level 2. The subject Religious Education (RE) is a mandatory subject at the school and given the same level of importance as English, Mathematics, and the Sciences.

== Ofsted inspections ==
St Bernard's first recorded Ofsted inspection was in February 2001 with the most recent inspection being February 2024.

Date of inspection	Outcome
6–8 February 2001	Very good
8–9 November 2006	Good
10–11 November 2011	Outstanding
20–21 February 2024	Good

== Headteachers ==
- Mr James Joseph O'Connor 1961 – August 1985
- Mr C. J. Giblin 1985 – 1997
- Mrs Eunice Newton 1997 – 2004
- Mr David Butler 2004 – 2014
- Mr Terry Mahon 2014 – 2017
- Mrs Siobhan Kent April 2017 – December 2022
- Mrs Kate Crawford January 2023 – July 2024
- Mr Andrew Riding September 2024 – Present
