= Wingfield, Rotherham =

Suburb of Rotherham, South Yorkshire, England

Coordinates: 53.448°N 1.387°W

Wingfield is a small area in the town of Rotherham, South Yorkshire, England. A Rotherham MBC ward bears this name. The population of the ward at the 2011 Census was 11,835.

Wingfield Academy is a secondary school located in the area.

There is a shop, a bus route, there used to be a swimming baths, now closed.

== See also ==
- Listed buildings in Rotherham (Wingfield Ward)
