= Gervase Phinn =

English author and educator

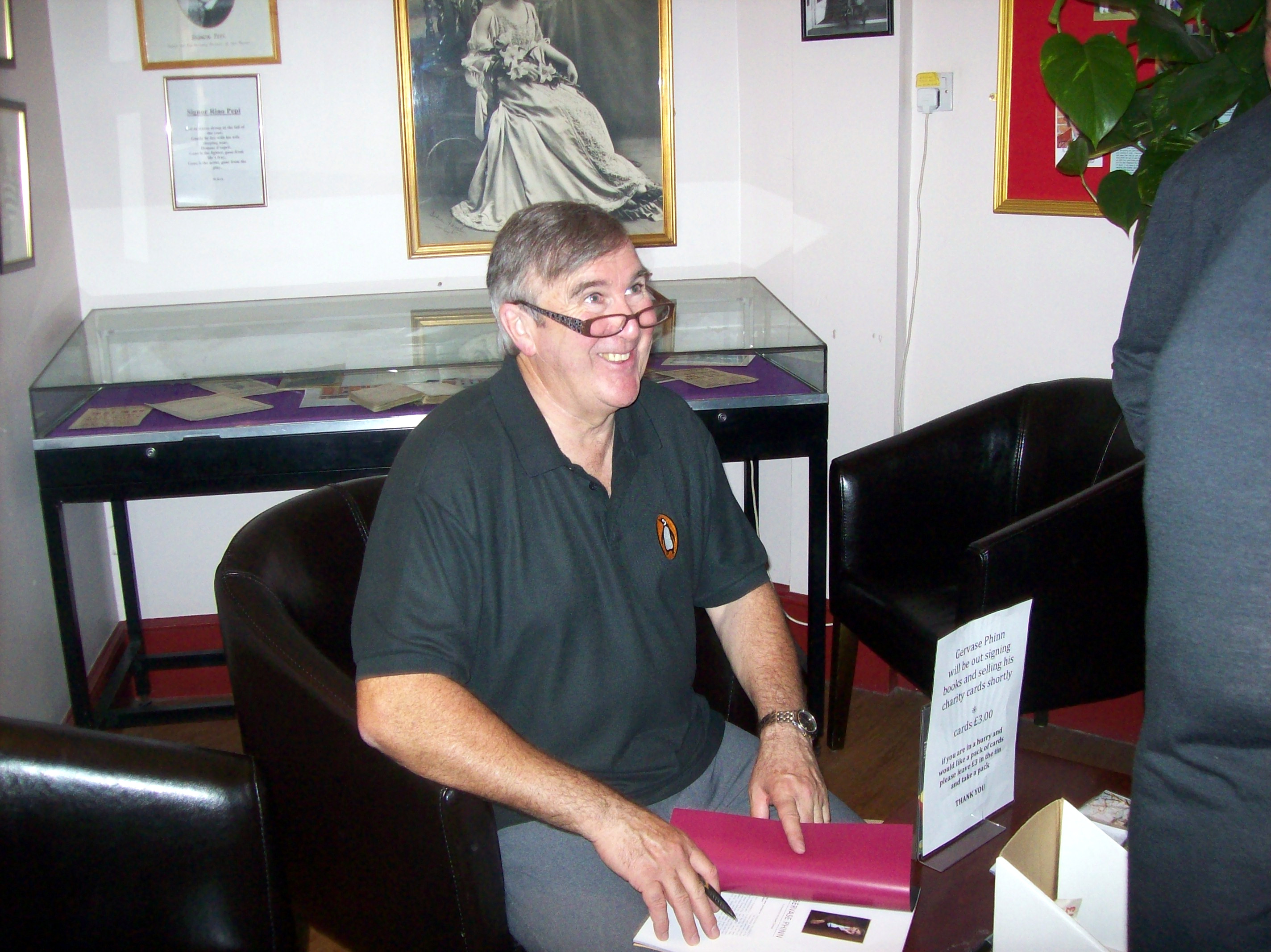
- Gervase Phinn in June 2011
- Born: 27 December 1946 (age 79); Rotherham, England
- Occupations: Teacher, School Inspector, Author, singer
- Relatives: Alec Finn (brother)
- Website: www.gervase-phinn.com

Gervase Phinn (born 27 December 1946) is an English author and educator. After a career as a teacher he became a schools inspector and, latterly, Visiting Professor of Education at the University of Teesside. He graduated from Leeds Trinity University in 1970 with a degree in Education.

He has published five volumes of memoir, collections of poetry and a number of books about education. He has a particular interest in children's literature and literacy.

== Career ==
Phinn taught in a range of schools for fourteen years before becoming an education adviser and school inspector. He is now:

- a freelance lecturer, broadcaster and writer
- President of the School Library Association for 2006–2009
- a consultant for the Open University
- Honorary Fellow of York St John University
- Doctor of Letters of the University of Leicester
- Fellow and Visiting Professor of Education at The University of Teesside.

== Bibliography ==
He has published many articles, chapters and books and edited a range of poetry and short story collections.

His academic texts include:

- Young Readers and their Books, published by David Fulton* Touches of Beauty: Poetry in the Primary School and Reading Matters

He has published collections of his own plays, poems, picture books and short stories, including his anthologies of verse:

- Classroom Creatures
- It Takes One to Know One
- The Day Our Teacher Went Batty
- Family Phantoms

Books of stories for children:

- What's the Matter, Royston Knapper?
- Royston Knapper: The Return of the Rogue
- Our Cat Cuddles (a picture book)

=== Dales series ===
Phinn is probably best known for his memoirs, many of which he has read as audiobooks:

- The Other Side of the Dale (1998, Michael Joseph)
- Over Hill and Dale (2000, Michael Joseph)
- Head Over Heels in the Dales (2002, Michael Joseph)
- Up and Down in the Dales (2004, Michael Joseph)
- The Heart of the Dales (2007, Michael Joseph)

=== Associated books ===
- A Wayne in a Manger

=== Others ===
- All These Lonely People (2009, Penguin Books)
- Out of the Woods but Not Over the Hill (2010, Hodder & Stoughton)
- The Little Village School (2011, Hodder & Stoughton)
- Trouble at the Little Village School (2012, Hodder & Stoughton)
- The School Inspector Calls! (2014, Hodder & Stoughton)
- A Lesson in Love (2015, Hodder & Stoughton)
- Secrets at the Little Village School (2016, Hodder & Stoughton)
- Road to the Dales – The story of a Yorkshire Lad (2010, Penguin) – a memoir of his early childhood

== Television and radio appearances ==
- Esther (BBC1)
- Midweek (BBC Radio 4)
- You and Yours (BBC Radio 4)
- Open House with Gloria Hunniford (ITV)
- North East Tonight (Tyne Tees Television)
- Today programme (BBC Radio 4)
- Calendar (Yorkshire Television)
- Breakfast Television (BBC1)
- The Heaven and Earth Show (BBC 2)
- The Des O'Connor Show (LWT)
- Quote... Unquote (BBC Radio 4)
- Look North (BBC 1)
- The Big Toe Radio Show (BBC Radio 7)
- Just One Chance (BBC 2)
- Book at Bedtime (BBC Radio 4)
- Book of the Week (BBC Radio 4)
- A Good Read (BBC Radio 4)

== Honours ==
In 2004 Gervase Phinn received "The Speaker of the Year Award" from the Association of Speakers' Clubs. Up and Down in the Dales, won the Customer Choice Award at the Spoken Book Awards.

In 2005 the highest academic award of Sheffield Hallam University, Doctor of the University (D.Univ.) was conferred upon him by the Chancellor, Professor Lord Winston. He is a Fellow of the Royal Society of Arts and an Honorary Fellow of the English Speaking Board.
