= Broom, South Yorkshire =

Village in South Yorkshire, England

Coordinates: 53.42°N 1.33°W

Broom
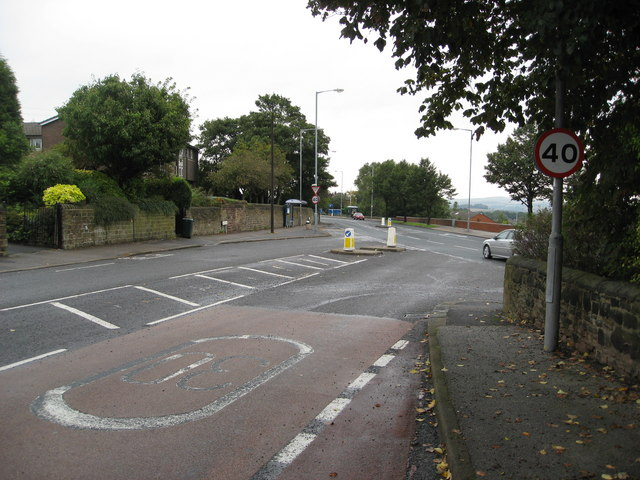
- Road junction in Broom

- Location within South Yorkshire
- Population: 900
- OS grid reference: SK444915
- Metropolitan borough: Rotherham
- Metropolitan county: South Yorkshire
- Region: Yorkshire and the Humber
- Country: England
- Sovereign state: United Kingdom
- Post town: ROTHERHAM
- Postcode district: S60
- Dialling code: 01709
- Police: South Yorkshire
- Fire: South Yorkshire
- Ambulance: Yorkshire
- UK Parliament: Rotherham

Broom (sometimes historically spelled "Broome") is a Rotherham suburb in South Yorkshire, England and is located in the former parish of Whiston about 2 miles (3 km) southeast of Rotherham. Broom sits on top of a former Roman fortification and was the site of a Saxon trading town. The suburb currently has a population of around 900. Broom mostly consists of semi-detached housing and supports three pubs, a football club, Broom United, and numerous other small businesses.
