= Rotherham Girls' High School =

Location
- Middle Lane; Rotherham, South Yorkshire; England; 53.43246°N 1.33899°W

Information
- Type: County school
- Established: 1906
- Closed: 1973
- Local authority: Rotherham
- Gender: Girls
- Age: 11 to 18

Rotherham Girls' Grammar School was a grammar school in Rotherham.

== History ==
The school was taken over by Rotherham Corporation in 1906. It moved to Middle Lane in 1910. It closed in 1973 and a comprehensive school, Clifton Comprehensive School, opened in the same buildings.

== Headmistresses ==
- 1906–1908: Miss Law
- 1908–1916: Miss Strudwick
- 1916–1920: Miss Smith
- 1920–1922: Mrs Mair (née Moss)
- 1922–1931: Miss Harding
- 1931–1938: Miss Varly
- 1938–1946: Miss Dencer
- 1947–1953: Miss Ayles
- 1953–1960: Mrs Castle
- 1960–1973: Mrs Ridge (continued as head of Clifton Comprehensive School)
