= Rotherham Grammar School =

Location
- Moorgate Road; Rotherham, South Yorkshire; England

Information
- Type: Grammar school, becoming County school
- Motto: Latin: Ne Ingrati Videamur (Lest We Should Seem Ungrateful)
- Established: 1483
- Closed: 1967
- Local authority: Rotherham
- Headmaster: Mr Arthur Prust (at closure)
- Gender: Boys
- Age: 11 to 18

Rotherham Grammar School was a boys' grammar school in Rotherham, South Yorkshire, England.

== History ==
In 1482 Thomas Rotherham founded the College of Jesus in Rotherham, which was both a school and a religious institution. In March 1482 he began to build a brick building to house his college, on the site of his birthplace in Brookgate, and provided an endowment to fund a Provost and three Fellows. The college was expropriated about 1550 by King Edward VI, but was later re-founded as Rotherham Grammar School, taking the foundation by Rotherham as its origin. The school occupied a number of buildings in Rotherham before moving into a former Congregational ministers' training college on Moorgate Road in 1890.

In 1967, the local education authority introduced comprehensive education in Rotherham, and the school was closed. Its buildings became a coeducational sixth form college, known as Thomas Rotherham College, which retains the old grammar school's coat of arms in its logo.

== Provosts' schoolmasters ==
- Edmund Carter, 1482–1483
- John Bockyng, 1483 (died in office)
- John More, from 1501
- Robert Collier, from 1508
- Richard Bradshaw, 1524–1525
- William Drapour, from 1535
- Thomas Snell, from 1548

== Masters and Headmasters ==
- William Beck, 1566–1567
- Thomas Woodhouse, from 1568
- Robert Sanderson, from 1583
- Smith, from 1616
- Barrow, from 1620
- Bonner, ????–????
- Charles Hoole Rayte, from 1633
- Graunt, ????-????
- Barton, ????
- Withers, from 1704
- Rev. Christopher Stevenson, from 1725
- Rev. Davis Pennell, from 1746
- John Russell, from 1763
- Tennant, from 1776
- Rev. Richard U. Burton, from 1780
- Rev. Benjamin Birkett, from 1810
- Rev. Joshua Nalson, from 1839
- Edwin A. Fewtrell, from 1841
- R. A. Long-Phillips, from 1863
- Rev. John J. Christie, from 1864
- Rev. George Ohlson, from 1878
- Rev. Thos. Granger Hutt, from 1883
- Rev. Hargreaves Heap, from 1884
- W. A. Barron, from 1919
- Frederick William Field, from 1924
- Gilbert E. Gunner, 1949 – August 1966
- Mr Arthur Prust, September 1966 – August 1967 (continued as principal of Thomas Rotherham College)

== Notable pupils ==
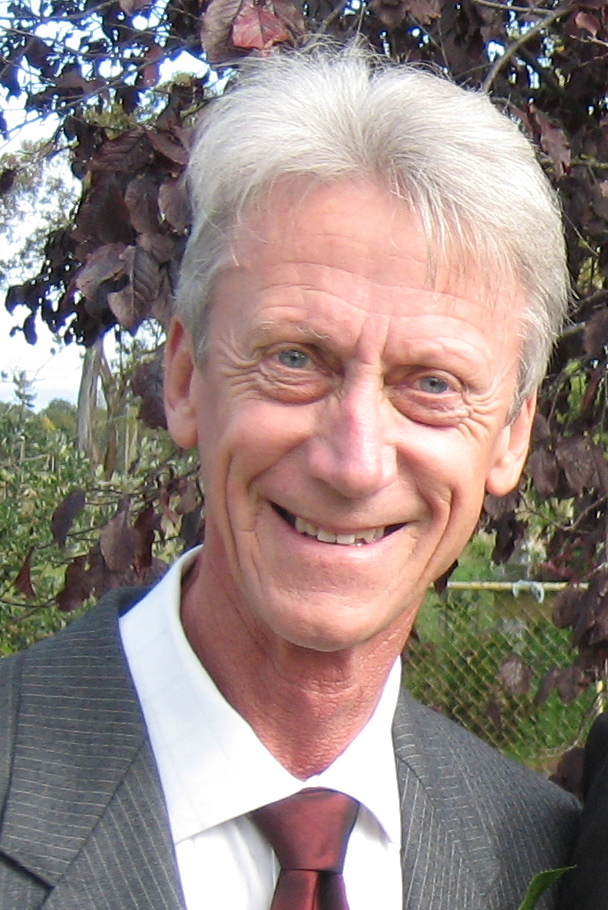
John D Brooks, Food Microbiologist

- Bishop Robert Sanderson (1587–1663), moderator of the 1661 Savoy Conference. Two of the prayers in the Church of England's Book of Common Prayer have often been attributed to Sanderson. These are the "general thanksgiving" and the "prayer for all conditions of men".
- Herbert Austin, 1st Baron Austin – founded the Austin Motor Company, and Conservative MP from 1918 to 1924 for Birmingham King's Norton
- Sir Donald Bailey, inventor of the Bailey bridge
- Prof Robert Auty, Professor of Comparative Slavonic Philology from 1965 to 1978 at the University of Oxford, and President from 1964 to 1967 of the British University Association of Slavists (became the British Association for Slavonic and East European Studies in 1989)
- Prof George Bentley, Professor of Orthopaedic Surgery from 1982 to 2002 at the University College London Medical School
- Sidney Brazier, bomb-disposal expert
- Stanley Crowther, Labour MP from 1976 to 1992 for Rotherham
- Sir Liam Donaldson, Chief Medical Officer from 1998 to 2010
- Alfred Goldstein, civil engineer, responsible for designing the M23, the Belfast Transportation Plan, Clifton Bridge (A52) in Nottingham, Winthorpe Bridge (A1) at Newark, the Itchen Bridge in Southampton, and the Elizabeth Bridge in Cambridge
- George Charles Gray, organist
- John Harris (novelist)
- Robert Jenkins, President from 1951 to 1953 and 1973–1975 of The Welding Institute
- Walter Jenkins, Vice Chancellor from 1953 to 1958 of the University of Dhaka
- Prof Harry Kay, Vice Chancellor from 1973 to 1984 of the University of Exeter, Professor of Psychology from 1960 to 1973 at the University of Sheffield, and President from 1971 to 1972 of the British Psychological Society
- Donald McWhinnie, theatre director
- John Rose (chemist)
- Sgt. Ian McKay, VC, Falklands campaign (RGS 1964–1969)
- Prof John Brooks, Professor of Food Microbiology from 2007 to 2014 at Auckland University of Technology, New Zealand
- Prof. Alan Hedge, Professor of Human Factors and Ergonomics from 1987 to 2019 at Cornell University, Ithaca, USA.

== See also ==
- List of the oldest schools in the United Kingdom
