= Rotherham College =

- Rotherham, South Yorkshire, S65 1EG; England

Information
- Type: Further Education college
- Motto: Skills for your future
- Established: 1853: Rotherham School of Science and Art; 1981: Rotherham College of Arts and Technology; 2016: Rotherham College
- Local authority: Rotherham
- Department for Education URN: 130527 Tables
- Ofsted: Reports
- Chair: Ken Barrass
- Chief Executive: John Connolly
- Staff: 400+
- Gender: Mixed
- Age: 16 (does sometimes accept from 14)+
- Enrolment: 7,000
- Colour: Blue
- Website: rotherham.ac.uk

View of Rotherham College main building

Rotherham College (formerly Rotherham College of Arts and Technology shortened to RCAT) is a further education college in Rotherham, South Yorkshire, England. It was established as Rotherham School of Science and Art in the 19th century.

From the 1930s, it provided technical-orientated education from the Howard building on Eastwood Lane, Rotherham. In 1981, three neighbouring colleges of arts, technology and adult education were merged into one. As a result, the college became known as Rotherham College of Arts and Technology (RCAT).

In August 2004, Rotherham College merged with the Dinnington-based further education provider, Rother Valley College.

On 1 February 2016, Rotherham College merged with North Notts College to create a new education and training organisation, the RNN Group. The name, Rotherham College, was retained for the two campuses.

On 1 February 2017, Dearne Valley College joined the RNN Group. Alongside the three colleges, the RNN Group also incorporates an apprenticeship business, RNN Training, and a number of subsidiary companies which cover a range of specialist training sectors. The RNN Group was criticised by OFSTED, for its poor oversight of subcontractors in 2018.

== Campuses ==
Rotherham College has two campuses, Rotherham Town Centre campus (TCC) and Dinnington campus (DC). The Town Centre campus is situated on Eastwood Lane and the Dinnington campus on Doe Quarry Lane, Dinnington.

The Town Centre campus contains four buildings, the Eastwood Building, the Wentworth Building and the Clifton building (the latter two of which are connected to each other), and the Construction Centre, which is on the other side of town near Rotherham Interchange, towards the Parkgate.

== Notable alumni ==
- Sean Bean – actor
- Howard Webb – professional football referee
- Peter Elliott – Olympic distance runner
- Lee Malia - guitarist for Bring Me The Horizon
- Matt Nicholls - drummer for Bring Me The Horizon
