= Wickersley School and Sports College =

Location
- Bawtry Road; Wickersley; Rotherham, South Yorkshire, S66 1JL; England; 53.4214°N 1.2734°W

Information
- Type: Academy comprehensive school
- Motto: High Expectations
- Established: 1909
- Local authority: Rotherham Metropolitan Council
- Department for Education URN: 140646 Tables
- Ofsted: Reports
- Head teacher: Tony Hardcastle
- Gender: Mixed
- Age: 11 to 18
- Enrolment: 1,984 (July 2026)
- Capacity: 2,280
- Former names: Bramley and Wickersley School; Wickersley Comprehensive School
- Website: www.wickersley.net

Wickersley School and Sports College is a coeducational secondary school and sixth form with academy status, located in Wickersley in the Metropolitan Borough of Rotherham, South Yorkshire, England.

The school has 2,150 pupils, aged 11–18, and 171 teachers. Wickersley has a resource base for Secondary Hearing Impaired Pupils, with a further 14 pupils. The head teacher is Tony Hardcastle. The school is the lead partner in Wickersley Partnership Trust, supporting Clifton and Rawmarsh Schools in Rotherham.

== Ofsted inspections ==
Since the commencement of Ofsted inspections in September 1993, the school has undergone five full inspections:

Date of inspection	Outcome	Reference
27 November – 1 December 2000	Good	Report
15 March 2006	Good	Report
26–27 November 2008	Outstanding	Report
18–19 September 2013	Outstanding	Report
22-23 November 2023	Good	Report

== Headteachers ==
- Mr. A. Matthews, 1969–1979
- Mr. S. Carter JP, 1979–1989
- Mr. J. T. Deeley, 1989 – December 2001
- David Hudson, January 2002 – 2014
- Elaine Renevant, 2014-2021
- Tony Hardcastle, 2021-present
