= Thomas Rotherham College =

Location
- Moorgate Road; Rotherham, South Yorkshire, S60 2BE; England; 53.41962°N 1.35071°W

Information
- Type: 16–19 academy
- Motto: Latin: Ne Ingrati Videamur (Lest We Should Appear Ungrateful)
- Established: 1967; 59 years ago
- Founder: Thomas Rotherham
- Local authority: Rotherham
- Department for Education URN: 145230 Tables
- Ofsted: Reports
- Principal: Joel Wirth
- Age: 16 to 19
- Website: https://www.trc.ac.uk/

Thomas Rotherham College is a college for 16 to 19-year-olds, founded in 1967, in Rotherham, South Yorkshire, England.

== History ==
=== Grammar school ===
The college has its origins in Rotherham Grammar School (founded 1483), whose buildings it took over. In the 1960s, the grammar school had around 600 boys and was administered by the County Borough of Rotherham Education Committee.

=== Sixth form college ===
The Thomas Rotherham College took its name from the fifteenth-century prelate and statesman Thomas Rotherham, the original founder of the grammar school. Thomas Rotherham was archbishop of York from 1480 until his death in 1500. He was at various times an ambassador, and keeper of the Privy Seal. Twice, he was Lord Chancellor of England.

The Thomas Rotherham College took its first intake of students in September 1967. It was formally inaugurated on Friday 15 March 1968 by Thomas Rotherham's successor as Archbishop of York, Donald Coggan. Dr Coggan was appointed Archbishop of Canterbury in 1974.

For the first few years, the grammar school and the new Thomas Rotherham College operated alongside each other in the same buildings, until the last of the grammar school boys reached the sixth form (c. 1971). The last intake of grammar school boys was in September 1966.

By the early 1970s the college had 400 students, and 500 by the mid-1980s.

Incorporation

Along with all other colleges, TRC was incorporated and left local authority control on 1 April 1993. Incorporated status for the college lasted from then until 2017.

Academisation

Thomas Rotherham College converted from being a sixth form college to a 16–19 academy, within the Inspire Trust, on 1 November 2017. A new logo – similar in style to other establishments in the trust, while retaining aspects from the college's (and grammar school's) old logo – was introduced in September 2019. In the initial stages, no new principal was appointed to replace Dr Richard Williams. Dr Stephan Jungnitz, previously of Hartlepool College, was then appointed. By summer 2018 Thomas Rotherham had its first female headteacher, Shirley-Ann Brookes-Mills. She left after six months in the post. Eventually it was decided to continue long-term without a principal.

=== The college building (1876) ===
The main building of what is now the Thomas Rotherham College is a Grade II Listed building. It was built as a theological college training ministers for Congregational churches. The site (originally 8.5 acres) had been bought in 1870, for £3,200. But, the building project was delayed owing to the commercial upheaval arising from the outbreak of the Franco-Prussian War. The foundation stone was eventually laid on 23 April 1874. The building was executed in "collegiate Gothic" at a cost of £23,000, and it was opened on 20 September 1876.

The building was designed by William Gillbee Habershon and Alfred Robert Pite. Their architectural practice was in London. However, WG Habershon was from the Habershon family of Rotherham. The Habershons were a Congregational family. WG's grandfather and two of his uncles were the founders of the Habershons steel rolling mills (JJ Habershon & Sons). WG's first-cousin Alderman John Matthew Habershon was the first mayor of Rotherham (1871 and 1872). John Matthew's grandson was mayor in 1922. WG's father (also an architect) had designed the Kimberworth Parish Church. WG's younger brother was the architect Matthew Edward Habershon.

The new Rotherham Congregational College was in use for only twelve years. In 1888, it amalgamated with the Congregational College at Bradford and the merged college operated from the Bradford premises. The Rotherham building was no longer needed and it was sold to become the premises of the Rotherham Grammar School. The School moved into the building in around 1890.

== Inspections ==
Like all colleges, Thomas Rotherham College underwent two Further Education Funding Council inspections in the 1990s. Since the inspection of colleges was transferred to Ofsted in 2001, the college has undergone six further inspections:

Date of inspection	Outcome	Reference
September–November 1995	Good	
April 1999	Good	
8–12 November 2004	Satisfactory	
16–20 March 2009	Satisfactory	
2–5 October 2012	Requires improvement	
14–17 January 2014	Good	
17–19 January 2018	Requires improvement	
1–3 October 2019	Good	
19-22 March 2024	Outstanding	

== Principals ==
- Arthur Prust, September 1967–December 1982 (previously the last headmaster of Rotherham Grammar School)
- James C. Garton, January 1983–????
- Nigel Briggs, ????–December 1997
- Giles Pepler, January 1998–August 2006
- Dr Richard Williams, September 2006–December 2017
- Dr Stephan Jungnitz, January 2018–June 2018 (interim principal)
- Shirley-Ann Brookes-Mills, June 2018–December 2018
- David Naisbitt, December 2018–August 2019
- Joel Wirth, August 2019–Present

== Notable alumni ==
- Nazir Ahmed, Baron Ahmed
- Justine Greening
- James May
- Tracey McDermott
- Mike Riley
- Jamie Vardy
- David Wetherall
- Manasse Kianga

== See also ==
- Listed buildings in Rotherham (Boston Castle Ward)
