= Dinnington High School =

Secondary school in South Yorkshire, England

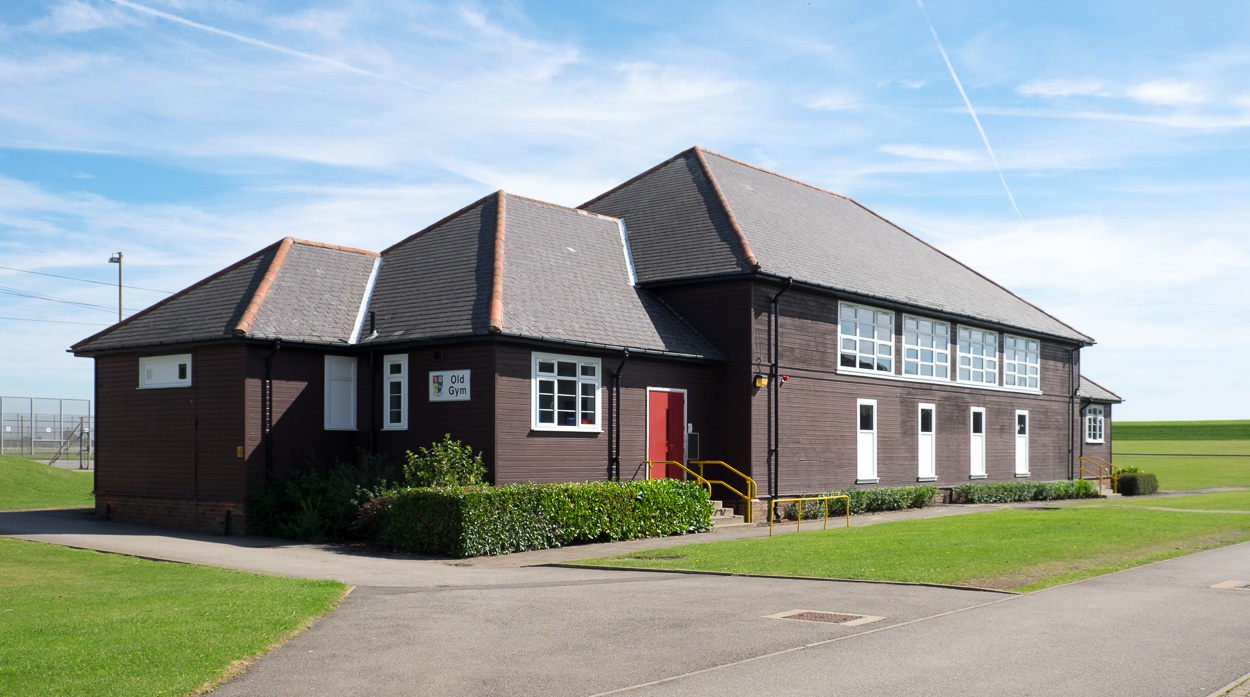
- Dinnington High School in 2016

Location
- Doe Quarry Lane; Dinnington, South Yorkshire, S25 2NZ; England; 53.37401°N 1.20476°W

Information
- Type: Academy
- Motto: Achieving Excellence
- Established: 1935; 91 years ago
- Local authority: Rotherham
- Trust: New Collaborative Learning Trust
- Department for Education URN: 150938 Tables
- Ofsted: Reports
- Headteacher: Kerry Wade
- Gender: Mixed
- Age: 11 to 18
- Enrolment: 1,231
- Capacity: 1,444
- Campus size: 50 acres
- Houses: Segrave; Hatfield; Athorpe; Osborne
- Colours: Navy Blue; Light Blue
- Alumni: Old Dinnonians
- Former names: Dinnington Senior Boys' School (1935–1957); Dinnington Senior Girls' School (1935–1957); Dinnington Secondary Modern School (1957–1963); Dinnington High School (1963–1974); Dinnington Comprehensive School (1974–2015)
- Uniform: White Shirt, House Tie, Black Blazer, Black Jumper, Black Trousers
- Website: https://www.dinningtonhigh.co.uk/
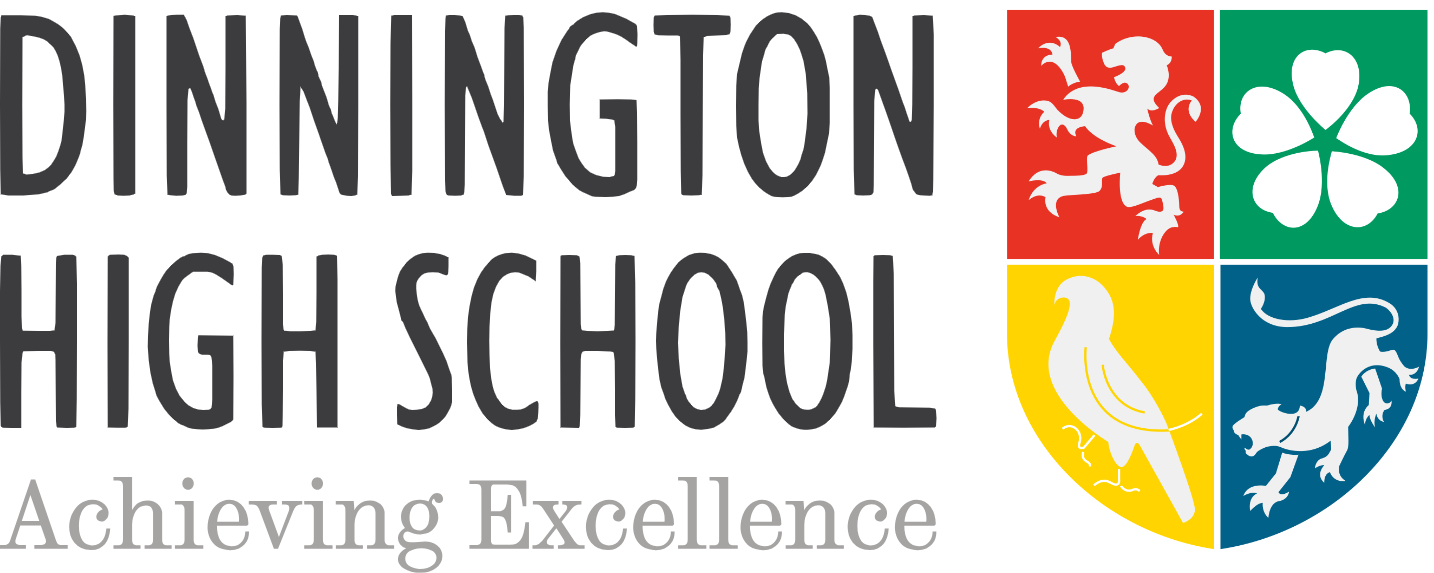

Dinnington High School is a coeducational comprehensive school and Sixth Form in Dinnington, in the Metropolitan Borough of Rotherham, South Yorkshire, England. Much of the school's campus was designed by architect Basil Spence. Former pupils of Dinnington High School are known as Old Dinnonians, and they include 19th century criminal Charles Peace and historian Ebenezer Rhodes.

The school is based entirely on a 50-acre estate, containing all academic buildings and facilities, including the ruins of an 18th-century folly, and a well-preserved 20th century traditional gymnasium. There are 984 students in the school. All students are day pupils between the ages of 11 and 18, and are predominantly from Dinnington and the surrounding settlements. Admissions to the lower school are non-selective; the sixth form offers places on academic conditions.

== History ==
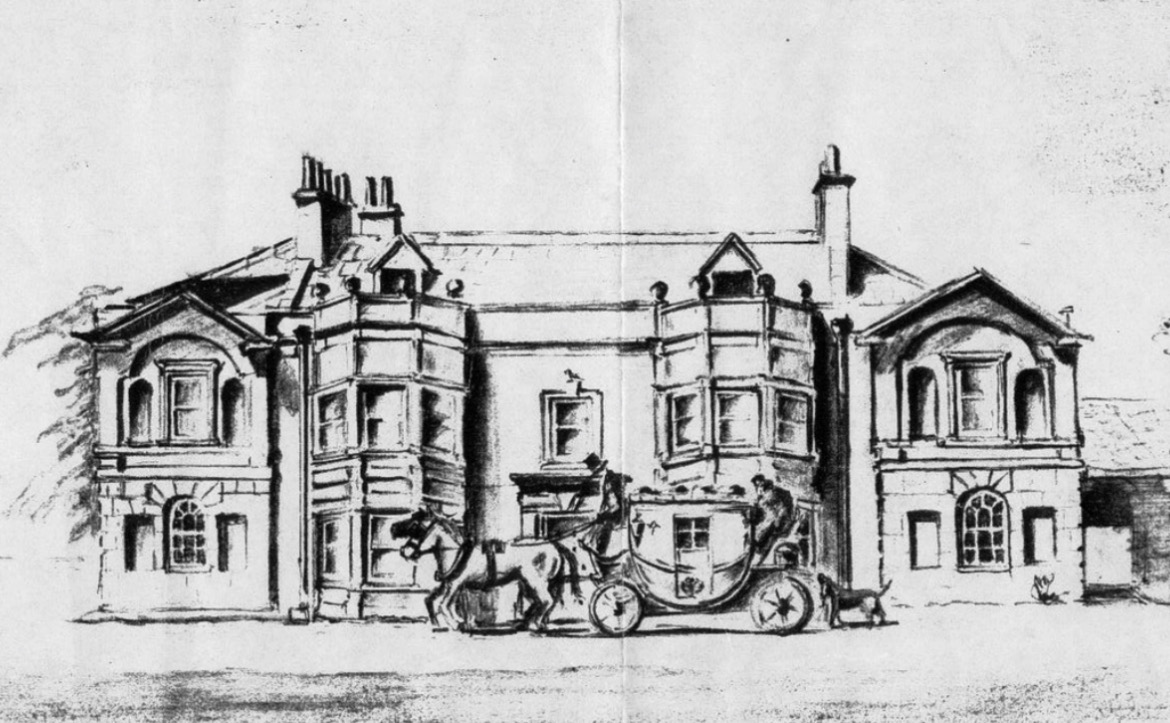
The first school in Dinnington. Teaching first began in 1743 at Dinnington Hall, which still stands.

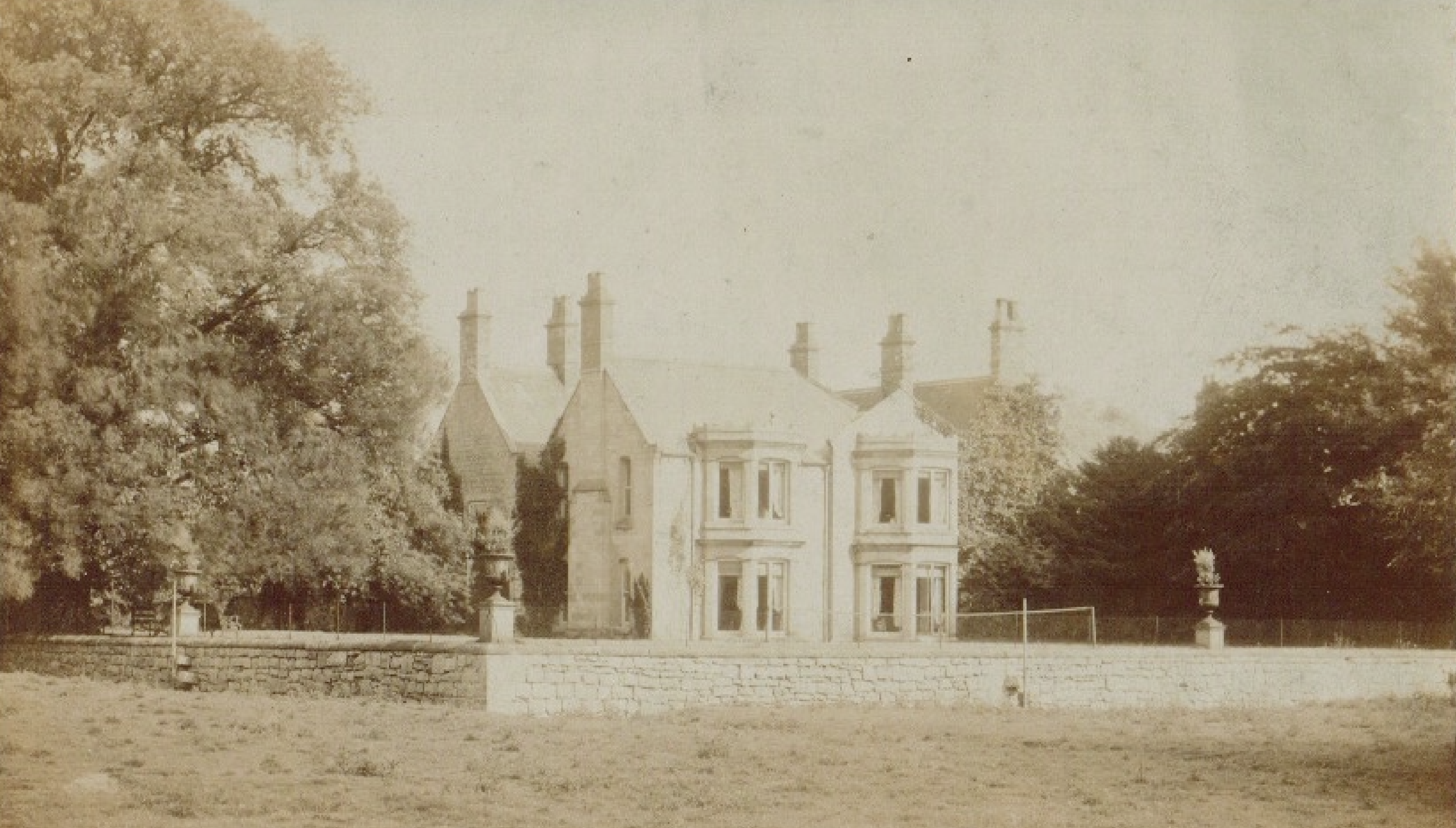
Throapham housed school teaching classrooms until its demolition in the 1970s

=== Early years ===
The first school in Dinnington was The Dinnington School, founded in 1743. It was a small dame school in the town, only large enough to accommodate the local demands at the time. As the population of Dinnington grew the school expanded and moved locations a number of times. The Fisher Education Act of 1918 made Secondary Education compulsory up to the age of 14, which placed a strain on the mixed department of the school. To relieve stress on the Dinnington School, discussions began in 1931 for a new Secondary Department in Dinnington; the former school became a Junior School, with the over-10s moving to the new Secondary Department.

The new school was built on the grounds of Throapham Manor, and was opened in 1935 by Sir Percy Jackson, chair of the West Riding Local Education Authority, as Dinnington Senior Boys' School and Dinnington Senior Girls' School. The school consisted of a single timber building, constructed at the cost of around £21,300, and divided into girls' and boys' departments. In 1938 the building was extended and a separate gymnasium was added. The Manor House was also used for teaching and housed 11 classrooms until its demolition in the 1970s. The woodland at the back of the school still contains the remains and ruins of old outbuildings.

=== War and military occupation ===
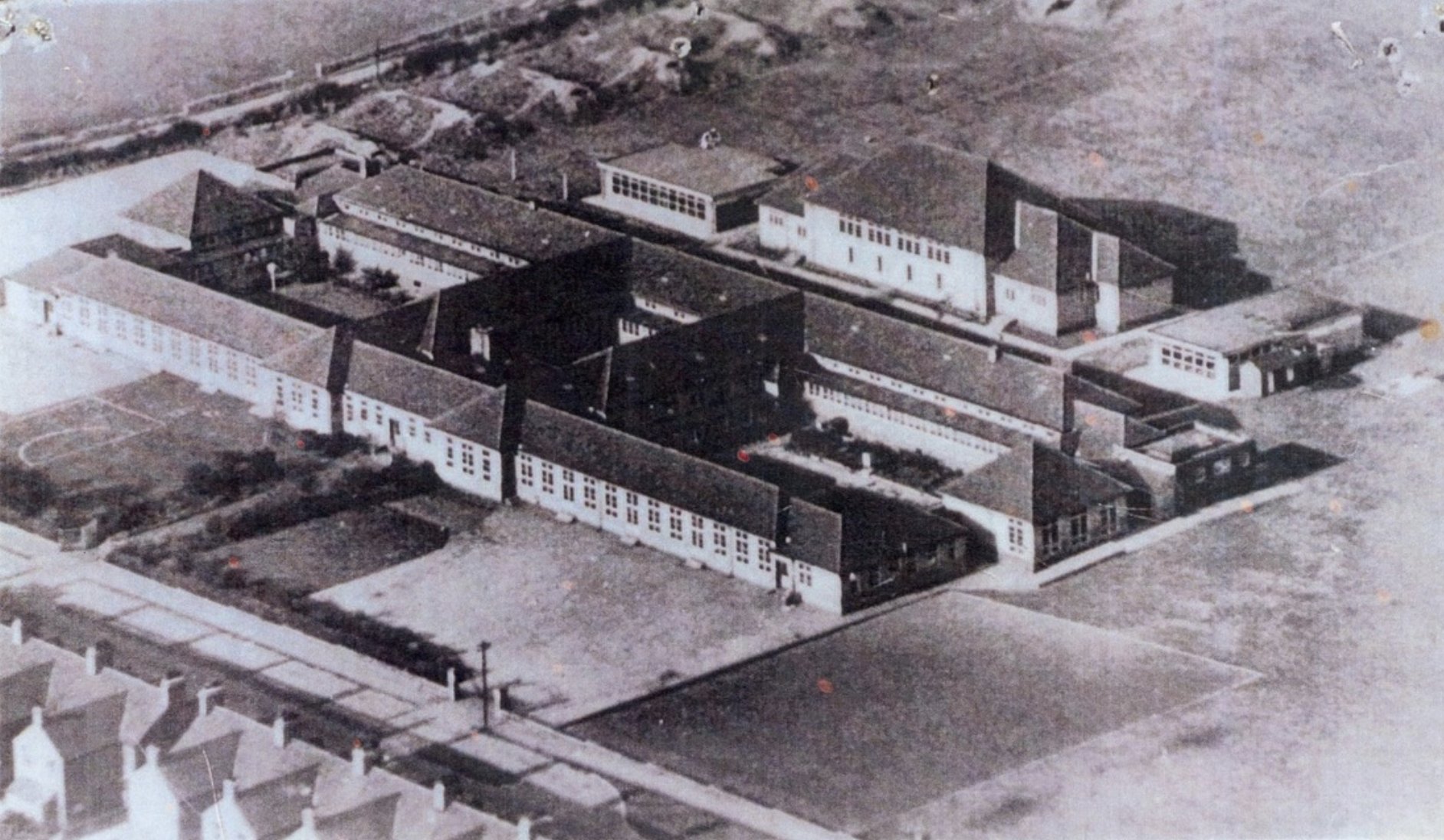
Dinnington High School, Lower School, with air raid shelters dug off Manor Lane

After the outbreak of the Second World War in 1939, Lieutenant Pepper and Sergeant Major Cressey were keen to obtain school buildings as barracks. They had received instructions to take only half the school and were anticipating immediate permission for such a step. The military occupied the school on 14 September 1939 at about 13:30. The Boys' Department was broken up into groups of 50 pupils who were taught in the school on successive days. The girls' domestic science classrooms were used to provide school meals, as the servery was in use by the soldiers. Objections by the school were made, as the presence of soldiers made Dinnington a military target. As a result, all military personnel were asked to leave by 30 September. By way of recompense, the military dug the school regulation military-occupation trenches.

Air raid shelters were completed on school grounds in April 1940. The school turned over its playing fields for farming vegetables. Bees were also kept for honey, and a pig-sty was built to house 11 pigs.

=== Merger and expansion ===
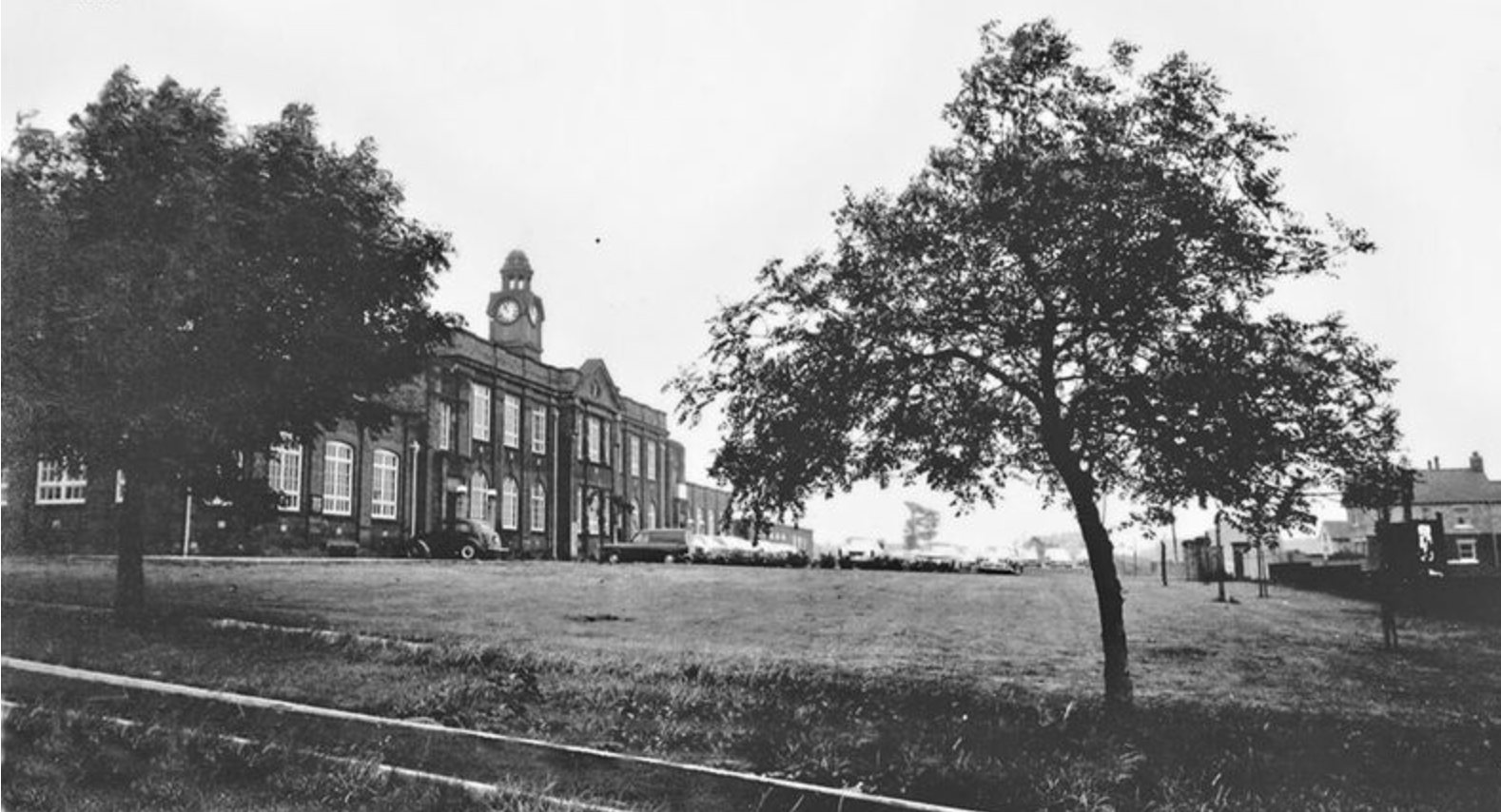
The College Building

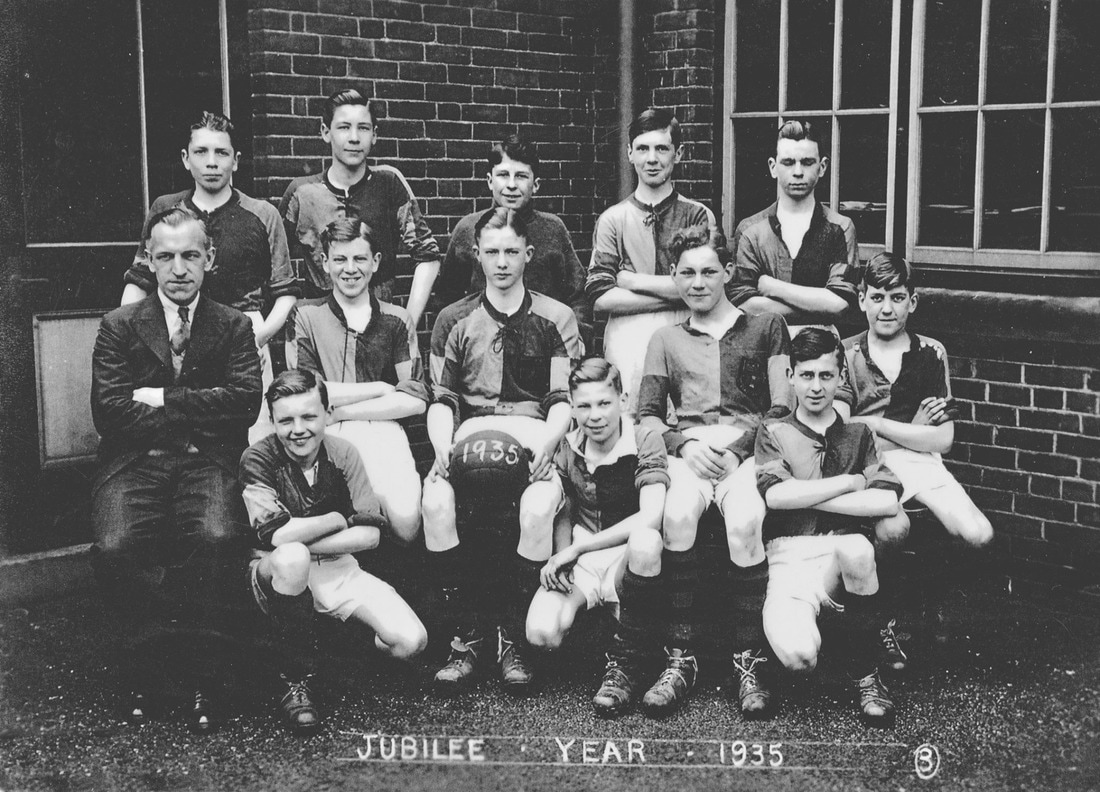
Boys' Football Team 1935

In 1957 the two halves merged to form the coeducational Dinnington Secondary Modern School, with proposals under discussion for a further merger with the secondary technical element of the neighbouring Dinnington Chelmsford Technical College, to create the area's first comprehensive school.

This comprehensive school, Dinnington High School, opened on 23 September 1963 (with a formal opening taking place a year later, conducted by Jack Longland). The area between the two merging establishments was developed into a new campus by Basil Spence & Partners. As the first comprehensive school in the region, Dinnington High School was intended to be a showpiece to the country on the progression of education in the UK; it is for this reason that Dinnington's campus is well-equipped for a British state school, consisting of four house bases and a sixth form college, along with a new main hall and a second gym. Half of the school's current buildings were designed by Spence, including the 1950s house complex to the west of the school, notable for its geometric layout and suspended glass corridors. In 2012 The school's Old Gym was described by Woodsetts History Society Charity as '[The] most well preserved example of traditional 20th century public school architecture in England'.

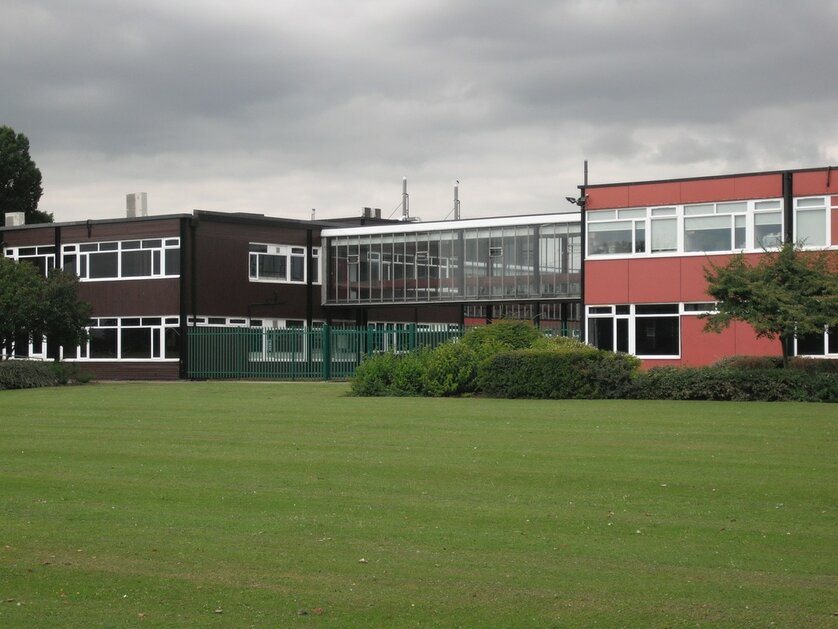
Flyover between Athorpe House (Left) and Sixth Form Base (Right)

The school played a key role in the introduction of rugby union to the local area, and in turn to the establishment of Dinnington Rugby Club, which has produced players for the county and for Senior clubs such as Rotherham, Harlequins and Northampton.

The campus continued to be extended following the merger, with the addition of a swimming pool, technology block, sports hall, new sixth form base and library in the 1970s and 1980s. The school came under the control of the new Rotherham Metropolitan Borough Council in 1974 and was renamed Dinnington Comprehensive School.

=== Fire, arson and redevelopment ===
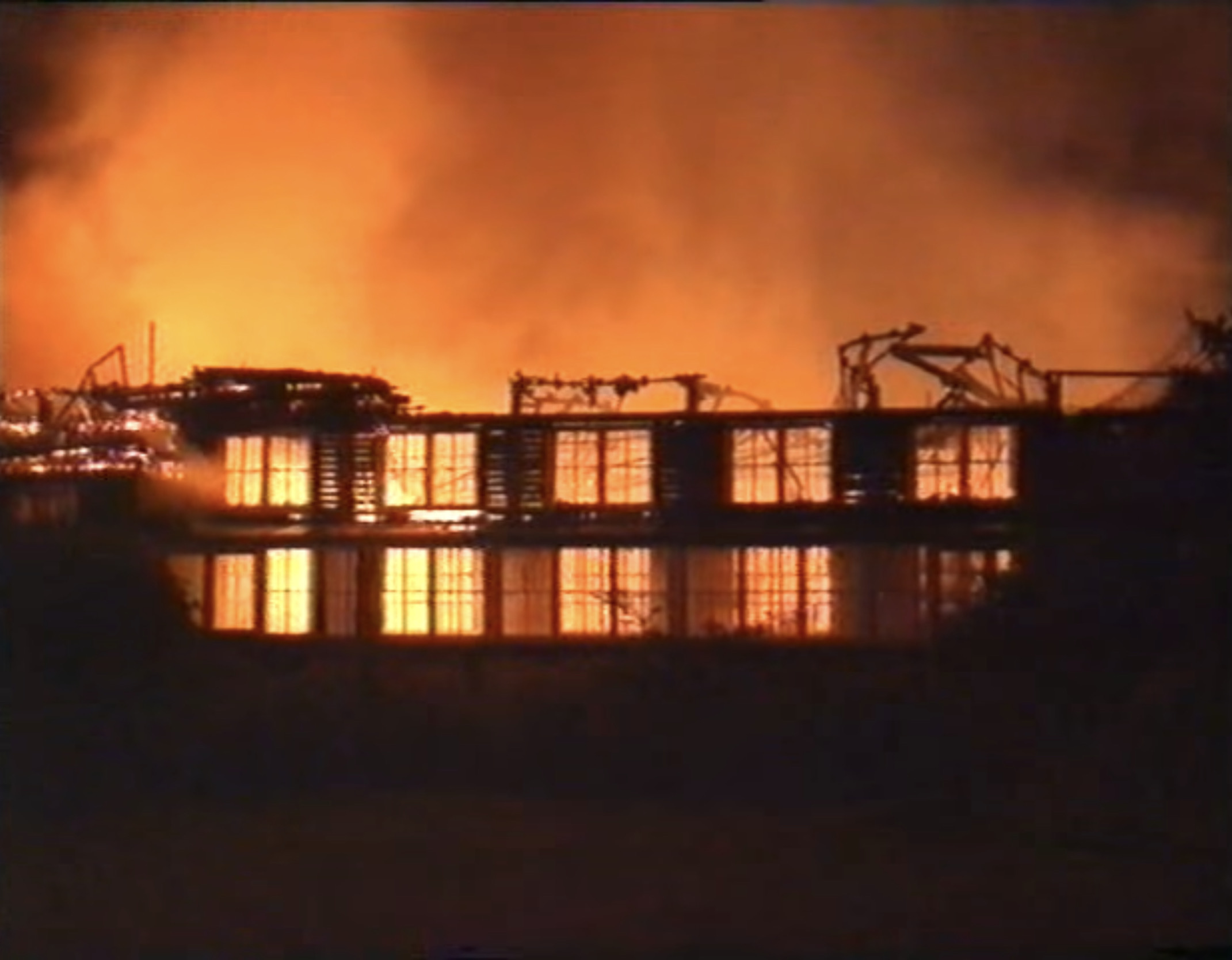
The Lower School Building ablaze on the night of 20 August 1996

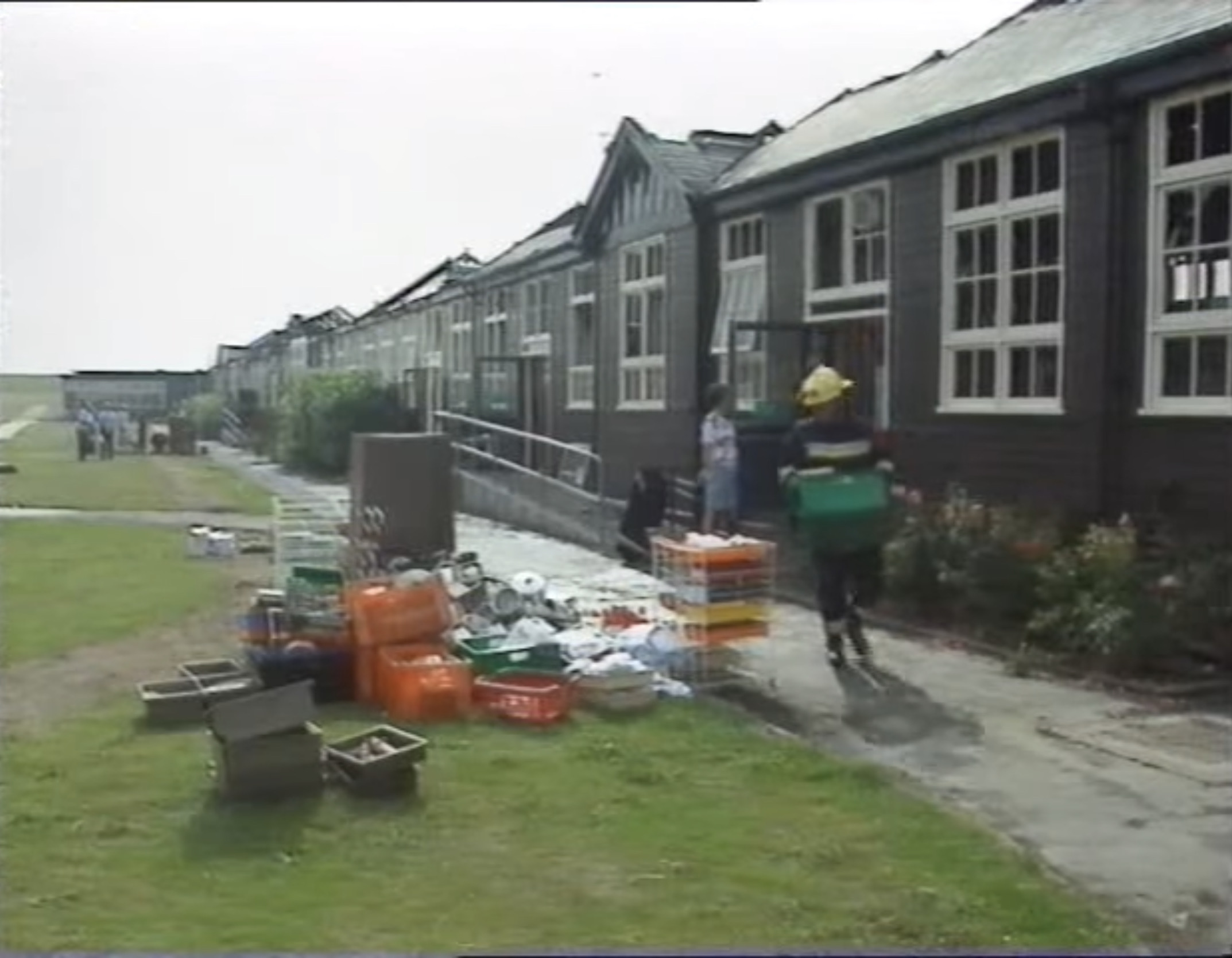
Teachers and firefighters salvaging materials from the burnt-out building

In the late 1900s, Dinnington had a persistent problem with fire, with many students caught playing with fire on school grounds, where many of the original buildings were timber built. On 20 August 1996 the original school building (which still made up close to half of the teaching campus) was set alight by arsonists, with the fire destroying the building. House-bases were re-fitted into classrooms. In 1997 a new brick-built two-storey school building called 'New Build' was opened on the site of the original, which allowed the retirement and demolition of a number of 1960s-built portable classrooms.

On 27 January 2005 the school was designated as a specialist school in Science and Engineering. Previously, in 1993, it had been designated a technology school as part of a previous Department of Education grant scheme.

In 2013, the school took the decision to fence off the extensive playing fields and plateau athletics field towards Throapham, triggering complaints from local residents, who often used the school grounds for exercise and leisurely activities. The school argued that the fencing was necessary to prevent vandalism of the estate, and disruption of school PE classes.

Dinnington became an academy on 1 February 2015, and the school name reverted to Dinnington High School. Initially, the school was part of LEAP Multi Academy Trust with Brinsworth Academy. On 1 April 2024, LEAP merged with New Collaborative Learning Trust, making Dinnington High School part of the enlarged trust.

In 2017 the murder of Dinnington Student, Leonne Weeks, just two minutes away from the school, raised concerns about the security of the school site. Previously the school had been left relatively exposed to the public, with the main gate left open throughout the school day, and no barrier to academic buildings. With the murderer still at large, concerns about student safety forced the school to act quickly. Security officers patrolled the school for a week, whilst temporary fencing was erected. Permanent fencing and three additional access controlled gates were added shortly after.

== School houses ==
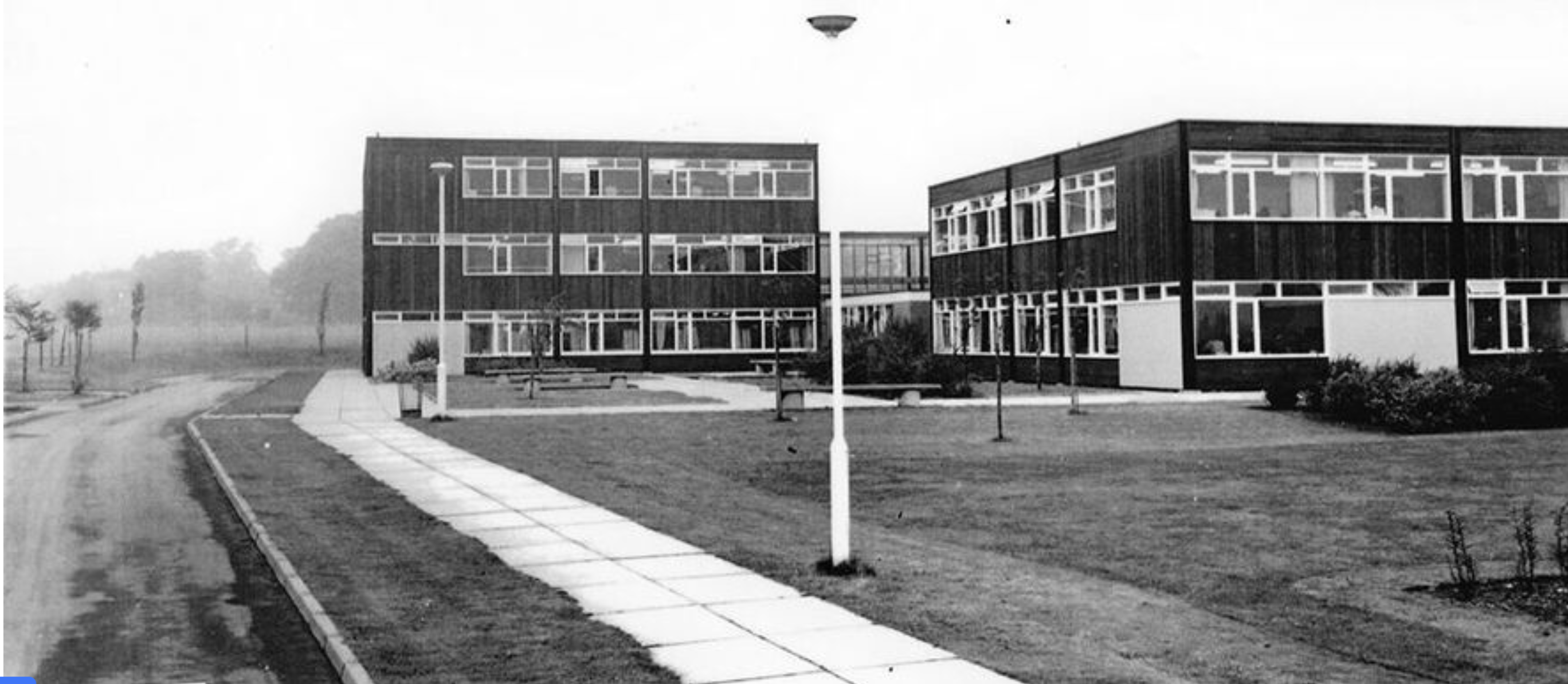
Segrave House in 1967, designed by Sir Basil Urwin Spence

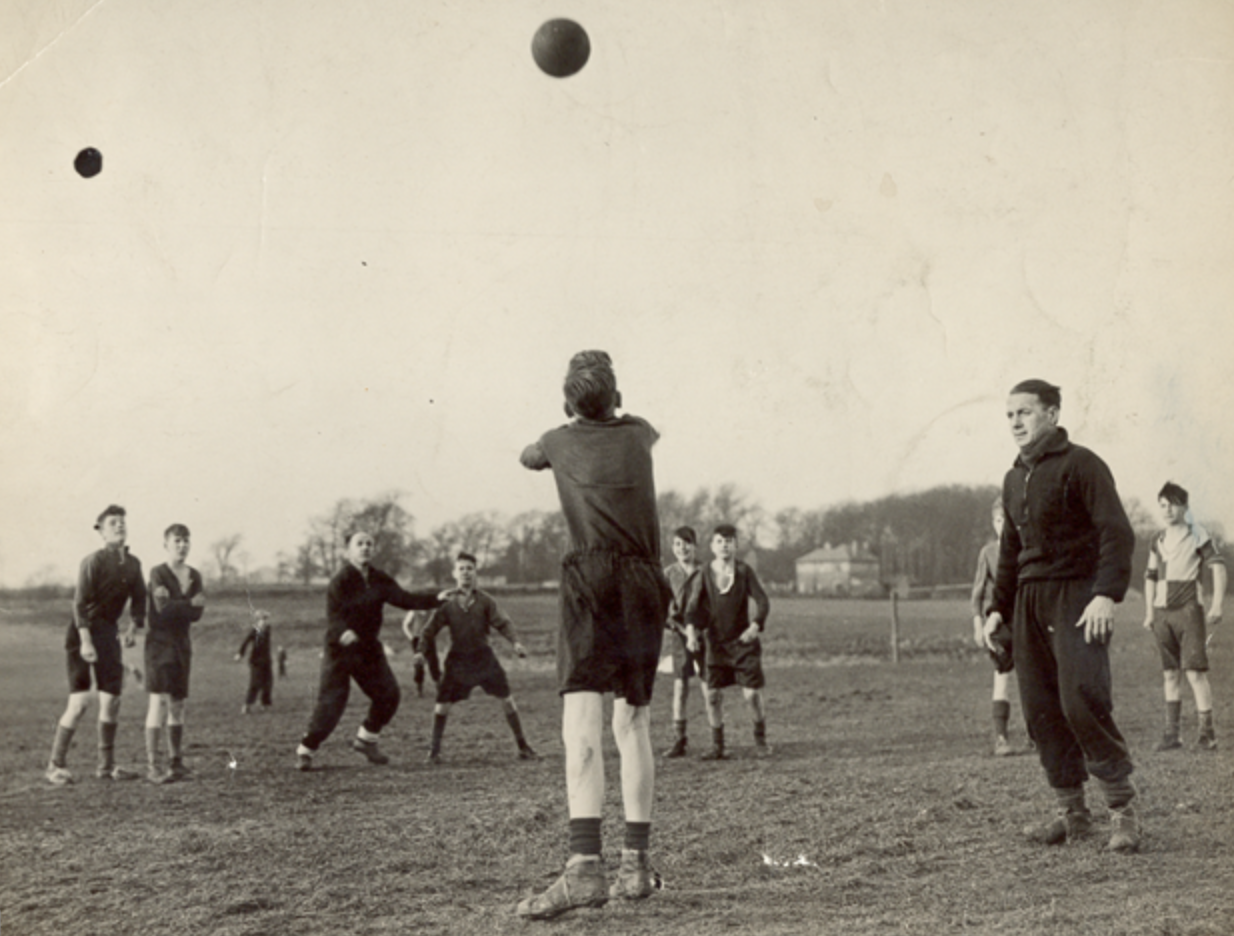
School Playing Fields, 1946

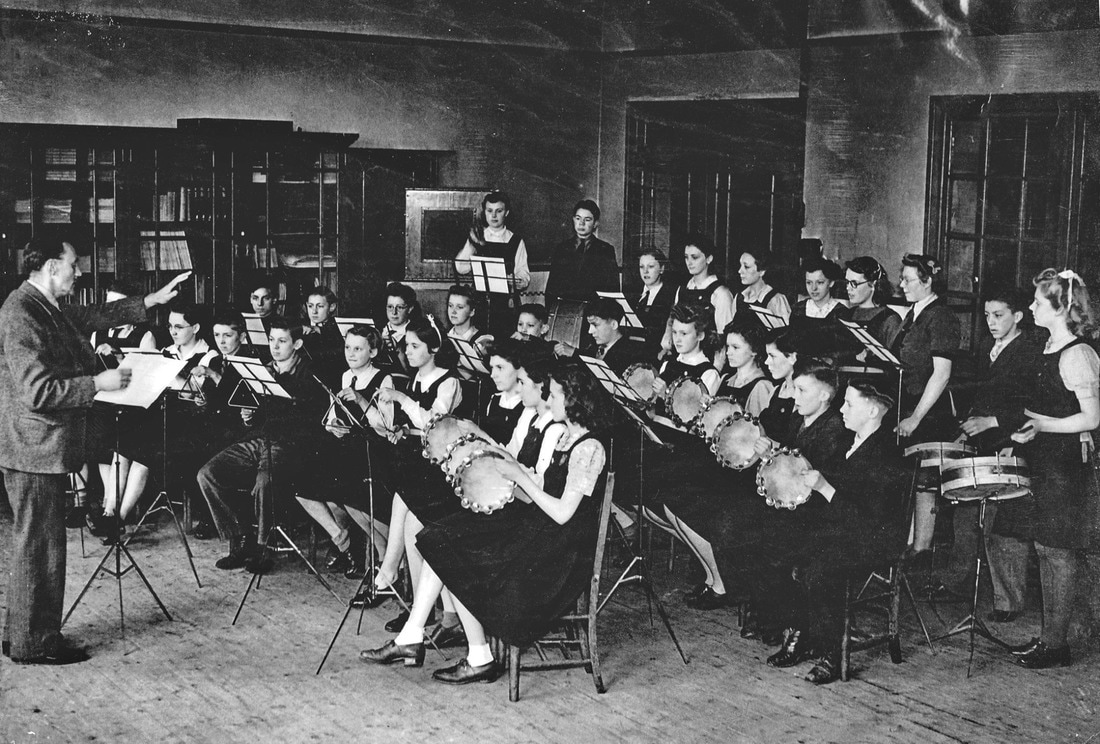
Dinnington High School Orchestra

Dinnington has four school houses each of which took their names and badges from historical local land-owning families:

- Hatfield House, named after land-owners in Laughton-en-le-Morthen in the 17th century.
- Osborne House, named for the family name of the Duke of Leeds who had property in Kiveton Park.
- Segrave House, named after the de Segrave family who owned much of the local area in the 16th century.
- Athorpe House, named after the family who lived at Dinnington Hall in the 17th century.

== In media and popular culture ==
On 14 November 1961, TV journalist James Mossman arrived at Dinnington with a BBC film unit to make a Panorama item on corporal punishment in schools, examining contrasting discipline in two schools in the West Riding; the other being a school in Leeds. There was some follow-up shooting on 29 November. The result, programme 264 of Panorama aired on the BBC on 4 December 1961.

== Ofsted inspections ==
Since the commencement of Ofsted inspections in September 1993, the school has undergone nine full inspections:

Date of inspection	Outcome	Reference
7–?? April 1997	???	
5–9 January 2001	Good	Report
6–7 March 2007	Satisfactory	Report
11–12 November 2009	Satisfactory	Report
23–24 January 2013	Requires improvement	Report
9–10 April 2014	Good	Report
7–8 November 2017	Requires improvement	Report
11–12 February 2020	Requires improvement	Report
22–23 November 2023	Requires improvement	Report

== Headteachers ==
=== Boys' Department ===
- R.J. Pickard, 1935–1946
- E.J. Ducker, 1946–1948
- William G. Davies, 1948–1950
- E.M. Spelman, 1950–1956

=== Girls' Department ===
- G.H. Butterworth, 1935–1942
- Elsie Goldthorpe, 1943–1956 (continued as head of merged school)

=== Mixed school ===
- Elsie Goldthorpe, 1956–1963 (previously head of girls' school)
- J.E.W. Moreton, 1963–1975
- Brian Ingham, 1975–1983
- Gordon Forster, 1983–1997
- Jean Nicholson, 1997–2006 (died in post)
- Sue Carhart, 2006–2007 (acting headteacher)
- Paul Blackwell, 2007–2015
- Chris Eccles and Ian Holborn, 2015–2016
- Rebecca Staples, 2017–2023
- W Barsby, 2023 (acting headteacher)
- Phil Davis, 2024 (acting headteacher)
- Kerry Wade, September 2024–present

== Notable alumni ==
=== Historical figures ===
- Charles Peace, English murderer and fugitive

=== Arts & Culture ===
- Barbara Hofland, 18th century writer
- Martin Webster, BBC executive producer of athletics, 2 time BAFTA winner
- Eliot Kennedy, songwriter and producer for Billie Piper, The Spice Girls and Gary Barlow
- Benjamin Frith, concert pianist

=== Science & Engineering ===
- Hewett Watson, evolutionary theorist & correspondent to Charles Darwin

=== Business & Politics ===
- Ebenezer Rhodes, Master Cutler of Sheffield from 1808
- Samuel Walker, Iron Master and MP for Aldeburgh

=== Sport ===
- Tom Atter, footballer for Rotherham United
- Alan Hodgkinson, footballer for England and Sheffield United
- Mick Jones, footballer for Leeds United
- George Skelton, footballer for Huddersfield Town
- John Naylor, cricketer for Yorkshire CCC
- Austin Morris, footballer for Mansfield Town
- Alan Woods, footballer for Tottenham Hotspur
- Richard Marshall Neal, footballer for Birmingham City
- Paul Arthur Marshall, cricketer
- Walker Wainwright, first-class cricketer
- Jade Moore, footballer for Manchester United Women and The Lionesses
- Walter Boyes, footballer for West Bromwich Albion and England
- Joe Cockcroft, footballer for West Ham United, Sheffield Wednesday and Sheffield United

=== Military ===
- William Henry Johnson, sergeant in 1/5th Battalion, winner of Victoria Cross

== Notable teaching staff ==
- Cec Thompson, professional rugby league footballer (Economics)
- Joe Cockcroft, footballer for West Ham United, Sheffield Wednesday and Sheffield United (PE)
- Rob Rouse, Comedian and Actor, including 8 Out of 10 Cats, and Coronation Street (Geography)
