= Woodsetts =

Village and civil parish in South Yorkshire, England

Coordinates: 53°20′52″N 1°10′21″W

- Village
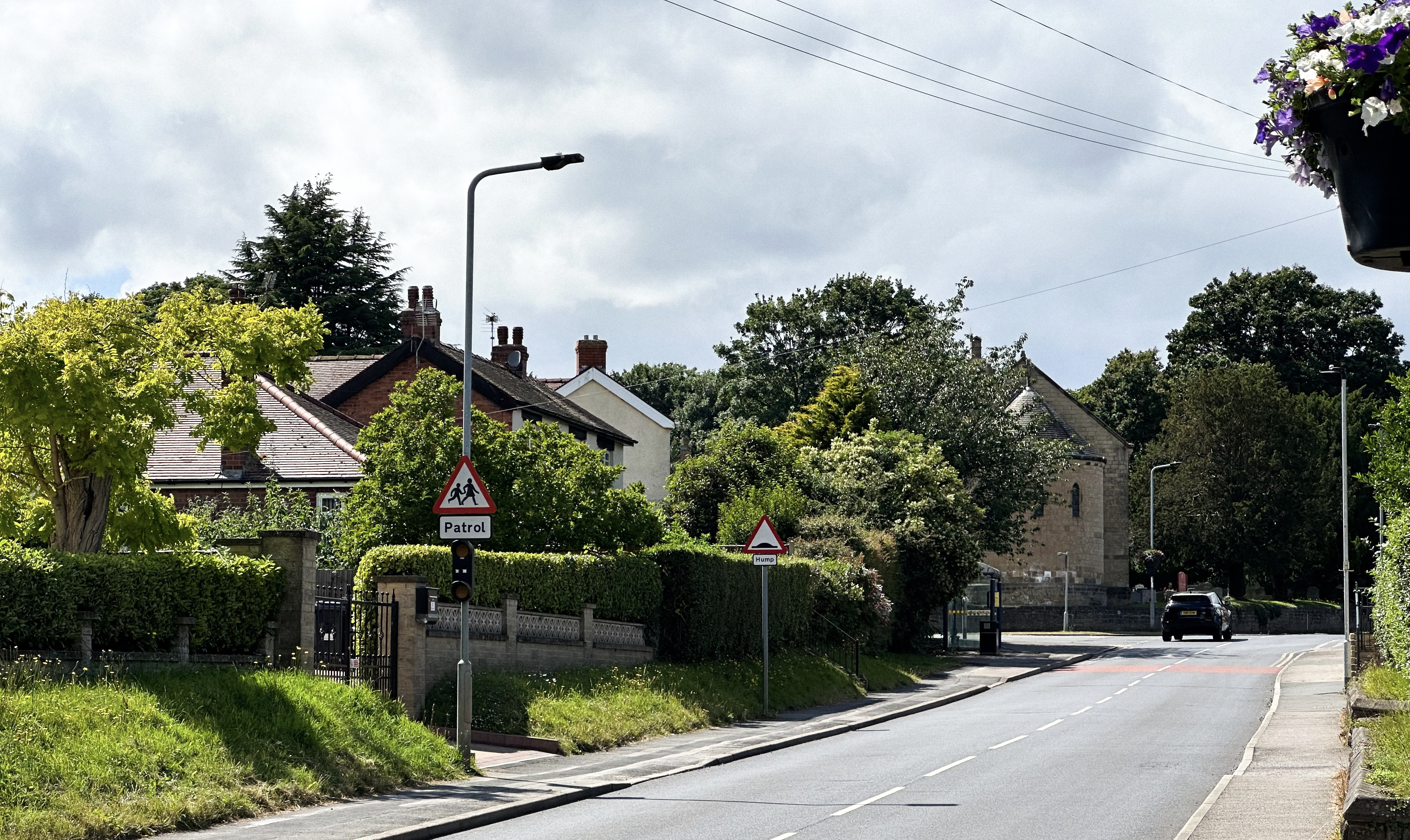
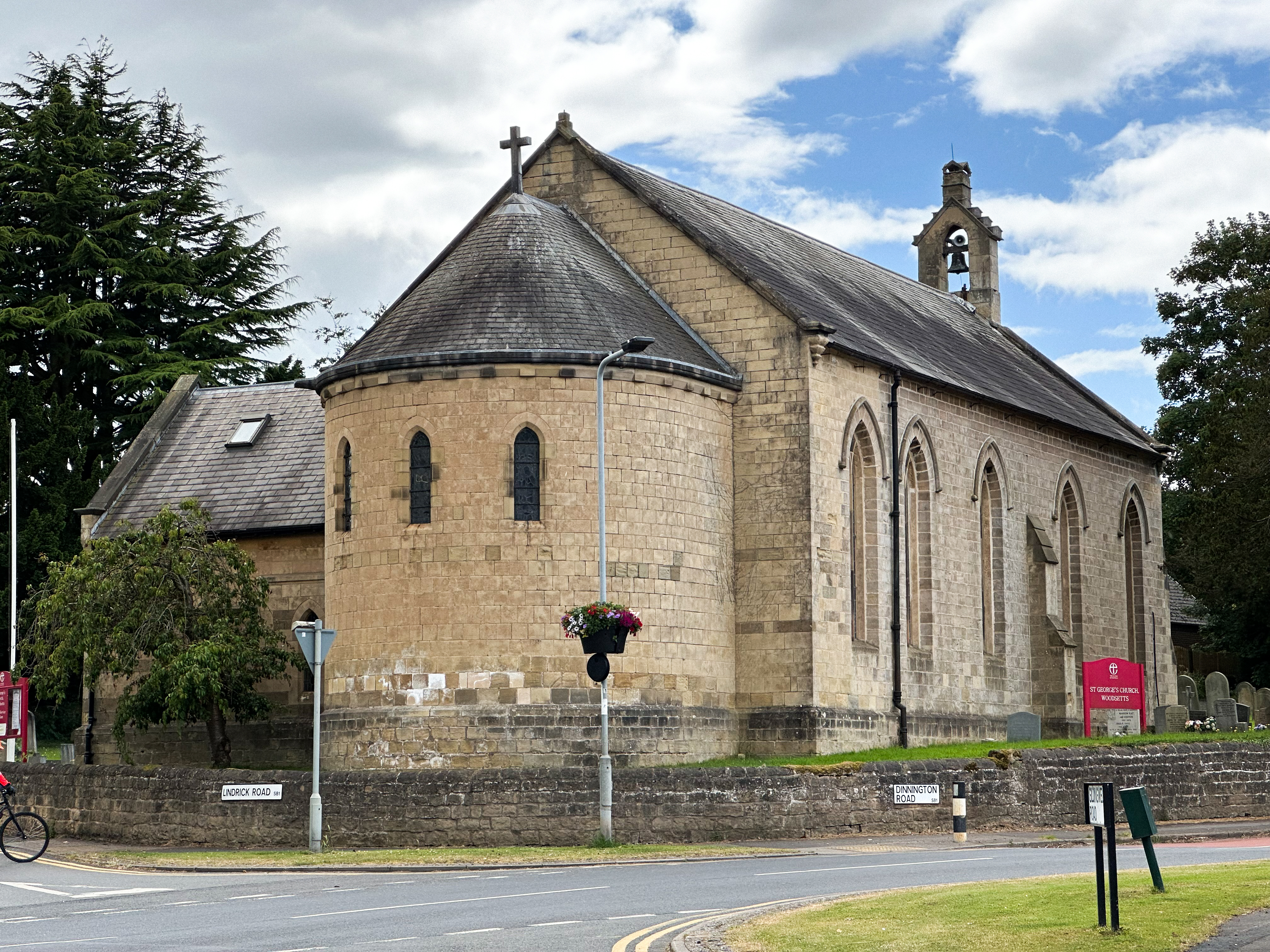
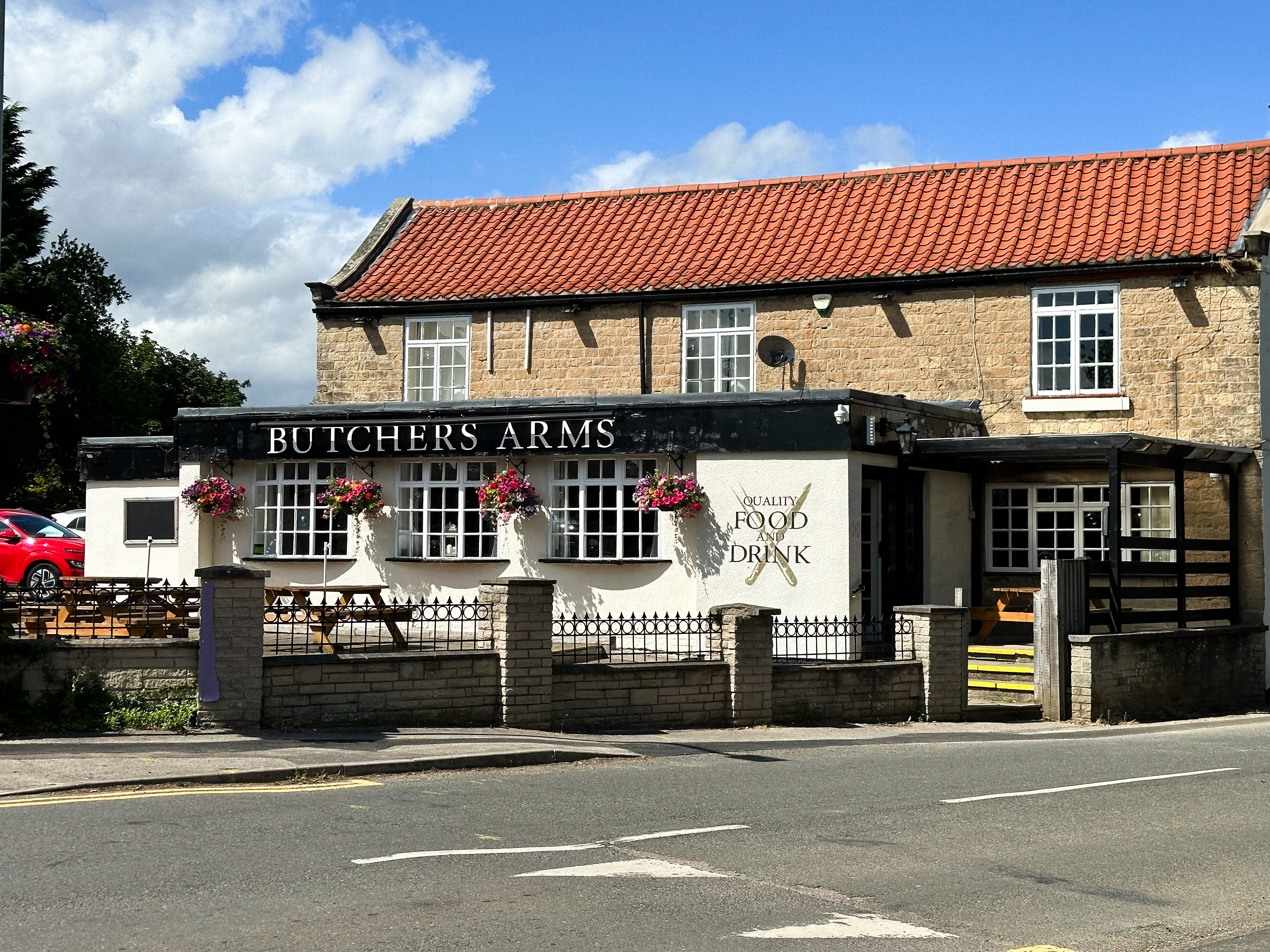
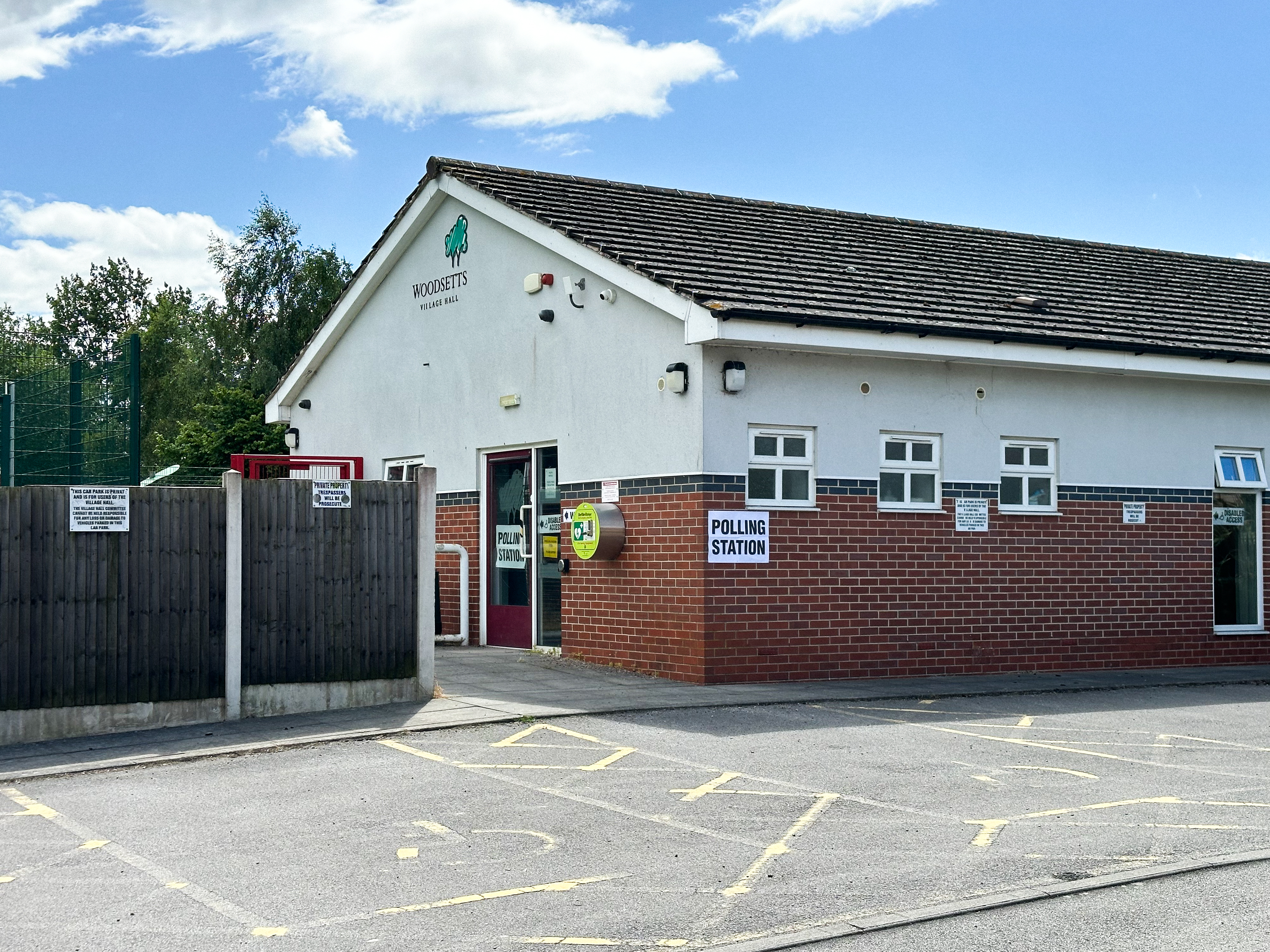
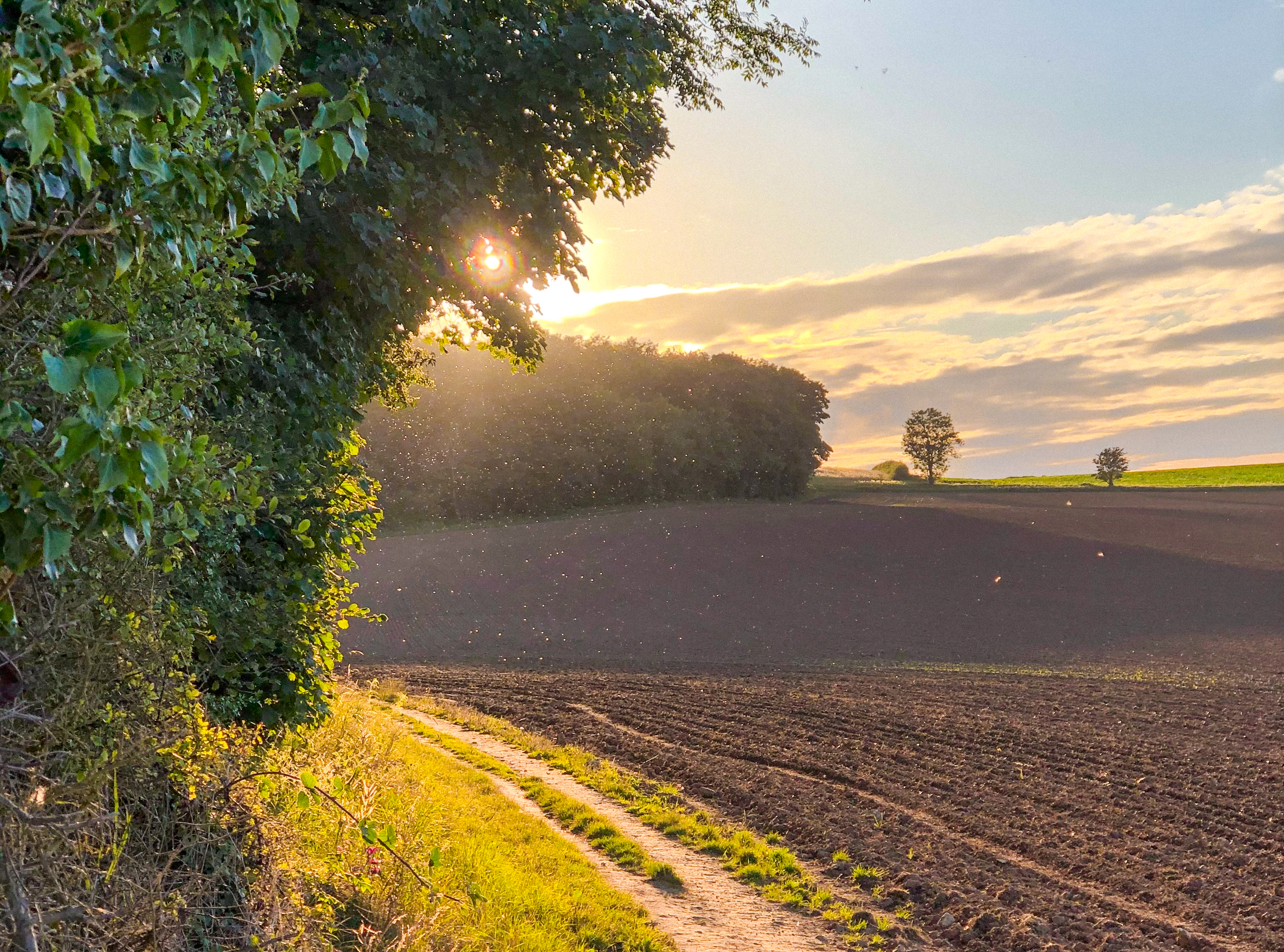
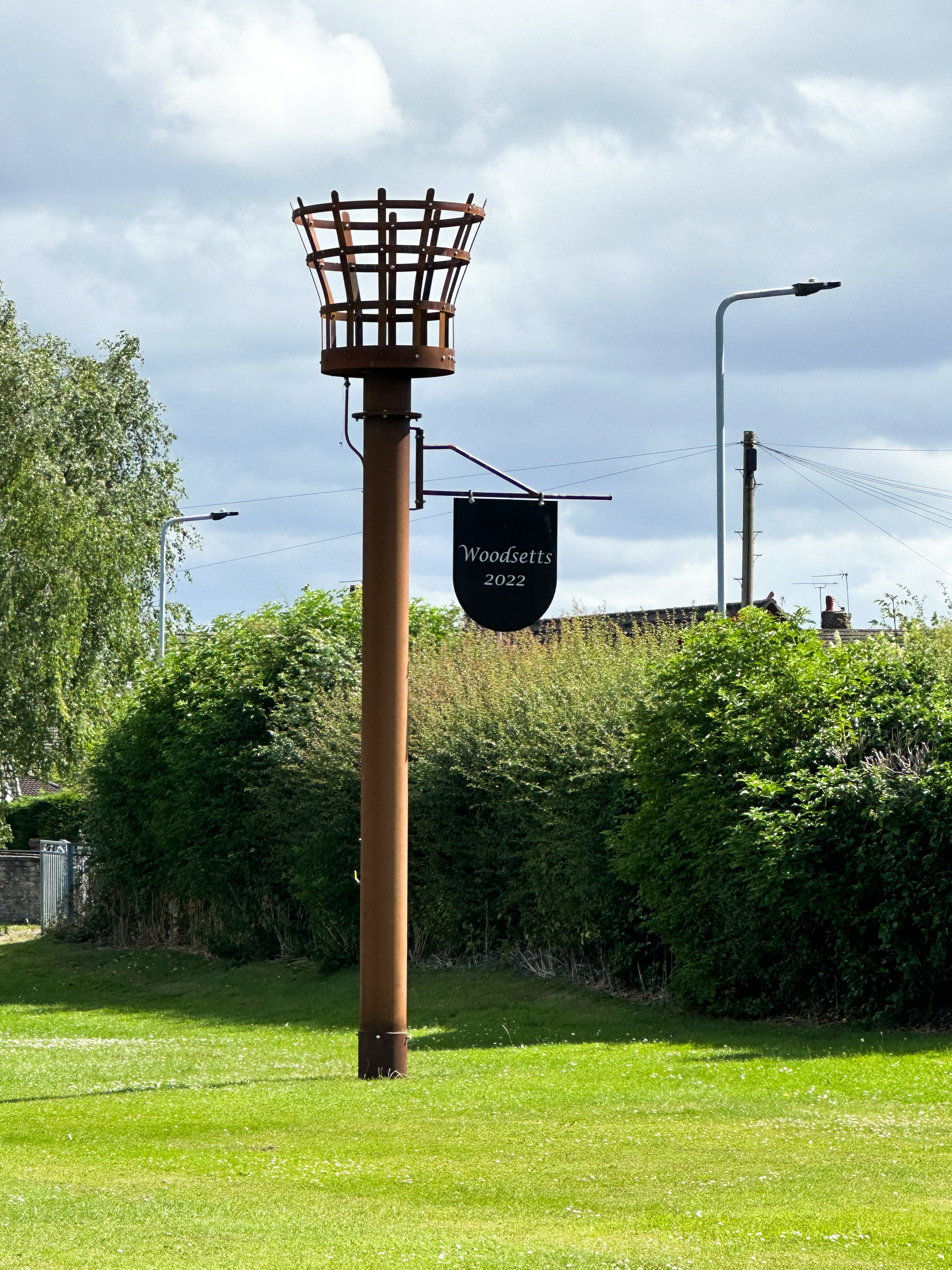
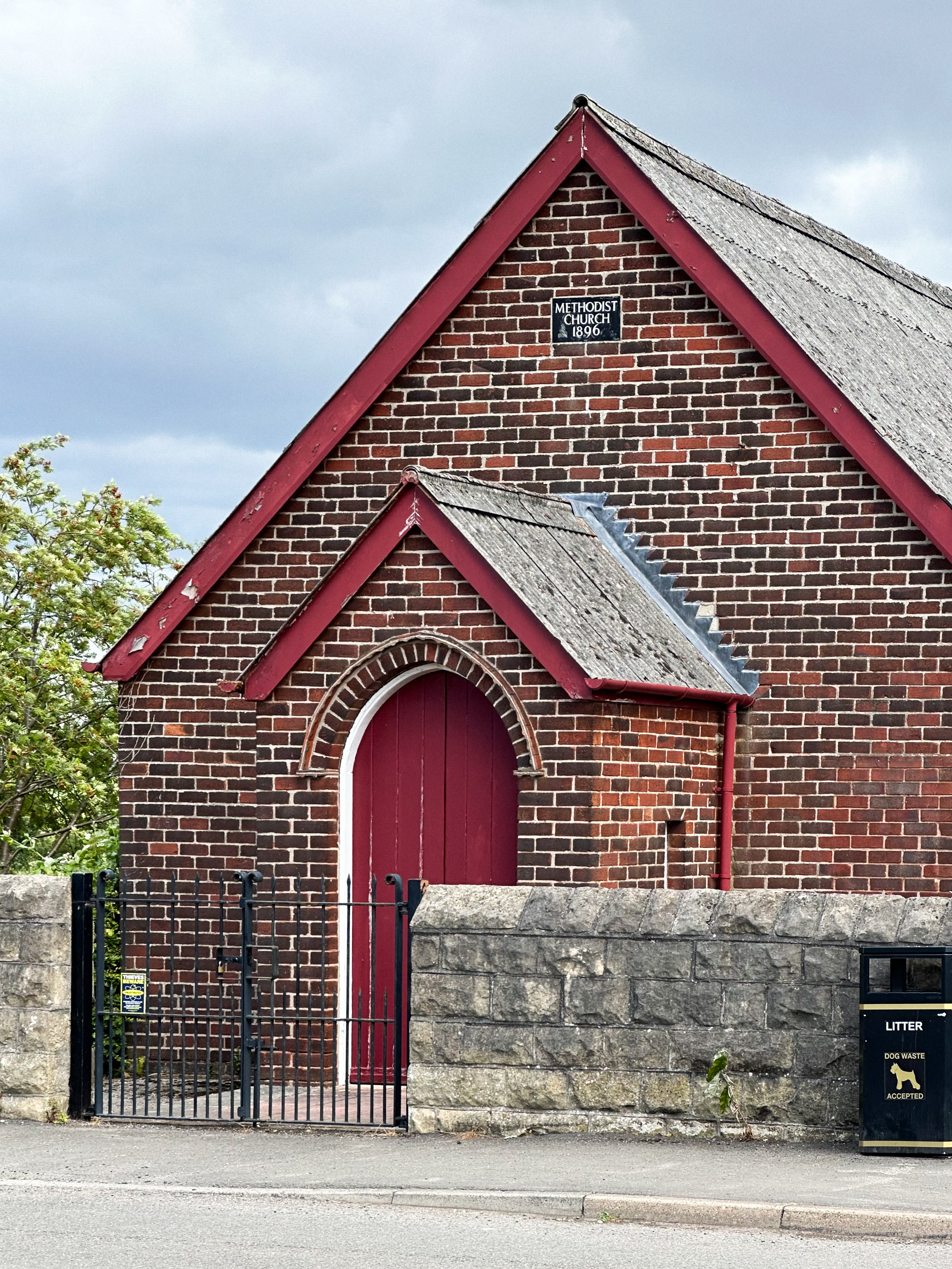
- Village crossroads looking West St George's Church Butchers Arms Village Hall Ancient Woodland Village Beacon Methodist Church

- Location within South Yorkshire
- Population: 1,746 (2011)
- OS grid reference: SK551836
- Civil parish: Woodsetts
- Metropolitan borough: Rotherham
- Metropolitan county: South Yorkshire
- Region: Yorkshire and the Humber
- Country: England
- Sovereign state: United Kingdom
- Post town: WORKSOP
- Postcode district: S81
- Dialling code: 01909
- Police: South Yorkshire
- Fire: South Yorkshire
- Ambulance: Yorkshire
- UK Parliament: Rother Valley

Woodsetts is a village and civil parish in the Metropolitan Borough of Rotherham in South Yorkshire, England, on the border with Nottinghamshire. It lies between the towns of Dinnington and Worksop at an elevation of around 60 metres above sea level, and has a population of 1,746 at the 2011 Census. The village originated as a medieval farming hamlet, the name Woodsetts was first recorded in 1220, but there is evidence of human settlement in the area from 80 BC. The village grew rapidly in the late 19th century when a colliery was sunk at Dinnington. Woodsetts now serves as a commuter base for people working in nearby towns.

== History ==
Woodsetts originated as a medieval hamlet, one of a cluster of hamlets in the area. The name 'Woodsetts' comes from the Middle English word 'Wodesete, meaning an enclosure or fold in the woods. Celtic and Roman coins have been found in the village, indicating human activity in the area since at least 80 BC, although the first written record of Woodsetts was not until the 13th century, when a quitclaim (dated 1220) was produced that mentions a bovate of land 'in the territory of Lyndrick, in Wudsetes'; other nearby geographical references confirm that this refers to Woodsetts, the paper is now held at the Derbyshire Record Office (Hatfield de Rodes papers). The placement of the medieval village was likely due to the source of water in the streams to the North of the village, arable farming land, and the proximity to the historic monasteries of Roche Abbey and Worksop Priory. The nearest established castles were at Laughton-en-le-Morthen, Worksop, and Tickhill.

Woodsetts appeared in a number of medieval and Tudor records. In 1771 the first map of the village was drawn, showing a cluster of buildings around Lindrick Road (originally called 'up the street'). At the turn of the 19th century, the population of Woodsetts was a little over 100. Originally, inhabitants attended the 12th century St James' Church at North Anston; to accommodate the growing population of the village a new church was constructed costing £1,100 (£115,470 in 2024). This church, the Anglican St George's Church, Woodsetts, consists of a modest nave to which an apse was later added, a porch, and a south facing extension; it sits in the Province of York, and the Diocese of Sheffield. The village also has a smaller brick-built church which was constructed in 1896, it was originally a Methodist church, but is now owned by the Plymouth Brethren. In 1871 a vicarage was built for the Anglican church in a redbrick gothic revival style. In 1875, the predecessor to Woodsetts Primary School, was established off Gildingwells Road as 'Woodsetts National School', the school relocated to its present site in 1972. The Butchers Arms is the only public house in the village, built in the 19th century and extended in the 20th century.

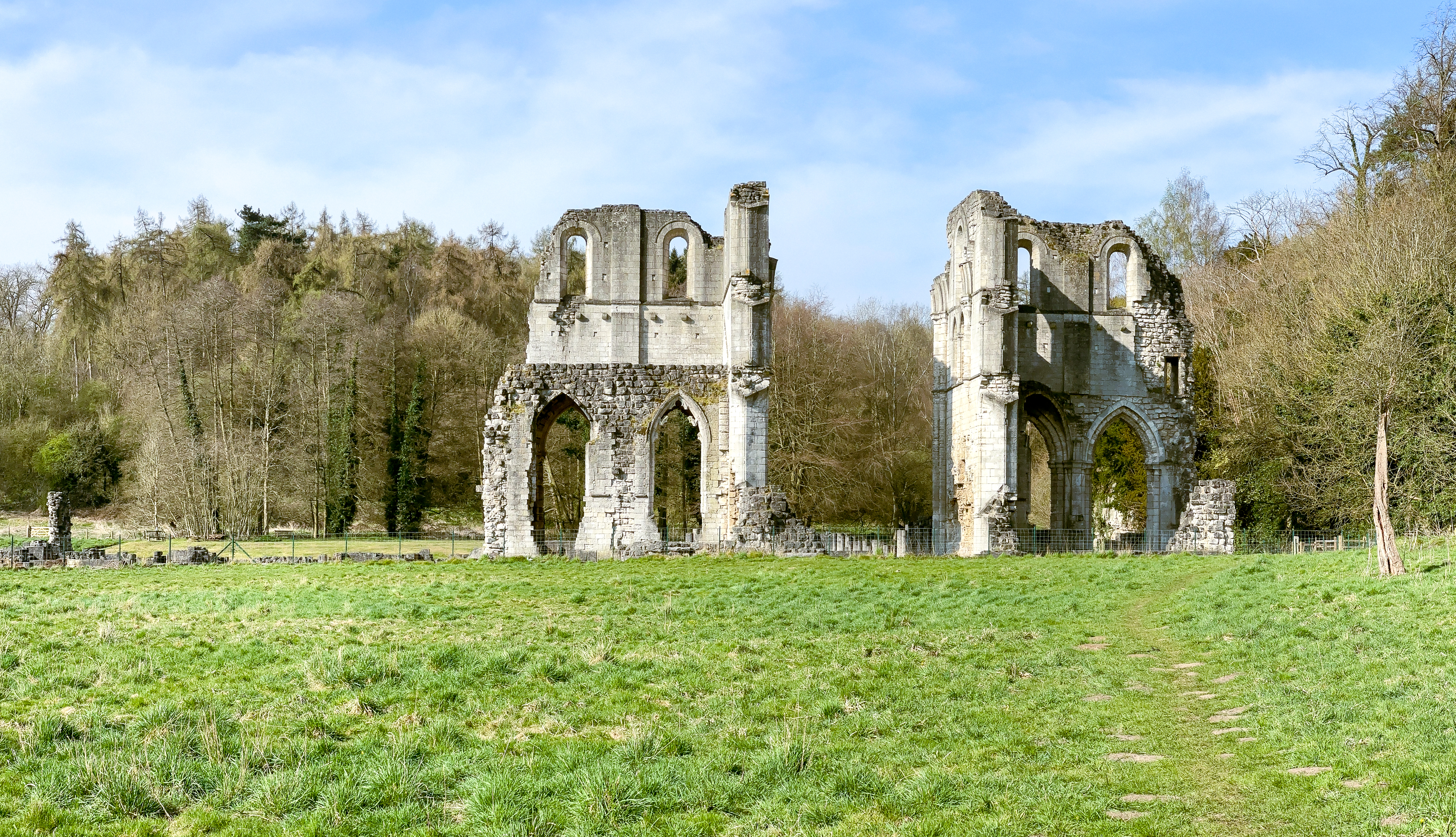
Roche Abbey

Most of the buildings in the village are 20th century built. Some are from the 19th century, and a few date from the 18th century or earlier. Historic England lists three buildings in the village which are of national historical value and significance.

== Traditions ==
=== Beating the bounds ===
The village still holds the centuries-old annual tradition of 'beating the bounds' during Rogationtide, when residents walk around the village led by the vicar in order to define and remember the parish boundary. During the event, the local history society talk about the history of the village.

=== Bonfire night ===
The village holds an annual bonfire night in the start of November. The bonfire is joined by fireworks on the village recreational ground.

== Facilities ==
There is a small shopping precinct in the village, which includes a post office. The new village hall was built in 2007, it sits in the centre of the village off the recreational ground, which includes football pitches, a cricket pitch and green, cricket pavilion, and small skate park. There is also an artificial games pitch, and a children's play area. The village has its own scouts group in the Rotherham district. To the north of the village there is a small GP surgery.

There is one Junior and Infants School in the village. There are two secondary schools within a 4-mile radius, Dinnington High School and Outwood Academy Valley. There is sixth form provision at Dinnington High School, North Notts College, and Worksop College (independent). The nearest Universities are those of Sheffield.

Public transport consists of bus routes operated by stagecoach. The nearest railway station is at Shireoaks.

== Nearby ==
To the north of Woodsetts is the smaller satellite settlement of Gildingwells. Historic places within an 8-mile radius are Roche Abbey (12th century Abbey), Tickhill Castle (12th century Castle), Worksop Priory (13th century Church), and All Saints Church, Steetley (Norman Church). The Tropical Butterfly House Conservation Park is also just outside the village.

The City of Sheffield is the closest major city. The village is about a 10-minute drive from the M1 Motorway.

== Fracking applications ==
Rotherham Borough Council twice refused planning permission for exploration at Woodsetts with regard to shale gas hydraulic fracturing (fracking) in 2018, in March and September. A further public enquiry is to be held in June 2019.

== See also ==
- Listed buildings in Woodsetts
