= Listed buildings in Dinnington St. John's =

Dinnington St. John's is a civil parish in the Metropolitan Borough of Rotherham, South Yorkshire, England. The parish contains nine listed buildings that are recorded in the National Heritage List for England. Of these, one is listed at Grade I, the highest of the three grades, one is at Grade II*, the middle grade, and the others are at Grade II, the lowest grade. The parish contains the town of Dinnington, the hamlet of Throapham, and the surrounding countryside. Most of the listed buildings are houses and associated structures, and the others are a church, and the remains of a medieval cross.

== Key ==
Grade	Criteria
I	Buildings of exceptional interest, sometimes considered to be internationally important
II*	Particularly important buildings of more than special interest
II	Buildings of national importance and special interest

== Buildings ==
Name and location	Photograph	Date	Notes	Grade
St John's Church, Throapham; 53.38244°N 1.21489°W		12th century	The church, now redundant, has been altered and extended through the centuries, the tower dates from the 15th century, the chancel and porch were rebuilt in 1709, and the church was restored in the 19th century. It is built in limestone, the roofs of the aisles are in slate, and elsewhere they are in stainless steel. The church consists of a nave with north and south aisles, a south porch, a chancel, and a west tower. The tower is in Perpendicular style, and has three stages, diagonal buttresses, a west door, a three-light west window, and an embattled parapet with gargoyles.	I
Remains of cross 53.36685°N 1.21166°W		Late medieval (probable)	The remains of the cross are in an enclosure, and are in stone. The base is about 0.75 metres (2 ft 6 in) square with a rounded top edge. The shaft is tapered and chamfered, it is over 2 metres (6 ft 7 in) high, and the top is broken.	II
Hall Farmhouse and farmbuildings 53.36709°N 1.21132°W	—	Early 17th century	The farmhouse and farm buildings are in limestone on plinths, and have roofs of pantile and Welsh slate with coped gables and shaped kneelers. There are two storeys and attics, and an L-shaped plan, with six bays along the roadside, and a gabled cross-wing on the left extending to the rear. The gabled bay has quoins and mullioned windows, and the roadside range contains a wagon entrance with a quoined surround and casement windows.	II
Dinnington Hall; 53.36542°N 1.21260°W		Early to mid 18th century	The house, which incorporates earlier material, was later altered and extended, and has been converted into a hotel. It is in sandstone on a plinth, with string courses, an eaves cornice, a parapet with ball finials, and a roof of tile and Westmorland slate. There are two storeys and attics, and a symmetrical front of five bays. In the centre is a porch, and a doorway with pilasters, an entablature and a triple keystone. Above the doorway is a sash window in an architrave with a keystone surmounted by a carved bird. The porch is flanked by two-storey canted bay windows. The outer bays each has a rusticated ground floor, with a round-arched sash window flanked by square-headed niches. In the upper floor is a round-arched recess containing a flat-headed sash window with an architrave and a cornice flanked by semi-domed niches, and above is an open pediment and a hipped roof. At the rear are three round-headed dormers.	II*
4 Laughton Road; 53.36655°N 1.21205°W	—	Mid 18th century	The house is in limestone with quoins, stone slate eaves courses, and a Welsh slate roof with square-cut gable copings and shaped kneelers. There are two storeys and an attic, a front of three bays, and a lower rear wing. The doorway has a chamfered quoined surround and a bracketed hood. The windows in the ground floor are casements, in the upper floor they are sashes, and in the rear wing is a dormer.	II
1 St Leonard's Court and wall 53.36586°N 1.21212°W	—	Late 18th century	The former stable block to Dinnington Hall, later used for other purposes, is in limestone with a hipped tile roof with some slate. There is a U-shaped plan with three ranges and a wall surrounding a courtyard. The main range has seven bays, the centre bay with three storeys, containing a round-arched carriage entrance with a quoined surround and an impost band. It is flanked by two-story three-bay wings, the outer bays with a floor band and an eaves band, and containing a blocked round-arched doorway and an oculus above, and the bays between have casement windows on the ground floor and sash windows above. The rear wings link with the stone coped wall that contains gate piers with sunken panels and cornices, and a blocked doorway with ball finials.	II
Limelands; 53.36918°N 1.21780°W	—	Late 18th century	A limestone house, with quoins, and a pantile roof with coped gables and shaped kneelers. There are two storeys, four bays, and a continuous rear outshut. On the front is a doorway and sash windows, some of which are horizontally-sliding. On the rear return are ledges and blocked openings to a pigeon loft.	II
Throapham House; 53.37876°N 1.20522°W		Late 18th century (probable)	The house is in limestone on a plinth, with chamfered quoins, a floor band, an eaves band, and a hipped Welsh slate roof. There are two storeys, with an L-shaped plan, consisting of a front range of four bays, a rear wing on the left, and a later parallel range projecting to the right. The doorway has an architrave, a fanlight, and a pediment on consoles, and the windows have architraves.	II
Gate piers and wall, Throapham House; 53.37866°N 1.20523°W	—	Late 18th century (probable)	The gate piers and wall in front of the house are in limestone. The piers are square, and each pier has a plinth, a monolithic shaft, a cornice, and a ball finial. The wall has slab coping, it steps down by the gate piers, and up again on the left.	II
