= Paul Marshall =

Paul Marshall may refer to:

- Paul Marshall (cricketer) (born 1949), English cricketer
- Paul Marshall (investor) (born 1959), British investor and media owner
- Paul Marshall (swimmer) (1961–2009), British swimmer
- Paul Marshall (footballer) (born 1989), English footballer
- Paul Marshall (rugby union) (born 1985), Irish rugby union footballer
- Paul Marshall (ice hockey, born 1960), Canadian ice hockey left-winger
- Paul Marshall (ice hockey, born 1966), American ice hockey player
- Paul G. Marshall (1928–2012), American entertainment lawyer
- Paul V. Marshall (born 1947), American bishop of the Episcopal Diocese of Bethlehem
- Paul Marshall (comics), British comics artist, see List of minor 2000 AD stories

== See also ==
- Paula Marshall (born 1964), American actress
- Paule Marshall (1929–2019), American novelist
