= Listed buildings in Woodsetts =

Woodsetts, is a civil parish in the Metropolitan Borough of Rotherham, South Yorkshire, England. The parish contains three listed buildings that are recorded in the National Heritage List for England. All the listed buildings are designated at Grade II, the lowest of the three grades, which is applied to "buildings of national importance and special interest". The parish contains the village of Woodsetts and the surrounding area, and the listed buildings consist of two houses and a farmhouse.

== Buildings ==
Name and location	Photograph	Date	Notes
Hoades Farmhouse; 53.34919°N 1.17730°W	—	Late 18th century	The farmhouse is in limestone, and has a pantile roof with coped gables and shaped kneelers. There are two storeys and attics, and three bays. On the front is a gabled porch, and the windows are casements.
Lindrick House; 53.34072°N 1.18163°W	—	Early 19th century	A limestone house with a sill band, an eaves band, and a pantile roof. There are three storeys and three bays. In the centre is a French window, the other windows are casements, and the central window in the middle floor has a balcony with iron railings.
Woodsetts House; 53.34763°N 1.17470°W	—	c. 1870	The house is in dark red brick with blue brick bands, on a plinth, it has a Welsh slate roof with crested tiles, and is in High Victorian style. There are two storeys and attics, and four bays. The second and fourth bays are gabled, and in the third bay is a doorway with a pointed arch and a hood mould. In the left bay is a caned bay window with a dentilled course and a hipped roof. Most of the windows are sashes, some with mullions, and some with chamfered lintels.
