= St George's Church, Woodsetts =

Parish Church in South Yorkshire, England

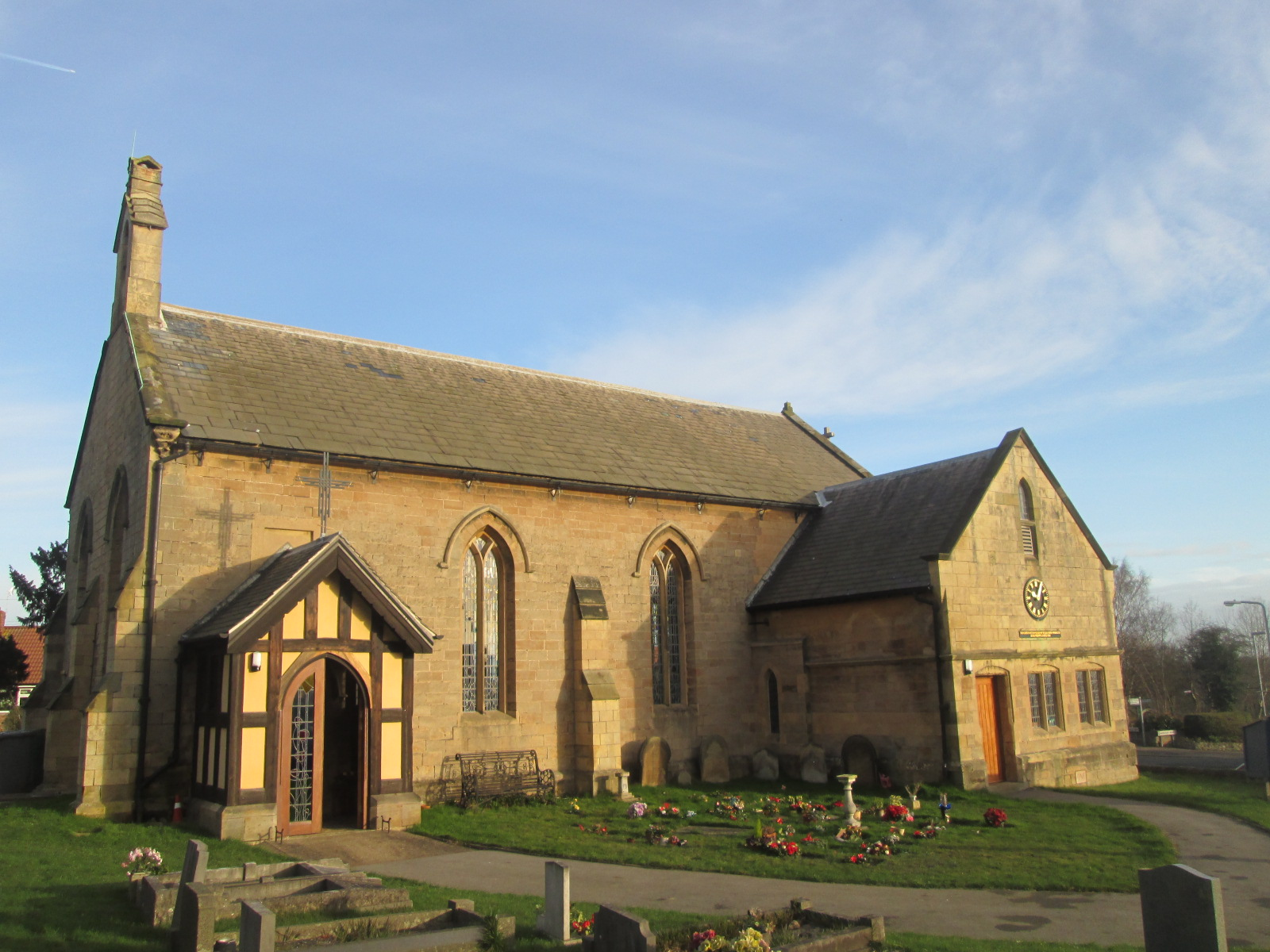
- St George's Church
- St George's Church, Woodsetts
- 53°20′52″N 1°10′22″W
- OS grid reference: SK 55167 83741
- Location: Woodsetts, South Yorkshire
- Country: England
- Denomination: Church of England

History
- Dedication: St. George

Architecture
- Style: Gothic Revival
- Completed: 1842

Administration
- Diocese: Sheffield
- Deanery: Laughton

Clergy
- Vicar: Interregnum

St George's Church, Woodsetts is a Church of England parish church in Woodsetts, South Yorkshire, England. The church is located on Lindrick Road, and overlooks the village crossroads. The earliest part of the building was completed in 1842, and was extended in 1923. It sits within the Diocese of Sheffield, and the Province of York.

== History ==
By the late 19th century, the population of Woodsetts was deemed large and stable enough to warrant a church of its own. Before this time, villagers would travel to St James Church at Anston. A subscription was started in the village, and raised a total of £1,100. Land for the church was purchased from the Duke of Leeds, and building started in 1840, to a design by Hurst and Moffatt. The building was consecrated in September 1841. The work cost £1,100, and on completion the church had seating for 188 worshippers. On Sunday 30 March 1851, it held two services, with attendances of 64 and 72.

The building was originally of a single cell, the footprint of which is the present nave, and first dedicated to St Mary. In 1923 the church was extended by A. E. Turnell to include a choir, an apse, and a vestry. A porch was added as a World War I memorial. The bellcote has a single bell, originally cast in 1841 at Whitechapel, and recast in 1976 at Loughborough. In 1970, new light fittings were installed, designed by George Pace.

== Architecture ==
The building is of three cells. Withstanding the porch, the entire church is of local limestone and slate roof. The nave is of an austere early English style, with Y-tracery windows and basic hood-moulds. Sharing the nave's cell is an elevated choir and organ. At the east end of the church is an apse with three lancet windows. To the south east of the church is a vestry, with mullion and lancet windows. The exterior of the vestry gable has a clock. Ascending from the west wall of the nave is a bell-cote. The porch is of a mock-tutor style, with timber frame. The east windows have stained glass, designed by Kempe & Co in 1924.
