= John Naylor (cricketer) =

English cricketer

John Edward Naylor (11 December 1930 – 26 June 1996) was an English first-class cricketer, who played one match for Yorkshire County Cricket Club in 1953, a year when he also appeared for the Second XI.

Born in Thurcroft, near Rotherham, Yorkshire, England, Naylor's only game was against Somerset at Headingley in the County Championship. He bowled 35 overs for 84 runs in the first innings, and seven more overs for four runs in the second, with his slow left arm orthodox spin. He failed to take a wicket, although he did catch David Kitson off the bowling of Harry Halliday for 15.

Naylor died in June 1996, in Bramhall, Stockport, Greater Manchester.
