= Brinsworth Academy =

Location
- Brinsworth Road; Rotherham, South Yorkshire, S60 5EJ; England
- 53°24′11″N 1°22′41″W

Information
- Type: Academy
- Motto: Achieving Excellence
- Local authority: Rotherham
- Trust: New Collaborative Learning Trust
- Department for Education URN: 136301 Tables
- Ofsted: Reports
- Chair of Governors: A Buckley
- Principal: Hannah Thornton
- Gender: Coeducational
- Age: 11 to 18
- Enrolment: 1,349
- Capacity: 1,487
- Former name: Brinsworth Comprehensive School (until 2015)
- Website: https://www.brinsworthacademy.org.uk/

Brinsworth Academy (formerly Brinsworth Comprehensive School) is a mixed secondary school and sixth form located in Brinsworth, South Yorkshire, England.

== History ==
As Brinsworth Comprehensive School it was previously awarded specialist Science College status. The school became an academy in October 2010. It changed its name from Brinsworth Comprehensive School to Brinsworth Academy on 1 September 2015. Initially, the school was part of LEAP Multi Academy Trust with Dinnington High School. On 1 April 2024, LEAP merged with New Collaborative Learning Trust, making Brinsworth Academy part of the enlarged trust.

== Ofsted inspections ==
Since the commencement of Ofsted inspections in September 1993, the school has undergone six inspections:

Date of inspection	Outcome	Reference
27 September – 1 October 1993	???	
23–27 February 1998	Satisfactory	Report
17–21 November 2003	Good	Report
11 December 2007	Outstanding	Report
13–14 June 2012	Good	Report
21 March 2017	Good	Report
2 and 3 February 2022	Good	Report

== Headteachers ==
- Mr Richard Fone, 2008 – December 2015
- Mr Barsby and Mr Riches (co-headteachers), January 2016 – September 2020
- Mr Raynor, September 2020 – 2025
- Mrs Thornton is current head, 2025-current

== Notable pupils ==
- Howard Webb, football referee who officiated the 2010 FIFA World Cup Final
- Rory McArdle, professional footballer for Sheffield Wednesday, Aberdeen, Bradford City, Scunthorpe United, Exeter City and Harrogate Town
