= Benjamin Frith =

British pianist

Benjamin Frith (born 11 October 1957) is a British classical pianist.

== Early life and education ==
Frith was born in South Yorkshire, England, on 11 October 1957. He began taking piano lessons with Dame Fanny Waterman at the age of ten. He was encouraged by Waterman to pursue a career after winning the Dudley National Piano Competition in 1972, at age 14. Following Frith's Dudley win, Sir Peter Pears asked him to play at the Aldeburgh Festival.

Frith was educated at Dinnington High School and read Music at the University of Leeds, graduating with a BA in 1979.

== Career ==
After graduation, Frith studied again under Fanny Waterman and won several awards early in his career, including the gold medal at the 1989 Arthur Rubinstein Piano Competition in Israel. He has appeared with many of the world's finest orchestras including the Berlin Symphony, Israel Philharmonic, City of Birmingham Symphony, Polish National Radio, and the BBC Philharmonic. He has worked with many leading conductors such as Zubin Mehta, Antoni Wit, Vasary, Skrowaczewski, Bamert, Atzman and Barry Wordsworth.

His repertoire ranges from Bach to Tippett and includes over 50 concertos. He has recorded all the John Field piano concertos (during 2002, numbers 5 & 6 reached the top of the classical charts) and since then has recorded all of Field's nocturnes for solo piano. His disc of Schumann’s Davidsbündlertänze was chosen as the top recommendation on the Radio 3 “Building a Library” programme. Five of his discs are represented in the Gramophone – Best CD Guide and in response to his recording of the Beethoven Diabelli Variations, Gramophone critic Richard Osborne wrote, “he possesses a formidable talent both musically and technically. Indeed, I would go as far as to suggest that there has not been a finer Diabelli on record by a young pianist since the classic recording by the twenty eight year old Stephen Kovacevich in 1968”. A recent recording of a selection of Scarlatti Sonatas was described in the BBC Music Magazine as follows: “Benjamin Frith is an inspired choice for the fifth disc of the Naxos cycle; a compelling advocate of the piano, he transports the music to the new medium, capitalising on the piano’s ability to pick out a strand, shape dynamics and bathe textures in subtle pedalling, without ever misrepresenting Scarlatti – a disc to convert the most die-hard authenticist”.

Frith is a member of the Gould Piano Trio and is a Professor of Piano at the Royal Northern College of Music in Manchester. He also teaches at the Royal Welsh College of Music and Drama in Cardiff where he is an Honorary Fellow.

== Personal life ==
Frith's partner is pianist Heidi Rolfe. The couple perform together.
