= St John's Church, Throapham =

Coordinates: 53.3824°N 1.2149°W

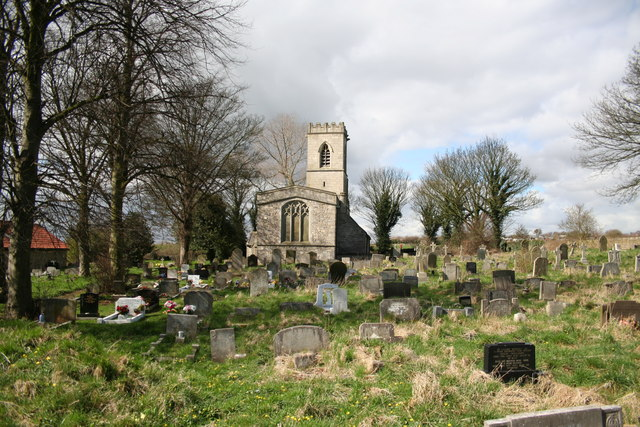
- St John's Church, Throapham, from the east

- Location in South Yorkshire
- OS grid reference: SK 523 875
- Location: Throapham, South Yorkshire
- Country: England
- Denomination: Anglican
- Website: Churches Conservation Trust

History
- Dedication: Saint John the Baptist

Architecture
- Functional status: Redundant
- Heritage designation: Grade I
- Designated: 15 October 1986
- Architectural type: Church
- Style: Gothic

Specifications
- Materials: Limestone, stainless steel and slate roofs

St John's Church is a redundant Anglican church near the village of Throapham, on the road between Dinnington and Laughton-en-le-Morthen, South Yorkshire, England. It is recorded in the National Heritage List for England as a designated Grade I listed building, and is under the care of the Churches Conservation Trust.

== History ==
The church stands on the site of at least one Celtic well, and some of its fabric dates from the Anglo-Saxon period. Much of the church dates from the 12th century. The fabric of the nave dates from several phases of building during the medieval period. The tower was added in the 15th century, while in 1709 the chancel and porch were rebuilt. Restoration was carried out in the 19th century. St John's was vested in the Trust on 1 May 1985.

== Architecture ==
=== Structure ===
St John's is constructed in ashlar limestone; the main roofs are of stainless steel, while the aisles have slate roofs. Its plan consists of a three-bay nave with a clerestory, north and south aisles and a south porch, a two-bay chancel, and a west tower. The tower is in Perpendicular style and has three stages. At its west end are diagonal buttresses, a blocked west door and a three-light window. There are string courses between the stages. In the top stage are two-light bell openings, and the top of the tower has an embattled parapet with gargoyles on the north side. The arcades between the nave and the aisles date from about 1200.

=== Furniture and fittings ===
The octagonal font is in Perpendicular style. It is carved with traceried panels and has a castellated top. Also on the font are carvings depicting faces from the three continents that were known at the time of its carving. Also in the church is a carved stone coffin lid dating from about 1300. This is in two pieces and is carved with foliage in high relief. It is described as being "remarkable", and as a "great treasure".

== Present day ==
The management of the church is assisted by a local group of volunteers, the Friends of Throapham Church. The church is kept locked, but is opened for visitors upon advance request.

== See also ==
- Grade I listed buildings in South Yorkshire
- List of churches preserved by the Churches Conservation Trust in Northern England
