= Howard Webb =

English football referee (born 1971)

Howard Webb MBE
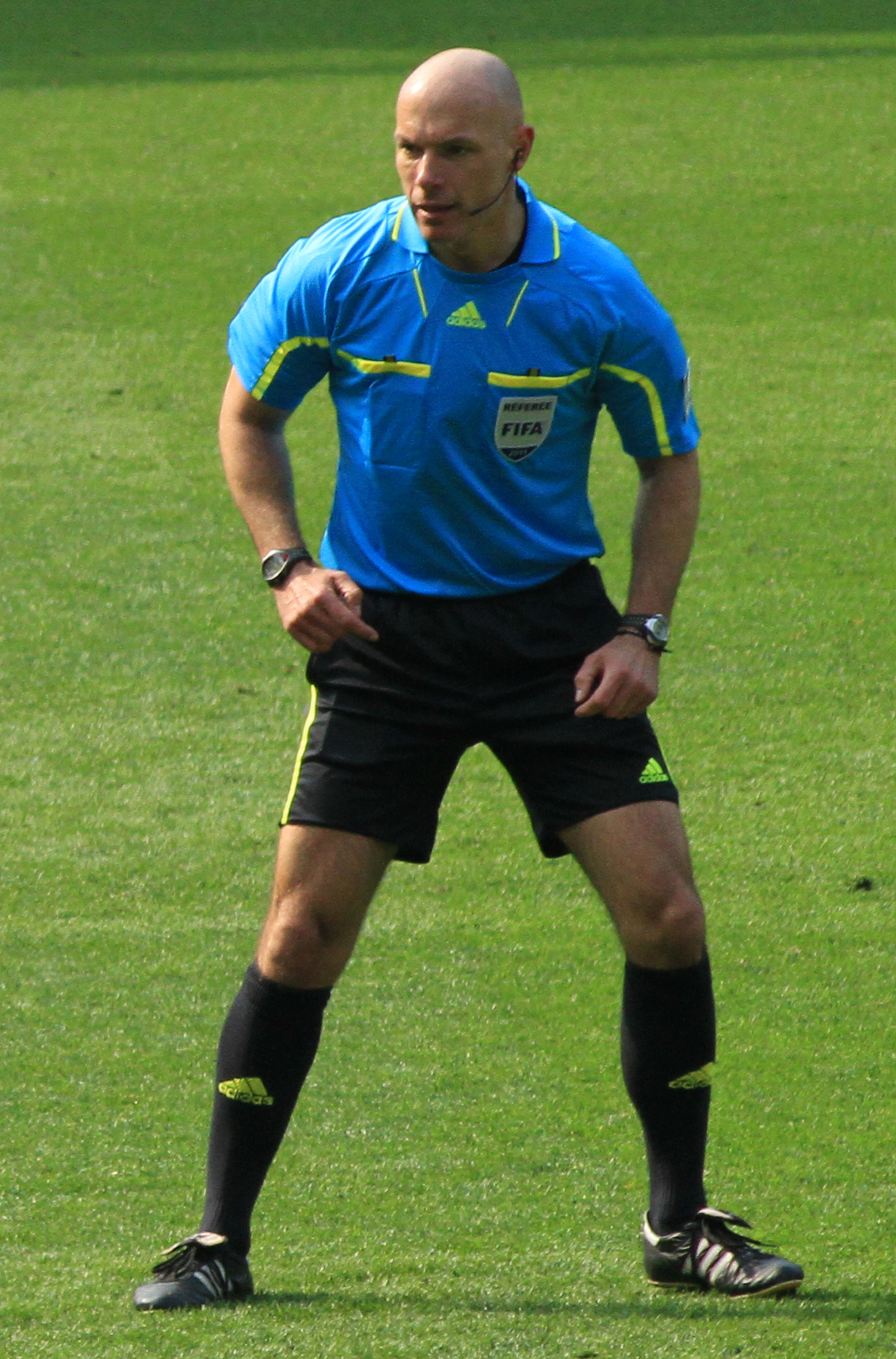
- Webb in 2011
- Full name: Howard Melton Webb
- Born: 14 July 1971 (age 55); Rotherham, England
- Other occupation: Police Officer with South Yorkshire Police; Chief Refereeing Officer for PGMOL

Domestic
Years	League	Role
1993–1995	Northern Counties East	Assistant referee
1995–1998	Northern Counties East	Referee
1996–1998	Football League	Assistant referee
1998–2000	Premier League	Assistant referee
1998–2000	Football Conference	Referee
2000–2003	Football League	Referee
2003–2014	Premier League	Referee

International
Years	League	Role
2005–2014	FIFA listed	Referee

Howard Melton Webb MBE (born 14 July 1971) is an English former professional football referee who officiated primarily in the Premier League from 2003 to 2014, as well as for FIFA as a FIFA international referee from 2005 to 2014.

Webb is counted amongst the all-time top referees by the International Federation of Football History and Statistics and refereed a number of notable matches in England including the FA Cup final, the FA Community Shield and the final of the League Cup. In 2010, he became the first person to referee the finals of both the UEFA Champions League and FIFA World Cup in the same year.

Throughout his professional career, Webb drew praise for his authoritative and respected approach to refereeing from football bodies, pundits, colleagues, players and managers. He announced his retirement in August 2014 to become the technical director of the Professional Game Match Officials Board.

== Early life ==
Webb was born to Sylvia and Billy Webb and grew up in Rotherham, Yorkshire. His father was a referee for 35 years. He went to Brinsworth Comprehensive School.

== Refereeing career ==
=== Early career ===
Webb first took up refereeing in local leagues in 1989. In 1993, he progressed to the Northern Counties East League as an assistant referee, becoming a referee for that league two years later.

In 1996, he was appointed as a Football League assistant referee and, in 1998, attained the same role in the Premier League, as well as being promoted to the Football Conference as a full referee. He was a police officer with South Yorkshire Police but took sabbatical leave to concentrate on his refereeing.

=== Professional domestic career ===
In 2000, Webb was included on the National List of Football League referees and three years later was promoted to the Select Group of professional referees who can take charge of Premier League games. His first game in the top tier of English football was on 18 October 2003 when he took charge of a 0–0 draw between Fulham and Wolverhampton Wanderers. He was appointed to FIFA's international referees' list in 2005.

Since then, Webb has been appointed to referee some of world football's highest-profile matches, including a UEFA Champions League final and a FIFA World Cup final.

Webb officiated the 2005 Community Shield at Cardiff's Millennium Stadium, the annual match between the Premier League winners and the FA Cup winners of the previous season. League winners Chelsea went 2–0 up through two Didier Drogba goals, but Cesc Fàbregas netted a goal for FA Cup winners Arsenal 25 minutes before the end. It was a tense finale, but Chelsea held on to secure a 2–1 victory. Webb issued three yellow cards (to Frank Lampard, Claude Makélélé and Fàbregas) in a game that saw 11 substitutions.

In May 2006, Webb took charge of the FA Trophy final at Upton Park in London. Grays Athletic beat Woking 2–0 through goals from Dennis Oli and Glenn Poole, both just before half-time. No players found their way into the book.

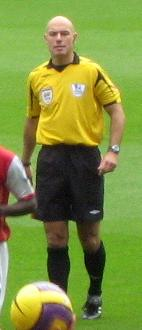
Webb refereeing a match in 2007

The 2007 Football League Cup final at the Millennium Stadium in Cardiff was an incident-filled match. The match ended with a brawl, with most of the players on the pitch becoming involved. Managers José Mourinho and Arsène Wenger both entered the pitch in an attempt to calm the situation. As a result of the mêlée, Webb sent off Mikel John Obi of Chelsea and Kolo Touré and Emmanuel Adebayor of Arsenal, and showed yellow cards to Frank Lampard and Cesc Fàbregas. This was the first time that three red cards had been shown in a League Cup final. Indeed, before this game, only three red cards had been shown in all of the previous finals.

Webb took charge of the 2009 FA Cup final, the 128th final of the world's oldest domestic football cup competition. It was played at Wembley Stadium in London and was the third time that an FA Cup final had been staged at the stadium since it was rebuilt. The match was contested by Chelsea and Everton, with Chelsea coming out on top to record their fifth FA Cup success. Webb cautioned Mikel John Obi and Frank Lampard of Chelsea and Tony Hibbert, Phil Neville and Leighton Baines of Everton.

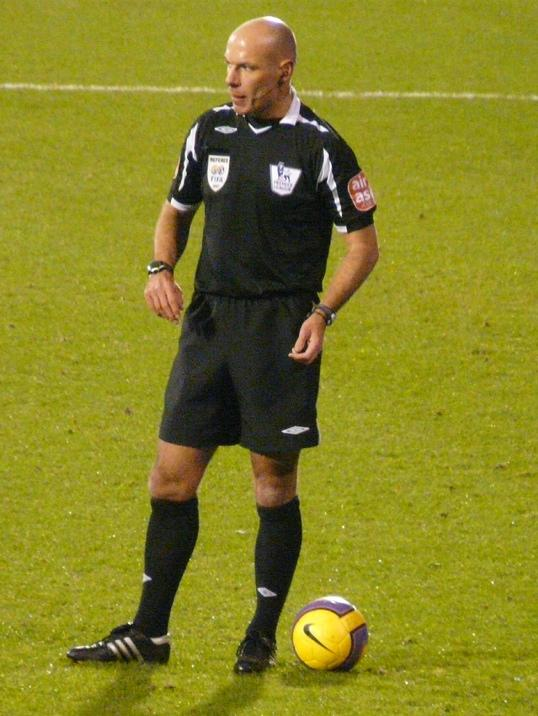
Webb in 2007

=== European and international career ===
Webb's first international game was at Windsor Park, Belfast, in November 2005 when Northern Ireland hosted Portugal in a friendly match. It ended 1–1 with the home side scoring both goals: Northern Ireland went 1–0 down just before half-time through a Stephen Craigan own goal but Warren Feeney salvaged a draw by netting in the second half. Tony Capaldi, Keith Gillespie and James Quinn were booked for Northern Ireland.

The 2006 European Under-21 Championship qualifying rounds began in August 2004, with the finals taking place in Portugal in May and June 2006. Webb officiated a group A match between France and Portugal, which the former won 1–0, and a Group B match between Italy and Ukraine, which the Italians won. Webb also took charge of one of the two semi-finals, which saw Ukraine beat Serbia and Montenegro 5–4 on penalties after a 0–0 draw. He was also appointed fourth official for the final in Porto, where the Netherlands beat Ukraine 3–0.

A UEFA Champions League group match on 26 September 2006 between Steaua București and Lyon was Webb's first European appointment. The match, played at the Ghencea Stadium in Bucharest, finished 3–0 to Lyon, with Webb issuing four yellow cards during the course of the match.

Webb was selected to officiate at the 2007 U-20 World Cup in Canada and his first appointment was a Group D match between Poland and Brazil at Montreal's Olympic Stadium. He then took charge of a group C game between Mexico and Portugal at the National Soccer Stadium in Toronto and a group A match between Canada and Congo at the Commonwealth Stadium in Edmonton. Webb was retained for the knock-out stage of the tournament, and refereed a quarter-final in Montreal where Chile defeated Nigeria 4–0 with all four goals being scored in extra time.

In December 2007, Webb was selected as England's representative to referee at UEFA Euro 2008, with Darren Cann and Michael Mullarkey as his assistants. Whilst refereeing his first match of the tournament, a Group B match between Austria and Poland, and with less than one minute left in stoppage time, he awarded Austria a penalty kick after he adjudged Poland's Mariusz Lewandowski to have pulled the shirt of Sebastian Prödl. The penalty was converted and the match finished 1–1. UEFA official William Gaillard said the decision was not controversial and was correct. Webb said that "the penalty was clear and I hope that people later will look at it and realise it was the only decision that could be taken". Webb refereed his second game of Euro 2008 when he took charge of a Group D match in which Greece lost 2–1 to Spain. UEFA stated on 19 June that Webb had not been selected to referee matches in the knock-out phase of the tournament.

Webb was handed a one-week demotion to the Football League Championship from officiating in the Premier League in April 2009 after he awarded Manchester United a penalty kick while they trailed 2–0 to Tottenham Hotspur. The penalty was converted and United went on to win the match 5–2. Webb later admitted he had made "a mistake" but had awarded the penalty "honestly".

In June 2009, Webb was one of the referees at the 2009 FIFA Confederations Cup in South Africa, where he took charge of two games: A 4–3 win for Brazil over Egypt, and a 0–0 draw between Iraq and New Zealand. Throughout the tournament, Webb wrote a regular blog detailing his experiences as a referee while at the tournament.

In May 2010, Webb was announced as the referee for the 2010 Champions League final at the Santiago Bernabéu Stadium in Madrid. He showed yellow cards to Martín Demichelis and Mark van Bommel of Bayern Munich and cautioned Cristian Chivu of Inter Milan. Inter won the match 2–0 through two goals by striker Diego Milito.

In December 2011, Webb was named one of the 12 referees selected by UEFA to take charge of games at Euro 2012. He was in charge of a Group A fixture between Russia and Czech Republic on the opening day in Wrocław, a Group C fixture between Italy and Croatia in Poznań, and a quarter-final between the Czech Republic and Portugal in Warsaw.

Webb was selected as a referee for the 2013 Confederations Cup in Brazil. He refereed a Group A match in Fortaleza between Mexico and Brazil, which ended in a 2–0 win for the home nation; Webb issued five cautions.

==== 2010 FIFA World Cup ====
On 24 October 2008, FIFA announced that Webb was on the provisional list of referees for the 2010 World Cup in South Africa and later confirmed that Webb had been selected as a referee for the finals. Webb took charge of a Group H match between Spain and Switzerland in Durban, where Switzerland stunned Spain with a 1–0 win; a Group F match between Italy and Slovakia in Johannesburg, which also resulted in an upset as Slovakia won and ended Italy's reign as world champions; and a round of 16 knockout match between Brazil and Chile, also in Johannesburg.

Webb refereed the World Cup final between the Netherlands and Spain. He was assisted by Darren Cann and Michael Mullarkey in Johannesburg's Soccer City stadium. Webb was the first English referee to take charge of a World Cup final since Jack Taylor in 1974 – a game in which the Netherlands lost to West Germany. Webb issued 14 yellow cards, including two to the Netherlands' John Heitinga who was subsequently sent off, more than doubling the former record of six yellows for a World Cup final, set in 1986.

The match was seen as a very difficult one to referee. The Dutch were criticised for their rough play, and some thought Webb was generous for not showing any red cards to the Dutch players until ten minutes before the end of extra time. Webb later conceded that had he had a better viewing angle of a high challenge from Nigel de Jong he would have sent him off, and De Jong later admitted he was "lucky" to only receive a yellow card. FIFA president Sepp Blatter defended Webb, noting that it was "not easy" to control such a match. Former Premier League referee Jeff Winter said Webb "had a superb game" while Scotland's Alan Hansen condemned the Dutch, saying that, "Webb tried to make the game flow but on this occasion he was left with no choice." The British Referees' Association said "it would be almost impossible to disagree with any of the bookings he issued", while former FA Cup final referee Keith Hackett noted that "anyone who criticises the officials lacks the knowledge and experience of someone who has refereed" and called on FIFA to punish the Dutch players who castigated Webb to the press.

==== 2014 FIFA World Cup ====
Webb took charge of three qualifiers for the 2014 World Cup. He refereed the UEFA qualification group D match between Turkey and Romania in October 2012 in Istanbul, the Group E match between Norway and Switzerland in September 2013 in Oslo and the Group A match between Croatia and Belgium in October 2013 in Zagreb. In January 2014, it was announced that Webb had been included on the referees' list for the finals in Brazil.

On 19 June, he officiated the Group C match between Colombia and the Ivory Coast in Brasília. Webb also refereed the first knockout match on 28 June between Brazil and Chile in Belo Horizonte. Host nation Brazil won a penalty shootout 3–2 after the game finished 1–1 after extra-time.

=== Retirement from active refereeing ===
On 6 August 2014, the Premier League announced that Webb had retired from active refereeing in order to take up the role of technical director of the Professional Game Match Officials Board. Webb said, "Refereeing has given me so much and I think it's important that match officials who have had the rewards remain in the game to pass on their knowledge."

Webb then became director of referees for the Saudi Arabian Football Federation, while also joining BT Sport as an analyst. After resigning his position with SAFF in January 2017 – to be replaced by Mark Clattenburg – it was announced that from March 2017 he would become the Manager of Video Assistant Referee Operations for Major League Soccer's Professional Referee Organization.

In August 2022 it was announced that Webb would return to the Professional Game Match Officials Limited as chief refereeing officer.

== Statistics ==
=== Match breakdown ===
Webb refereed 296 Premier League matches, 43 in the FA Cup, 36 in the Champions League, 19 in the EFL Cup, 6 in World Cups, 5 in European Championships, and 4 in Confederations Cups.

=== Games and cards ===
Season	Games	Total (yellow card)	(yellow card) per game	Total (red card)	(red card) per game
2000–01	26	58	2.23	1	0.038
2001–02	32	69	2.16	5	0.16
2002–03	39	145	3.72	4	0.10
2003–04	34	92	2.94	9	0.26
2004–05	34	100	2.94	2	0.06
2005–06	47	117	2.49	7	0.15
2006–07	45	156	3.47	9	0.20
2007–08	46	166	3.61	4	0.09
2008–09	48	158	3.29	6	0.13
2009–10	45	177	3.93	5	0.11
2010–11	45	141	3.13	6	0.13
2011–12	51	167	3.28	5	0.10
2012–13	42	148	3.52	5	0.12
Total	534	1,694	3.17	68	0.13

Statistics for all competitions including domestic, European and international. Records prior to 2000–01 are not available.

=== Major international matches refereed ===
Date	Match	Tournament	Venue	Result	Ref
22 May 2010	Bayern Munich vs. Inter Milan	2010 UEFA Champions League final	Santiago Bernabéu Stadium, Madrid	0–2	
11 July 2010	Netherlands vs. Spain	2010 FIFA World Cup final	Soccer City Stadium, Johannesburg	0–1 (a.e.t.)	

=== Cautions and dismissals ===
Webb issued at least one card in every game he refereed in the 2002–03 and 2004–05 seasons. The first red card he showed in the Premier League was to Michael Svensson of Southampton for a second bookable offence in a 0–0 draw at Bolton Wanderers on 8 November 2003. The 2003–04 season saw Webb issue his highest proportion of red cards yet: nine in 34 games. Between 17 February and 17 March 2007, he showed five red cards all in the 90th minute of matches.

In four fixtures since the 2000–01 season he has issued two red cards in the same game, three times dismissing one player from either side, and once reducing one team (Wimbledon in December 2001) to nine men. He has once shown three red cards in the same match: the 2007 Football League Cup Final.

Webb has sent off two goalkeepers since 2000–01: Kelvin Davis of Wimbledon in December 2001 and John Filan of Wigan Athletic in March 2004.

== Personal life ==
Webb was married and has three children. He and his first wife separated in 2016. He is in a relationship with Bibiana Steinhaus, a German Bundesliga referee, whom he married in March 2021.

He was a sergeant in the South Yorkshire Police before turning professional as a referee. He was appointed a Member of the Order of the British Empire (MBE) in the 2011 New Year Honours for services to football.

He is a Rotherham United supporter.

In June 2011, Webb was made president of the Baris Northern Counties East Football League, a league in which he had once officiated. In July 2011 he received an Honorary Doctor of Science degree from the University of Bedfordshire. In November 2011 he also gained an honorary degree from York St John University as a Doctor of Health Sciences.

He began his career in policing in 1993 and took a five-year career break in 2008 to focus on refereeing. He returned to the South Yorkshire Police in April 2013.

== Honours ==
- IFFHS World's Best Referee: 2010, 2013

== Bibliography ==
Date	Title	Publisher	ISBN
24 August 2017	The Man in the Middle: The Autobiography of the World Cup Final Referee	Simon & Schuster UK	978-1-4711-5977-8

Sporting positions (England) Howard Webb
Preceded by 2006 FIFA World Cup Final (Argentina) Horacio Elizondo	2010 FIFA World Cup Final Referee	Succeeded by 2014 FIFA World Cup Final (Italy) Nicola Rizzoli
Preceded by 2009 UEFA Champions League Final (Switzerland) Massimo Busacca	2010 UEFA Champions League Final Referee	Succeeded by 2011 UEFA Champions League Final (Hungary) Viktor Kassai
Preceded by Mike Dean	2009 FA Cup Final	Succeeded by Chris Foy
Preceded by Alan Wiley	2007 Football League Cup Final	Succeeded by Mark Halsey
Preceded by Phil Dowd	2006 FA Trophy Final	Succeeded by Chris Foy
Preceded by Mike Dean	2005 FA Community Shield	Succeeded by Martin Atkinson
