= Paul Marshall (cricketer) =

English cricketer

Personal information
- Full name: Paul Arthur Marshall
- Born: 6 November 1949 (age 77); Dinnington, Yorkshire, England
- Batting: Right-handed
- Bowling: Right-arm medium

Domestic team information
- Years: Team
- 1977–1987: Staffordshire

Career statistics
Competition	List A
Matches	2
Runs scored	2
Batting average	1.00
100s/50s	–/–
Top score	1
Balls bowled	–
Wickets	–
Bowling average	–
5 wickets in innings	–
10 wickets in match	–
Best bowling	–
Catches/stumpings	1/–
- Source: Cricinfo, 19 June 2011

Paul Arthur Marshall (born 6 November 1949) is a former English cricketer. Marshall was a right-handed batsman who bowled right-arm medium pace. He was born in Dinnington, Yorkshire.

Marshall made his debut for Staffordshire in the 1977 Minor Counties Championship against Cheshire. Marshall played Minor counties cricket for Staffordshire from 1977 to 1986, which included 62 Minor Counties Championship matches and 3 MCCA Knockout Trophy matches. In 1984, he made his List A debut against Gloucestershire in the NatWest Trophy. In this match he was dismissed for a single run by John Shepherd. He played a further List A match against Nottinghamshire in the 1985 NatWest Trophy. In this match he opened the batting, but was dismissed for a single run by Kevin Saxelby.
