= David Kitson (cricketer) =

English cricketer

Personal information
- Full name: David Lees Kitson
- Born: 13 September 1925; Batley, West Yorkshire
- Died: 6 May 2002 (aged 76); Ilminster, Somerset
- Batting: Right-handed
- Role: Batsman

Domestic team information
- Years: Team
- 1952–1954: Somerset
- First-class debut: 17 May 1952 Somerset v Hampshire
- Last First-class: 12 July 1954 Somerset v Derbyshire

Career statistics
Competition	First-class
Matches	32
Runs scored	886
Batting average	15.54
100s/50s	–/5
Top score	69
Catches/stumpings	3/–
- Source: CricketArchive, 9 December 2013

David Lees Kitson (13 September 1925 – 6 May 2002) was an English cricketer. He was a right-handed batsman who played 32 games scoring 882 runs for Somerset between 1952 and 1954. He was born in Batley, Yorkshire and died in Ilminster, Somerset.

Kitson was one of several Yorkshire League cricketers recruited by Somerset to bolster the county's fragile batting in the early 1950s, when the county finished bottom of the County Championship for four consecutive seasons. He played fairly regularly in 1953, when the county had temporarily dispensed with the services of Les Angell as Harold Gimblett's opening partner, and scored 589 runs in the season at an average of 17.84. His highest score was an innings of 69 against Leicestershire at Leicester in 1953. Angell returned to Somerset in 1954 and though Gimblett was unable to play, Kitson did not retain his place in the team and left the staff at the end of the season.

He remained in Somerset and later won some renown at bowls.
