= Throapham =

Hamlet in South Yorkshire, England

Coordinates: 53.379°N 1.206°W

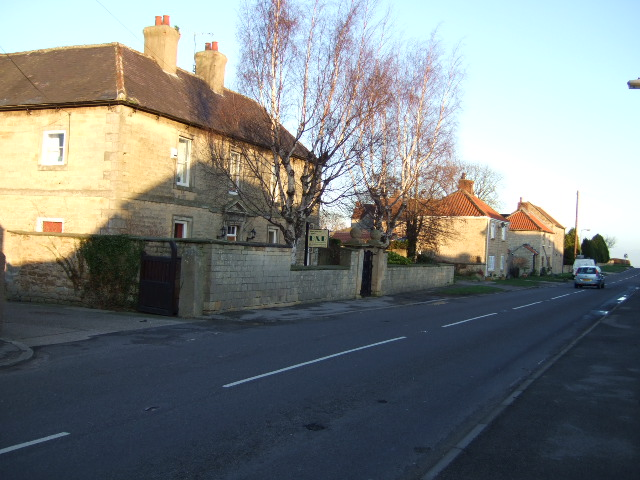
- Houses along the village street

- Location within South Yorkshire
- OS grid reference: SK529871
- Civil parish: Dinnington St John's
- Metropolitan borough: Rotherham
- Metropolitan county: South Yorkshire
- Region: Yorkshire and the Humber
- Country: England
- Sovereign state: United Kingdom
- Post town: SHEFFIELD
- Postcode district: S25
- Dialling code: 01909
- Police: South Yorkshire
- Fire: South Yorkshire
- Ambulance: Yorkshire
- UK Parliament: Rother Valley

Throapham is a hamlet in the civil parish of Dinnington St John's, in the Rotherham district, in the county of South Yorkshire, England.

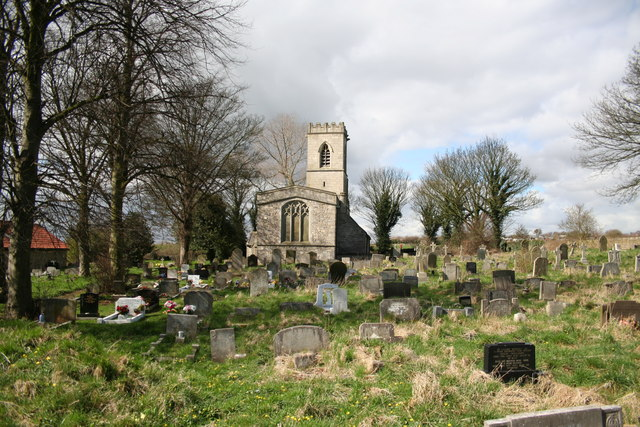
St. John's church

Throapham was historically a township in the ancient parish of St John's in the West Riding of Yorkshire. St John's parish church, a Grade I listed building, was in the neighbouring parish-town of St John's, a very small place, and the two places formed a single township known as St Johns with Throapham. In 1866 St Johns with Throapham became a civil parish, as did Letwell, the other township in the ancient parish. In 1954 the civil parish of St Johns with Throapham was abolished and merged with the civil parish of Dinnington to form the new civil parish of Dinnington St John's.

In 1974 Throapham was transferred to the new county of South Yorkshire.

== See also ==
- Listed buildings in Dinnington St. John's
