= Walker Wainwright =

English cricketer and umpire

Walker Wainwright (21 January 1882 – 31 December 1961) was an English first-class cricketer, who played twenty-four matches for Yorkshire County Cricket Club, and one for the Marylebone Cricket Club (MCC), between 1903 and 1905. He also umpired one Test match. He was the younger brother of Ted Wainwright.

Born in Rotherham, Yorkshire, England, Wainwright was a left-handed batsman, who scored 652 runs at 18.62, with a top score of 62 against Essex. He took twenty one catches and nineteen wickets at 30.63, with his slow left arm spin. His best bowling, 6 for 49, came against the MCC. His game playing for the MCC came in 1904. Wainwright also played for the Yorkshire Second XI from 1901 to 1903, Yorkshire Colts (1900–1902) and a non first-class match for Yorkshire in 1903.

After retiring he umpired in first-class cricket, mainly in games featuring Cambridge University at Fenner's. His only Test match as an umpire came when South Africa played England at Durban in January 1923.

Wainwright died on New Year's Eve 1961, in Winchester, Hampshire.
