= Strafforth and Tickhill =

Former district in Yorkshire, England

Coordinates: 53.432°N 1.109°W

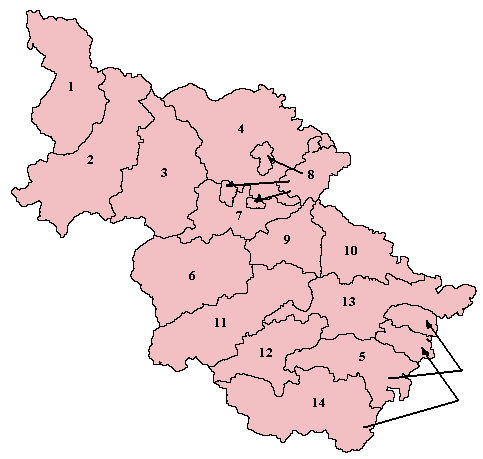
Wapentakes of the West Riding. The Lower Division is marked 5, and the Upper Division is marked 14, while the arrows indicate the detached parts.

Strafforth and Tickhill /ˈstræfərð/, originally known as Strafforth, was the southernmost wapentake in the West Riding of Yorkshire, England. The west of the district, plus a detached area to the east, constituted the Upper Division, while the central area and a detached part further to the east constituted the Lower Division.

Parishes in the Upper Division included Aston, Barnby Dun, Braithwell, Conisbrough, Dinnington, Ecclesfield, Firbeck, Handsworth, Harthill, Hatfield, Hooton Roberts, Laughton-en-le-Morthen, Maltby, Ravenfield, Rawmarsh, Rotherham, Sheffield, Slade Hooton, South Anston, Sprotborough, Stone, Thorpe Salvin, Thrybergh, Todwick, Treeton, Wales, Wath-upon-Dearne, Whiston, Wickersley and parts of Finningley.

The Lower Division included the parishes of Adwick le Street, Adwick upon Dearne, Arksey, Armthorpe, Bolton-upon-Dearne, Brodsworth, Darfield, Doncaster, Fishlake, High Melton, Hooton Pagnell, Kirk Sandall, Mexborough, Rossington, Thorne, Thurnscoe, Tickhill, Wadworth, Warmsworth, parts of Blyth, Nottinghamshire and the extra-parochial area of Hampole.

The original meeting place of the wapentake is unknown, but may have been where the Ryknield Street crossed the rivers Don and Dearne.

Numerous Yorkshire manors, all originally situated within the Strafforth wapentake, were among the many properties and honours in the Kingdom of England awarded by William the Conqueror to William de Warenne.

The Earldom of Strafford takes its name from a variant of this district name, wherein the first incumbent Thomas Wentworth, 1st Earl of Strafford originated.

== See also ==
- Hallamshire
