= Listed buildings in Laughton en le Morthen =

Laughton en le Morthen is a civil parish in the Metropolitan Borough of Rotherham, South Yorkshire, England. The parish contains 27 listed buildings that are recorded in the National Heritage List for England. Of these, one is listed at Grade I, the highest of the three grades, two are at Grade II*, the middle grade, and the others are at Grade II, the lowest grade. The parish contains the village of Laughton en le Morthen, the smaller settlements of Brookhouse, Carr, and Slade Hooton, and the surrounding countryside. Most of the listed buildings are houses, cottages and associated structures, farmhouses and farm buildings. The other listed buildings include a church and its vicarage, a school, a cascade, and a telephone kiosk.

== Key ==
Grade	Criteria
I	Buildings of exceptional interest, sometimes considered to be internationally important
II*	Particularly important buildings of more than special interest
II	Buildings of national importance and special interest

== Buildings ==
Name and location	Photograph	Date	Notes	Grade
All Saints Church; 53.38817°N 1.22398°W		Before 1066	The church was altered and extended through the centuries, the chancel dates from the 12th century, and most of the rest of the church from the 14th century, and it was restored in 1853 by George Gilbert Scott. The church is built in limestone, lined with sandstone, and has lead roofs. It consists of a west steeple with a north Saxon porticus, a nave, north and south aisles, a south porch, and a chancel with a north organ chamber and vestry. The steeple has a tower with buttresses, and a three-light west window, above which are slit windows, a clock face, two-light bell openings, an octagonal embattled parapet with crocketed pinnacles, and flying buttresses linking to an octagonal spire. The porticus has a segmental-arched doorway within a Saxon round arch.	I
Low Farmhouse; 53.40734°N 1.23437°W	—	16th century	The farmhouse has retained some internal timber framing, and is built in limestone, with quoins, oversailing eaves, and a pantile roof, hipped on the right. There are two storeys and an L-shaped plan, with a front range of two bays, and a rear wing on the right. On the front is a doorway and casement windows, in the right return is a doorway with an architrave, and in the left return is an oval window with a dated keystone.	II
Old Hall Farmhouse and outbuilding 53.38728°N 1.22223°W		Late 16th century	The oldest part is the outbuilding, which contains some internal timber framing, and the farmhouse is dated 1633. The buildings are in magnesian limestone, with quoins, and roofs of stone slate and Welsh slate with coped gables. The farmhouse has two storeys and an attic, and a front of five bays. There are two doorways, one with a rusticated surround, and the other with a quoined surround and a cambered lintel. The windows either have single lights, or are mullioned with hood moulds, some also have transoms, and there is a dormer window. The outbuilding has two storeys and an L-shaped plan with a front of three bays. It contains a wide doorway, a hatch, and windows.	II
All Saints School; 53.38852°N 1.22344°W		c. 1610	The school, which was extended in 1845, is in limestone on a plinth, with quoins, and a Welsh slate roof with moulded gable copings, apex finials, and a ridge ventilator. There are two storeys, the original part has three bays, and the extension added two bays. On the front is a gabled porch and a blocked arched doorway, and the right return contains a later doorway with a pointed arch and a chamfered surround. Most of the windows are mullioned with hood moulds, and some also have transoms.	II
Lea Cottage, The Cottage and Cobweb Cottage; 53.39515°N 1.23033°W	—	17th century	A house, later divided into three cottages, in limestone, with quoins, and a Welsh slate roof with coped gables and shaped kneelers. There are two storeys and three bays. The right cottage doorway has a bonded surround, and the other openings have plain surrounds.	II
Outbuilding east of Old Hall Farmhouse; 53.38731°N 1.22194°W		17th century	The farm building, later used as garages, is in magnesian limestone with quoins and a pantile roof. There are two storeys and three bays. In the ground floor, each bay contains a garage door, and above are two-light casement windows. On the right return, external steps lead to an upper floor doorway.	II
Slade Hooton Hall Farmhouse; 53.39798°N 1.21136°W	—	Mid17th century	The farmhouse is in magnesian limestone with quoins and a pantile roof. There are two storeys and an attic, and four bays. On the front is a porch, and a doorway with a chamfered quoined surround. The windows on the front are casements, in the returns are mullioned windows, the ground floor windows have hood moulds, and in the right return is a bay window.	II
Stables northeast of The Vicarage; 53.38771°N 1.22376°W	—	17th century	The stables and outbuilding surround a yard enclosed by a wall. The stable is in stone, partly rendered, the outbuilding in brick, and the roofs are in pantile with coped gables and kneelers. The stable has a single storey and an attic, and an L-shaped plan. It contains a segmental-arched cart entry with a keystone, and various other openings. The outbuilding has a single storey, and contains three doors and a casement window.	II
2 Church Corner, Laughton en le Morthen; 53.38784°N 1.22466°W	—	Late 17th century	A row of cottages combined into a house, in magnesian limestone, with quoins, stone slate eaves courses, and a pantile roof with coped gables and shaped kneelers. There are two storeys and six bays. The doorway has a quoined chamfered surround and a pedimented hood. Some of the windows are mullioned, and others are 20th-century casements.	II
Brookhouse Farmhouse; 53.39522°N 1.22995°W	—	Late 17th century	The farmhouse is in limestone with quoins and a tile roof. There are two storeys and an attic, and four bays. Most of the windows are mullioned, some with hood moulds, and others have a single light, or are replacement casements.	II
Slade Hooton Hall; 53.39740°N 1.21314°W		1698	A small country house in limestone on a plinth, with chamfered quoin strips, a floor band, a decorative eaves cornice with acanthus motifs, and a hipped Cornish slate roof. There are two storeys and attics, and fronts of five and four bays. The central doorway has an architrave, a fanlight in a rusticated panel, a frieze with a carving and the date, and a decorative cornice with egg and dart and acanthus motifs. The windows are sashes, the window above the doorway with an architrave, an apron, and a segmental pediment with a mask in the tympanum. On the sides are gabled dormers.	II*
Front garden wall, gateway and gate piers, Slade Hooton Hall; 53.39764°N 1.21323°W	—	c. 1700	The wall runs along the front garden and returns along the right side, and is in limestone with moulded copings. The gate piers on the front have moulded plinths, square rusticated shafts, cornices, and large ball finials, and those in the right return have moulded plinths, panelled shafts, cornices, and plinths to broken finials. In the right return is a doorway with a cambered head.	II
Orchard garden wall, steps and gate piers, Slade Hooton Hall; 53.39697°N 1.21445°W	—	c. 1700	The wall enclosing the rectangular orchard is in limestone, and is quoined, with moulded copings. At the west end, semicircular steps lead up to a gateway flanked by square piers with panelled shafts, cornices, and plinths for finials.	II
Stable and barn, Slade Hooton Hall; 53.39720°N 1.21329°W	—	1702	The stable block is the older, the barn being dated 1705. The buildings are in limestone with roofs of Welsh slate and pantile. The stable block has chamfered quoins, moulded gable copings, and giant voluted kneelers. There are two storeys and three bays. The stable contains a doorway with a moulded architrave and a mullioned fanlight, a cross window, and inserted garage doors. In the centre is an oculus with dated and initialled keystones. The barn has two storeys and two bays, and contains segmental-arched wagon entries with quoined surrounds, the entry at the rear with a dated keystone, and a hatch with an arched lintel.	II*
Church Farmhouse; 53.38765°N 1.22174°W		Early 18th century	A limestone farmhouse, with quoins, and a pantile roof with coped gables and shaped kneelers. There are 2½ storeys, three bays, and a rear wing on the right. Most of the windows are replacement casement windows, and in the rear wing is a two-light mullioned window.	II
Barn, Manor Farm; 53.38666°N 1.21866°W	—	Early 18th century (probable)	The barn is in magnesian limestone with quoins and a pantile roof. There is a single storey and five bays. The barn contains a central wagon entrance with a wooden lintel, slit vents, a hatch, and a small doorway.	II
Gateway, Old Hall Farm; 53.38761°N 1.22249°W		1742	The gateway is in magnesian limestone. It has square columns with projecting bands of decorated rustication, a lintel with a keystone, surmounted by a carved frieze with rusticated corner blocks. Over this is a cornice, and a vase finial flanked by scrolls. At the rear, the centre of the frieze is inscribed with the date.	II
18 Carr Lane, Carr; 53.40644°N 1.23348°W	—	Mid 18th century	A small house in magnesian limestone, partly roughcast, with quoins, and a pantile roof with coped gables and shaped kneelers. There are two storeys and three bays. The central doorway has a chamfered surround.	II
9 and 11 Church Corner, Laughton en le Morthen; 53.38752°N 1.22469°W	—	Mid 18th century	A pair of houses in magnesian limestone, with quoins, a floor band, an eaves cornice, and stone slate eaves courses to a pantile roof with the remains of moulded gable copings and shaped kneelers. There are two storeys and five bays. The doorway on the front has an architrave, and the windows either have single lights, or are mullioned with casements. At the rear are the remains of a sundial.	II
11 High Street, Laughton en le Morthen; 53.38722°N 1.21949°W	—	Mid 18th century	The house is in magnesian limestone, with tabled and dentilled eaves, and a pantile roof with coped gables and shaped kneelers. There are two storeys and three bays. The central doorway and the windows, which are three-light casements, have keystones.	II
Cascade, Laughton Pond; 53.40100°N 1.18327°W		1774–77	The cascade was designed by Lancelot 'Capability' Brown as a part of his scheme for the grounds of Roche Abbey. It consists of blocks of magnesian limestone arranged in tiers, with a height of about 3 metres (9.8 ft).	II
Pear Tree Farmhouse; 53.39512°N 1.23055°W	—	Late 18th century	The farmhouse is in limestone on a plinth, with chamfered quoins and a pantile roof. There are three storeys, three bays and a two-storey rear wing. The rear wing has stone slate eaves courses, a coped gable and shaped kneelers. The central doorway has an architrave, most of the windows are sash windows, those in the ground floor with architraves, and the outer bays of the top floor contain casement windows.	II
Newhall Grange; 53.41412°N 1.24576°W	—	1802	A house in sandstone on a plinth, with sill bands, a modillion eaves cornice, and a hipped stone slate roof. There are three storeys, three bays, and recessed single storey wings. Steps lead up to the central doorway that has an architrave, and a segmental pediment on consoles. The windows are sashes, in the ground floor they are tripartite with pediments over the middle lights, and elsewhere, the window over the doorway has a pediment.	II
Farm buildings, Newhall Grange; 53.41377°N 1.24658°W	—	1802	A combination farm building in sandstone, with stone slate eaves, a moulded eaves band, and hipped pantile roofs. It forms a U-shaped plan, mostly with two storeys, and with a single-storey four-bay shelter shed. The central range contains a cowhouse and a stable with a hayloft above, and the right range has been converted for residential use. The openings include a round-arched wagon entrance, doorways, windows, a blind quatrefoil, and square and round pitching holes.	II
The Vicarage; 53.38763°N 1.22397°W		Early to mid 19th century	The vicarage is in magnesian limestone on a plinth, with a floor band, a wooden modillion eaves cornice, and a Welsh slate roof with coped gables. There are two storeys and an attic, and three bays. The central doorway has an architrave, a fanlight, and a cornice on consoles. Most of the windows are sashes, at the rear are two French windows, and in the attic is a round-headed casement window.	II
Manor Farmhouse; 53.38712°N 1.21910°W		1859	The farmhouse is in magnesian limestone on a chamfered plinth, with quoins, and a Welsh slate roof with moulded gable copings and shaped kneelers. There are two storeys, a double depth plan with the rear range extending to the right, and a front of three bays, the middle bay with a gable and a finial. The central doorway has a chamfered quoined surround, a fanlight and a hood mould. The windows are casements, most with hood moulds, and in the gable above the doorway is a recessed dated plaque.	II
Telephone kiosk, Slade Hooton; 53.39775°N 1.21221°W	—	1935	A K6 type telephone kiosk, designed by Giles Gilbert Scott. Constructed in cast iron with a square plan and a dome, it has three unperforated crowns in the top panels.	II
