= Malcolm Fairley =

British criminal and sex offender (1952–2024)

- Born: 1952; Silksworth, Sunderland, England
- Died: 28 May 2024 (aged 72); HM Prison Hull, Kingston upon Hull, England
- Occupation: Labourer
- Children: 3
- Status: Deceased
- Convictions: Burglary, indecent assault, rape
- Penalty: Life imprisonment

Malcolm Fairley (17 August 1952 – 28 May 2024) was a British criminal and sex offender, who in 1984 committed a series of burglaries and violent sexual crimes in the Bedfordshire, Buckinghamshire and Hertfordshire areas of England, and more specifically, in an area of those counties known as the Triangle. Fairley earned the nickname The Fox not only because he would build dens in the houses of his victims, before committing his crimes, which included rape, indecent assault and violent assault on the occupants, but also for what was considered by police to be his cunning.

Fairley committed the first crime for which he would become notorious in April 1984, and went on to commit several more offences, many of them using increasing violence against his victims, over the summer of that year. He was finally apprehended in September 1984 after briefly moving his activities to his native County Durham, and when police linked that crime to those in the Home Counties. The operation to catch him involved 200 police officers, and is an early example of computers being used to help cross-reference information during a criminal investigation. The operation cost Bedfordshire Police £200,000. Fairley was convicted at St Albans Crown Court in February 1985, and given six life sentences. Presiding judge, Mr Justice Caulfield described Fairley as "a decadent advertisement for evil pornographers".

== Early life ==
Born in Silksworth to the south of Sunderland, Fairley was the youngest of nine children. He came to the attention of the police as a teenager, for committing theft and burglary, and spent much of his twenties in and out of prison. Married twice, his first wife left him after he became violent towards her, while his second marriage produced three children. After living in the Peterlee area of County Durham, in 1983 he moved to Leighton Buzzard in Bedfordshire, where he took a series of labouring jobs at firms based in the Home Counties.

== Crimes as The Fox ==
Fairley's modus operandi as The Fox was to either burgle his victims while they were not at home, spending time in the property where he would construct a den from blankets and furniture, watch television and take food from the fridge, or to break into the property while the occupants were asleep. In these latter instances, the victims would typically wake to find Fairley, wearing gloves, and a mask to conceal his face, while brandishing a shotgun. He would then subdue the occupants before committing either sexual assault on them, or rape. Often he had observed the properties he planned to target in advance, and following an attack would make his getaway across open countryside. It was his habit of constructing dens in the properties he targeted that would lead to the media giving him the nickname The Fox.

After committing a series of burglaries in March 1984, Fairley carried out the first sex-related crime for which he would become notorious as The Fox on 11 April, when he broke into the home of a 74-year-old woman in Leighton Buzzard. She resisted his attempts to sexually assault her and he ran off. He then began to break into a series of houses, where he would look at photographs, before burgling the home of a 35-year-old man in the Buckinghamshire village of Cheddington on the evening of 10 May. There, he stole a 12 bore shotgun and cartridges, along with £300, but waited for the occupant to return home, at which point Fairley tied the victim up, and after watching pornographic videos, sexually assaulted the man. He then buried the gun, but was unable to find it again.

After committing a further three burglaries, Fairley's next victims were a couple in Tring, Hertfordshire. The couple were not home when Fairley broke into the property on 6 June. He found another shotgun and cartridges, along with a hacksaw that he used to saw off the barrels of the gun; he would use the weapon during the remainder of his crimes. He also removed photographs from albums, took clothes from drawers, and stole an anorak and a packet of peanuts. Three days after this incident, he broke into a house in Heath and Reach in Bedfordshire, where he constructed a den from blankets and furniture to conceal his presence from passers by and waited for the occupants to return, but fled when they did so. On the same night he broke into a house at nearby Leighton Buzzard after travelling there on foot, and using a mask made from a trouser leg to conceal his identity. The house belonged to a couple, the husband of whom tackled Fairley, an act that resulted in the shotgun being discharged, injuring the man's hand. Fairley fled the scene again, leaving behind the anorak and peanuts, and did not commit another offence for a further month; he would later claim the incident had unsettled him.

On 6 July 1984, Fairley broke into a house at Linslade in Bedfordshire, where he tied up the occupants, a couple, and indecently assaulted then raped the wife, then committed another sexual attack on 10 July. After this incident he shifted his attention to Edlesborough in Buckinghamshire, where he committed more burglaries, before attacking a 17-year-old girl, breaking into the bungalow she shared with her boyfriend and brother, before tying up the males and sexually assaulting all three. He then committed a series of burglaries in the Milton Keynes area, before driving to County Durham in mid-August. While driving along the M18, he reversed off the hard shoulder into woodland, then crossed fields to the small village of Brampton-en-le-Morthen near Rotherham, where he broke into the home of a couple and committed another rape. Afterwards he carefully cut out a portion of a bedsheet stained with his semen, then buried this along with the mask and gloves he had worn while committing the crime. He also buried the gun. As he drove away again, he accidentally reversed into bushes, scratching his car and leaving flecks of paintwork on the branches. He then continued his journey to Peterlee, where he committed two similar crimes, before returning to Milton Keynes, where he committed a further eleven offences before he was apprehended in September. His final attack was on a woman in Milton Keynes, whose house he broke into as she slept. Having abandoned the gun, he used a knife in an attempt to subdue her, but the woman fought him off and he fled.

== Investigation and arrest ==
Operation Peanut, the police operation to catch Fairley, would ultimately involve as many as 200 officers, as well as police dog units and the use of a Lynx helicopter belonging to the British Armed Forces, all at a cost to Bedfordshire Police of £200,000. At the time, the United Kingdom was in the midst of the 1984–85 miners' strike, with police forces contributing staff to police picket lines, and some officers were redirected from these duties to assist in the hunt for the Fox. An operations room was established at Dunstable Police Station in Bedfordshire, staffed partly by officers from Yorkshire who had helped in the hunt for Peter Sutcliffe, the Yorkshire Ripper, a few years earlier. A computer, which police nicknamed "Metal Micky", was also used to log and cross-reference details, an unusual occurrence for criminal investigations of the time, and a psychological profile of the Fox's possible character traits was constructed. Officers were stationed in barns and houses around the area known as the Triangle in an attempt to catch the attacker. Detective Chief Superintendent Brian Prickett, who led the investigation, described how at the height of the investigation police received as many as 300 calls an hour, all of which had to be followed up, while the case itself took two forms, "observation and protection of the public alongside the detective work".

The case had created a climate of fear in the area throughout the summer of 1984. Local people had bought extra locks for their doors and windows, while gun shops in the area reported an increase in sales, and people kept weapons such as knives by their bedsides. In spite of that summer's hot weather, residents slept with their windows closed, and were advised not to leave downstairs windows open during the evening. Some people started using codewords as a way of identifying visitors to their property. Local residents also formed vigilante groups who set up street patrols, and police feared that these groups might take the law into their own hands should they catch the Fox before officers could apprehend him.

The breakthrough in the case came after police linked the incident in Brampton-en-le-Morthen to those in the Home Counties. A police search of the area surrounding the M18 uncovered the items Fairley had buried, together with a broken branch containing flecks of yellow paint that, through forensic analysis, were subsequently identified as belonging to a "harvest yellow" British Leyland car, of which there were 1,500 registered at the time. Officers began the process of interviewing owners of vehicles that matched this description, a task that was aided by the attack in the north of England, which led police to believe the attacker may not be local to the Home Counties area. By September 1984, Fairley had relocated to Kentish Town in London, and it was at an address there on 11 September that officers spoke to him as part of their routine enquiries. Fairley was cleaning his car, a yellow Austin Allegro, when officers approached him, and upon closer inspection of the vehicle, the officers noticed scratches on the paintwork. These were subsequently matched to the flecks of paint from the branch. Officers also discovered two pairs of denim overalls in the vehicle from which one leg was missing, and screwdrivers that would later be found to match those used to break into properties. Investigators had also identified the attacker as being left-handed after the Fox used his left hand to tear off the night dress of a victim, and another victim had described him as wearing a watch on his right wrist. Fairley was asked to put on his wristwatch to check which hand he would use to do so. He placed the watch on his right wrist.

== Legal proceedings ==
By the time of his capture, Fairley had committed 80 crimes as The Fox. He confessed to these offences when questioned by police, but was said to be unrepentant, and claimed he had never loaded the gun again after the incident in Leighton Buzzard that had resulted in the hand injury of one of his victims. He also told police he had felt empowered by his acquisition of the firearm, stating "the gun is king. When I got the gun, I felt I could get what I wanted". On 14 September 1984, he appeared before Dunstable Magistrates Court, where he faced three charges of rape, two of burglary and one of possession of a firearm, and was remanded in custody.

His trial was held at St Albans Crown Court in February 1985, with Mr Justice Caulfield as presiding judge. Fairley's defence argued his poor education had contributed to his actions, and that he was "trying to imitate what he had seen on the video screen", a reference to the violent pornographic films he had viewed. Following his conviction, Fairley was sentenced to six life sentences. Passing sentence on 26 February, Caulfield told him: "There are degrees of wickedness beyond condemnatory description. Your crimes fall within this category. You desecrated and defiled men and women in their own homes...You are a decadent advertisement for evil pornographers." Of the makers of such material, Caulfield suggested they would "want to forget you [Fairley] as one of their worst casualties".

== Incarceration and death ==
Following his conviction, Fairley launched an appeal against the sentence, but the case was rejected by the Court of Appeal later on in 1985. He became eligible to be considered for parole in October 2023, but had his application rejected following a Parole Board hearing.

Fairley died at HM Prison Hull in Kingston upon Hull, on 28 May 2024, at the age of 72. On 7 May 2025, an inquest at Newcastle Coroner's Court heard evidence that Fairley had died from a heart attack. However, assistant coroner Sarah Middleton adjourned the inquest pending a prison investigation.

A review in November 2024 was carried out and it was found that Fairley died of natural causes.

== In popular culture ==
In 1990, the police investigation that led to Fairley's arrest was dramatized in an episode of the BBC Two series Indelible Evidence, which looked at criminal investigations in which forensic evidence played an important part in solving the case. The programme was introduced by Ludovic Kennedy and aired on 28 September 1990. In April 2024, Channel 5 aired the documentary The Intruder: He's Watching You From Within, which discussed the Fairley case and played recordings of police interviews in which he confessed to his crimes.

The Fairley case was the inspiration for Harriet Cummings' 2017 novel We All Begin As Strangers in which a serial burglar known as The Fox breaks into homes either to steal worthless items or leave behind strange objects. Also in 2017, a drawing of Fairley created by notorious prisoner Charles Bronson was among a dozen portraits depicting criminals by Bronson to be sold to a private art collector in Jersey for £545,000.

A documentary Manhunt: Chasing the Fox aired in 2025 on Netflix.

== Publications ==
- Szereto, Mitzi (2020). "The Summer of the Fox by Mark Fryers". The Best New True Crime Stories: Small Towns. Mango Media. ISBN 978-1-64250-280-0.
