= Listed buildings in Rotherham =

The listed buildings in the town of Rotherham are included in the following lists, divided by ward:

- Listed buildings in Rotherham (Boston Castle Ward)
- Listed buildings in Rotherham (East Ward)
- Listed buildings in Rotherham (Hoober Ward)
- Listed buildings in Rotherham (Keppel Ward)
- Listed buildings in Rotherham (Sitwell Ward)
- Listed buildings in Rotherham (West Ward)
- Listed buildings in Rotherham (Wingfield Ward)
