= Morthen =

Hamlet in South Yorkshire in England

Coordinates: 53.39°N 1.29°W

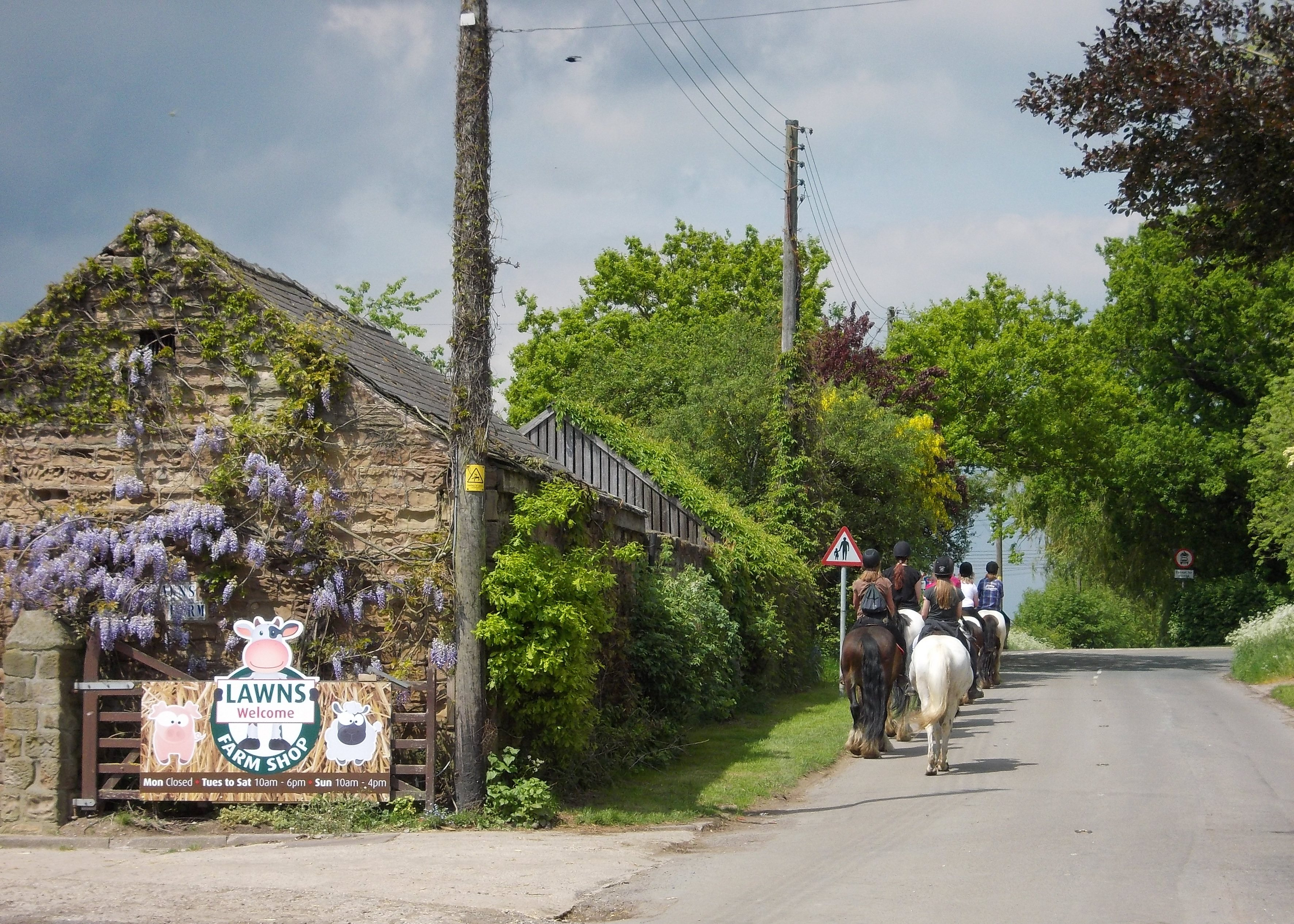
- York Lane, Morthen

- Location within South Yorkshire
- OS grid reference: SK4789
- Metropolitan borough: Rotherham
- Metropolitan county: South Yorkshire
- Region: Yorkshire and the Humber
- Country: England
- Sovereign state: United Kingdom
- Post town: ROTHERHAM
- Postcode district: S66
- Dialling code: 01709
- Police: South Yorkshire
- Fire: South Yorkshire
- Ambulance: Yorkshire
- UK Parliament: Rother Valley

Morthen is a hamlet in South Yorkshire in England, lying between Brampton-en-le-Morthen and Laughton-en-le-Morthen. The population of the hamlet as taken at the 2011 Census was less than 100. Details are included in the civil parish of Thurcroft.

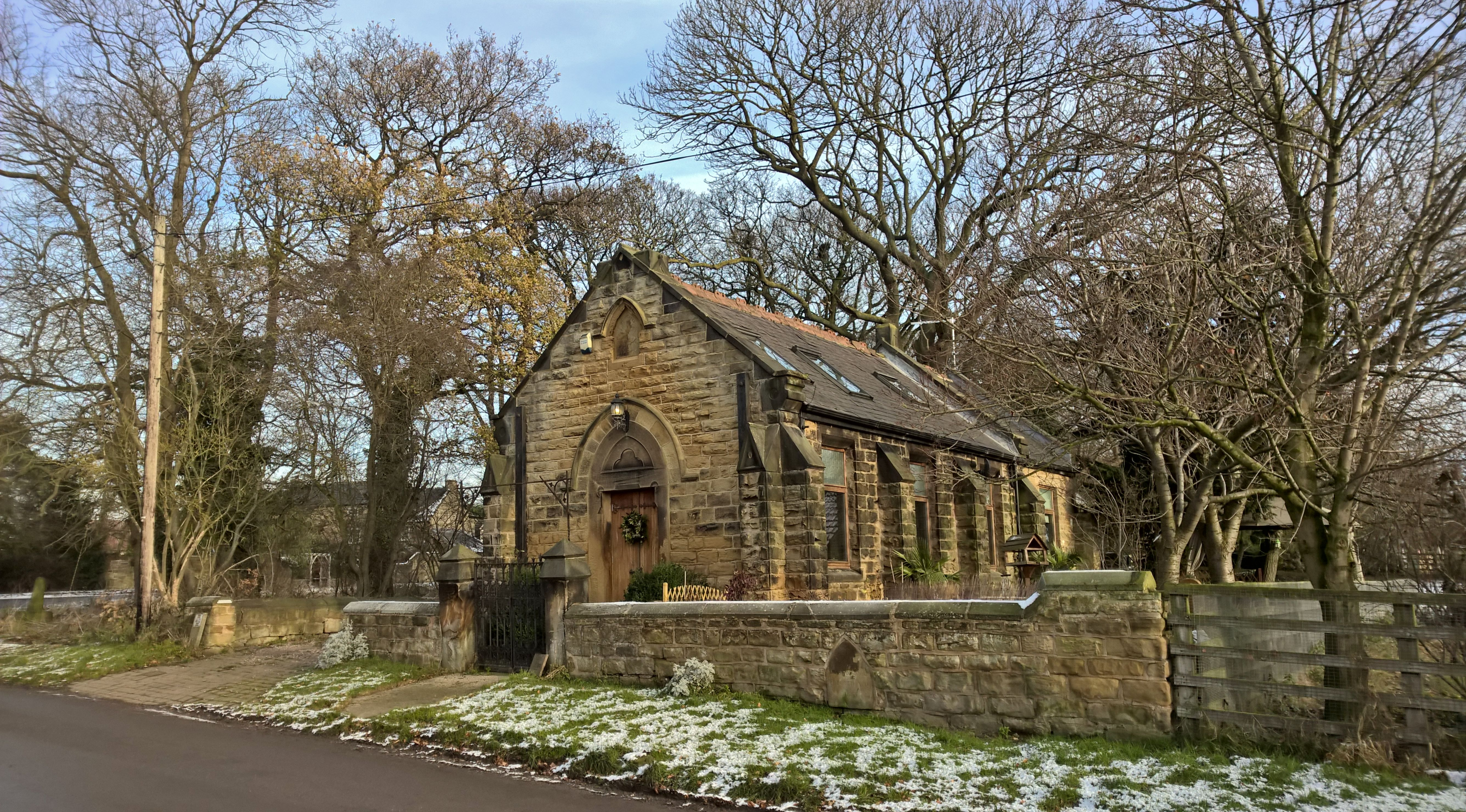
Former chapel of St James

Morthen lay in the Viking district also named "Morthen". This had already ceased to function by the Norman Conquest, but gave its name to several villages in the area. In the early Mediaeval period, Aston and Dinnington were also described as being "-in-Morthen".

The name of the hamlet originates in the Old Norse for "moorland assembly". The assembly probably met in a meadow lying next to the ridge running between Upper Whiston and the hamlet of Morthen.

However, another plausible source for the name of Morthen is offered in the book "Athelstan" by Paul Hill, in which he states Morthen means "Slaughter Field". Given the proximity of a nearby stump of a Saxon cross, which is said by Guy Points in his "Yorkshire. A Gazetteer of Anglo Saxon and Viking Sites" to commemorate the epic Battle of Brunanburgh in 937 would tie the cross and the name together.

== See also ==
- Listed buildings in Whiston, South Yorkshire
