= Bernard Caulfield =

Bernard Caulfield may refer to

- Bernard G. Caulfield (1828–1887), American politician
- Bernard Caulfield (judge) (1914–1994), British judge
