= Listed buildings in Thorpe Salvin =

Thorpe Salvin is a civil parish in the Metropolitan Borough of Rotherham, South Yorkshire, England. The parish contains 14 listed buildings that are recorded in the National Heritage List for England. Of these, one is listed at Grade I, the highest of the three grades, two are at Grade II*, the middle grade, and the others are at Grade II, the lowest grade. The parish contains the village of Thorpe Salvin and the surrounding countryside. The Chesterfield Canal runs through the parish, and the listed buildings associated with this are locks, bridges, milestones, and an aqueduct. The other listed buildings consist of a church, headstones and a sundial in the churchyard, the ruins of a manor house and its gatehouse, and a row of cottages.

== Key ==
Grade	Criteria
I	Buildings of exceptional interest, sometimes considered to be internationally important
II*	Particularly important buildings of more than special interest
II	Buildings of national importance and special interest

== Buildings ==
Name and location	Photograph	Date	Notes	Grade
St Peter's Church; 53.32476°N 1.22009°W		Late 12th century	The church, which was extended and altered through the centuries, is built in limestone, and has roofs of lead and Welsh slate. It consists of a nave with a clerestory, a north aisle, a south porch, a chancel with a gabled south organ chamber and a separately-roofed north vestry, and a west tower. The tower has buttresses, a three-light west window, slit windows, string courses, two-light bell openings, corner gargoyles, and an embattled parapet with crocketed corner pinnacles. The porch is gabled with timber framing in the gable, and contains a 12th-century doorway with three orders. The east window has three lights, and above it is a clock face.	I
Ruins of Thorpe Salvin Hall; 53.32577°N 1.21868°W		Mid to late 16th century	The ruins are in limestone, and consist of the south wall of a manor house, on a chamfered plinth with quoins. There are three storeys and nine bays, and the roof is missing. The ruins consist of round corner turrets, between which are projections for external chimney stacks and a porch, and mullioned and transomed windows. The porch has a doorway with a chamfered surround, a Tudor arched lintel and a hood mould, above which is a blocked three-light mullioned window, and in the upper floors are transomed windows and pigeon holes.	II*
Gatehouse, Thorpe Salvin Hall; 53.32558°N 1.21886°W		Mid to late 16th century	The gatehouse is in limestone with quoins and a tile roof. There are two storeys and a single bay. In the centre is a doorway with a surround of moulded quoins, a Tudor arched lintel, and a hood mould. Above it is a heraldic panel, a three-light mullioned window, and a crow-stepped gable. In the left return is an upper floor doorway.	II*
Pair of headstones 53.32467°N 1.22009°W	—	Early to mid 18th century	The headstones are in the churchyard of St Peter's Church, and are in limestone. The earlier is a double headstone with rounded heads to two panels containing inscriptions and carvings of a skull and crossbones and an hourglass. The later headstone has an inscription flanked by fluting.	II
5, 7 and 9 Little Wood Lane; 53.32370°N 1.21859°W	—	Early to mid 18th century	A row of limestone cottages with quoins and a pantile roof. There are two storeys, five bays, and a recessed bay on the right. The doorway on the left has a chamfered surround and an inscribed lintel, and the doorway on the right has a raised surround and a keystone. The windows are casements.	II
Sundial; 53.32466°N 1.22004°W		18th century (probable)	The sundial in the churchyard of St Peter's Church is in limestone, and stands on a plinth of three steps dated 1841. On the plinth is a Tuscan column with a projecting band under a sundial with a ball finial. On the plinth are inscriptions, on the sides of the sundial are carved faces, and the gnomons are missing.	II
Devil's Hole Bridge; 53.33216°N 1.21671°W		Late 18th century (probable)	The bridge crosses the Chesterfield Canal, and its arch was rebuilt in the 19th century. The bridge is in limestone and the arch was rebuilt in brick, and it consists of a single segmental arch. The wing walls curve out and end in projecting piers, and they have rectangular copings.	II
Thorpe Flight of locks 53.32724°N 1.19222°W		Late 18th century	The flight of locks on the Chesterfield Canal consists of eight locks, two of which are double and one is a triple staircase. They are in limestone with brick linings, and all are 2.1 metres (6 ft 11 in) wide.	II
Top Treble Locks and Bridge 35; 53.32873°N 1.20019°W		Late 18th century	The three-lock staircase is on the Chesterfield Canal, and the bridge, which is dated 1835, crosses the canal at the eastern end of the locks. The entry and exit walls of the locks are in stone and the sides are lined in brick, and on the south side are arched tunnels leading to an overflow channel. The bridge is in red brick with stone voussoirs, and consists of a single chamfered segmental arch with a keystone and a dated ledge above.	II
Ryton Aqueduct; 53.32529°N 1.17535°W		c. 1777	The aqueduct carries the Chesterfield Canal over the River Ryton, and it was partly reconstructed in 1946. The aqueduct is in limestone, and the south side has been rebuilt in blue brick. On the north side are three segmental arches over the river, with voussoirs and keystones. The parapet has rounded copings, and on the north wall is an inscribed plaque.	II
Canal milestone near Devil's Hole Bridge; 53.33039°N 1.21365°W		Late 18th to early 19th century	The milestone is on the Chesterfield Canal on the opposite bank from the towpath. It is in limestone, and is a round-headed slab inscribed with "16", indicating the distance to Chesterfield.	II
Canal milestone near Milestone Lock; 53.32769°N 1.19428°W		Late 18th to early 19th century	The milestone is on the Chesterfield Canal on the opposite bank from the towpath. It is in limestone, and is a round-headed slab inscribed with "17", indicating the distance to Chesterfield.	II
Thorpe Bridge; 53.33427°N 1.22395°W		c. 1840	The bridge, which crosses the Chesterfield Canal, is in red brick with limestone voussoirs. It consists of a single segmental arch with a keystone. The abutment walls curve out and end at projecting piers.	II
Pudding Dike Bridge; 53.32768°N 1.20762°W		Mid to late 19th century	The bridge, which crosses the Chesterfield Canal, is in red brick with limestone springing stones and copings. It consists of a single segmental arch with brick voussoirs, and parapets with rectangular copings. The abutment walls sweep out and end at rounded piers.	II
