= Brookhouse, South Yorkshire =

Hamlet in South Yorkshire, England

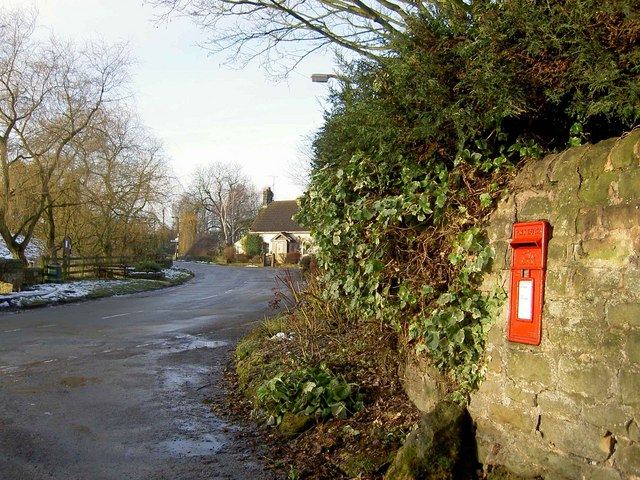
Main Street, Brookhouse

Brookhouse is a hamlet in the civil parish of Laughton en le Morthen, in the Rotherham district lying to the south-east of Rotherham, South Yorkshire, England.

The hamlet of Slade Hooton is situated directly east of Brookhouse. Brookhouse Colliery, located south-west, near Swallownest was named for the hamlet.
