= Listed buildings in Ravenfield =

Ravenfield is a civil parish in the Metropolitan Borough of Rotherham, South Yorkshire, England. The parish contains nine listed buildings that are recorded in the National Heritage List for England. Of these, one is listed at Grade II*, the middle of the three grades, and the others are at Grade II, the lowest grade. The parish contains the village of Ravenfield and the surrounding countryside. Four of the listed buildings are houses along the main street, and to the north of the village is a church. The other listed buildings are further to the north, and are associated with Ravenfield Hall, which was destroyed by fire in 1963.

== Key ==
Grade	Criteria
II*	Particularly important buildings of more than special interest
II	Buildings of national importance and special interest

== Buildings ==
Name and location	Photograph	Date	Notes	Grade
3 and 5 Main Street; 53.45043°N 1.27095°W	—	16th century (probable)	A house, later divided, it has a timber framed core, and was extended and encased in sandstone in the 17th century. It has quoins, a roof of pantile and stone slate, two storeys, three bays, and outshuts on the front and the rear. On the front is a blocked doorway with a quoined surround, and at the rear is a doorway with a chamfered quoined surround. The windows are casements with some mullions removed.	II
Oak House; 53.45019°N 1.27133°W	—	1682	A farmhouse that was later extended, it is in sandstone, with quoins, and a pantile roof with coped gables and shaped kneelers. There are two storeys and attics, and four bays, with a gable over the third bay, and a rear outshut. The doorway is in the third bay and has a moulded surround, and in the added left bay is a doorway with a keystone. The windows are casements, and over the upper floor window in the third bay is an inscribed and dated panel.	II
Bridge House; 53.45213°N 1.27121°W	—	Mid 18th century	A sandstone house with quoins and a Welsh slate roof. There are two storeys and an attic, and two bays. The central doorway has a moulded surround, and the windows are casements with keystones.	II
Entrance gateway and railings, Ravenfield Hall Farm; 53.45513°N 1.27469°W		Mid 18th century	The gateway was designed by John Carr, and consists of double gates and side gates, with inner and outer gate piers. The piers are in sandstone, the inner pair with a plinth, a band-rusticated shaft, a triglyph frieze, a cornice, a block with paterae, a pedimented cornice with an acanthus cup, and a pineapple finial. The outer piers are similar, but smaller, and have ball finials with a Greek key band. Quadrant walls with railings run from the outer piers and end in piers with sunken panels and cornices, one with a vase finial. The railings and gates are in wrought iron.	II
St James' Church; 53.45361°N 1.26973°W		1755–56	The church was designed by John Carr, and is in sandstone with a Welsh slate roof. It consists of a three-bay nave, a narrower east apse, and a west tower arising from the west bay of the nave. At the west end is a doorway with an architrave and a cornice on consoles, above which is a two-light window with ogee-headed lights. On the west front of the tower is a clock face in a shaped panel, over which are two-light bell openings with ogee heads, a cornice with spiked pinnacles, and a spirelet with a concave-sided base and a ball finial. On the sides of the tower are cruciform slits in quatrefoils. The nave has coped parapets with corner obelisks, and contains two-light windows with Y-tracery and ogee headed lights.	II*
Farm building north of Ravenfield Hall Farmhouse; 53.45700°N 1.27411°W		Mid to late 18th century	A combination farm building, later converted for residential use, it is in sandstone with quoins and hipped slate roofs. The building consists of a central three-storey tower flanked by two-storey five-bay wings. The left wing was originally a barn and the right wing a shelter with a hayloft above. The central tower projects, and has a round-headed window within a round-arched panel, a round-arched recess, a band, a blind oculus, an eaves cornice, and a finial. The former barn has a large entrance, slit vents and oculi, and the former shelter has arched panels in the ground floor and rectangular panels above.	II
Stable block northeast of Ravenfield Hall Farmhouse; 53.45596°N 1.27345°W		Mid to late 18th century	The stable block was designed by John Carr, and is in sandstone on a plinth, with quoins, a continuous impost band, a modillion eaves cornice, and a hipped Welsh slate roof. There are two storeys and nine bays, the middle three bays projecting under a pediment with banded ball finials. In the centre is a round-arched carriage entrance with an archivolt. The windows in the ground floor are casements, some in round-arched recesses, and in the upper floor they are sashes. At the rear are external steps and seven oculi.	II
Wall and farm buildings north of Ravenfield Hall Farmhouse; 53.45637°N 1.27457°W	—	Mid to late 18th century	The wall that surrounds a trapezoidal-shaped enclosure is in sandstone and brick. The roadside section is between 3 metres (9.8 ft) and 4 metres (13 ft) high, and has plain coping. The eastern section has a single-storey range, and includes a two-bay carriage house and cowhouses of five and six bays. These buildings contain segmental arches, impost bands, eaves bands, and hipped tiled roofs.	II
2–14 Main Street; 53.45082°N 1.27122°W		Early to mid 19th century	A row of seven cottages in sandstone with Welsh slate roofs. They are in two ranges, the right range lower, and have two storeys and ten bays. Most of the windows are casements, and there are some horizontally-sliding sash windows.	II
