= Brampton-en-le-Morthen =

Village in South Yorkshire, England

Coordinates: 53.38°N 1.27°W

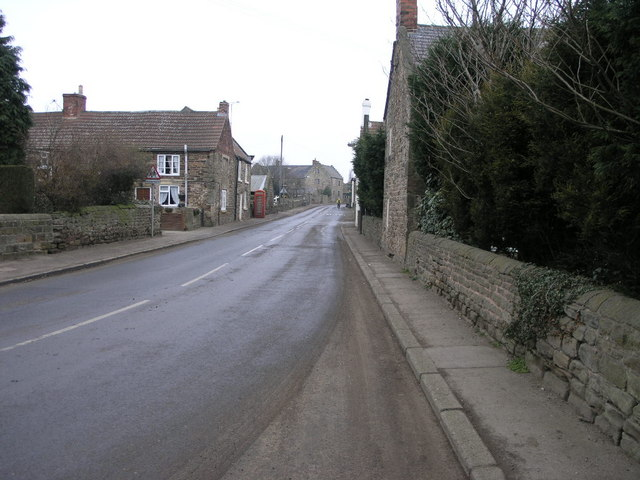
- View towards the village

- Location within South Yorkshire
- Population: 80
- Civil parish: Thurcroft
- Metropolitan borough: Rotherham
- Metropolitan county: South Yorkshire
- Region: Yorkshire and the Humber
- Country: England
- Sovereign state: United Kingdom
- Post town: SHEFFIELD
- Postcode district: S66
- Dialling code: 01709
- Police: South Yorkshire
- Fire: South Yorkshire
- Ambulance: Yorkshire
- UK Parliament: Rother Valley

Brampton-en-le-Morthen is a dormitory village in the civil parish of Thurcroft, in the Rotherham district, lying to the south of Rotherham, South Yorkshire, England.

The village is located directly south-west of Thurcroft, west of Laughton en le Morthen and south-east of Morthen and Whiston.

== History ==
The name Brampton derives from the Old English brōmtūn meaning 'settlement growing with broom'.

Brampton en le Morthen was formerly a township in the parish of Treeton, from 1866 Brampton en le Morthen was a civil parish in its own right until 1 April 1923 when it was abolished and merged with Treeton parish. In 1911, the parish had a population of 148.
