= Listed buildings in Whiston, South Yorkshire =

Whiston is a civil parish in the Metropolitan Borough of Rotherham, South Yorkshire, England. The parish contains 18 listed buildings that are recorded in the National Heritage List for England. Of these, three are listed at Grade II*, the middle of the three grades, and the others are at Grade II, the lowest grade. The parish contains the villages of Whiston and Morthen and the surrounding countryside. Most of the listed buildings are houses and associated structures, farmhouses and farm buildings. The other listed buildings include a church, a headstone in the churchyard, a cross base, a set of stocks, and two mileposts.

== Key ==
Grade	Criteria
II*	Particularly important buildings of more than special interest
II	Buildings of national importance and special interest

== Buildings ==
Name and location	Photograph	Date	Notes	Grade
Church of St Mary Magdalene; 53.40518°N 1.32303°W		12th century	The church has been altered and extended through the centuries, and in 1881–83 John Oldrid Scott replaced the chancel and the north aisle in Perpendicular style. The church is built in sandstone, and has roofs of Welsh slate and lead. The church consists of a nave, a south aisle, a south porch, a chancel, a north vestry, and a southwest tower. The tower has diagonal buttresses, a west lancet window, a string course with gargoyles, a frieze with panels, an embattled parapet with crocketed pinnacles, and a tiled pyramidal roof with a weathervane.	II*
Whiston Hall Barn; 53.40544°N 1.32861°W		13th or 14th century (probable)	A timber framed barn that was extended in the 16th century and encased in the 17th century. It is in sandstone with a thatched roof, and has a single storey, eight bays, and aisles. A polygonal horse engine house was added to the rear in the 19th century.	II*
Cross base 53.39905°N 1.28474°W	—	Late medieval (probable)	The remains of the cross are in sandstone. The base is square and tapering with chamfered corners, and the shaft is also square and tapering.	II
The Poplars; 53.39561°N 1.31271°W	—	Late 15th to early 16th century	A house with a timber framed core, encased and rebuilt in the 17th century, and later altered. It is in roughcast sandstone with a Welsh slate roof. There are two storeys and five bays. The windows are a mix of sashes and casements. On the left return is a massive chimney stack, and internally there is remaining timber framing.	II
Whiston Hall; 53.40590°N 1.32848°W	—	Early 16th century	A manor house later used for other purposes, it has a timber framed core, and was encased in the 17th century and extended in the 18th century. It is in sandstone on a plinth, with quoins, a floor band, and a tile roof with coped gables, shaped kneelers, and a finial. There are two storeys and partial cellars, a main range of five bays, a cross-wing on the left, and a rear single-bay rear wing recessed on the left. The doorway has an architrave and a hood mould. The windows in the main range are mullioned, and to the left of the doorway is a sash window. The cross-wing contains casement windows, and in the rear wing are mullioned windows. Inside, there is some exposed timber framing.	II
Grange Farmhouse; 53.39920°N 1.28632°W	—	16th century	The farmhouse has a timber framed core, and it was encased in the 18th century. It is in sandstone with quoins and a roof of Welsh slate and pantile. There are two storeys, and an L-shaped plan, consisting of a main range, a cross-wing projecting on the left, and a rear outshut on the right with a porch in the angle. On the front is a doorway and a horizontally-sliding sash window, and most of the other windows are casements. Inside, there is exposed timber framing.	II
Farm building, Guilthwaite Hall Farm; 53.39353°N 1.32548°W	—	Mid 17th century	A combination farm building is red sandstone on a chamfered plinth, with quoins, and a Welsh slate roof with moulded gable copings, shaped kneelers, and finial bases. There are two storeys and a loft, and five bays. The doorway on the left has monolithic jambs and a deep lintel, to the right is a doorway with a bonded surround and a lintel with a keystone, and over all the ground floor openings is a continuous hood mould. External steps lead to an upper floor doorway, and there is a hatch.	II
Lawns Farmhouse; 53.39849°N 1.28559°W	—	Mid 17th century	The farmhouse is in sandstone, with quoins, and a pantile roof with square-cut gable copings and kneelers. There are two storeys and a partial cellar, and five bays. The openings include a doorway with a quoined surround and a Tudor arched lintel, another doorway with a quoined surround and a plain lintel, and casement windows.	II
Stable and granary south of Whiston Hall; 53.40569°N 1.32869°W	—	Late 17th century	The farm building, later converted for other uses, is in sandstone, with quoins, and square-cut gable copings with shaped kneelers. There are two storeys, and an outshut to the northeast. In the upper floor is a doorway with a quoined surround and an arched lintel. Elsewhere are other openings, including blocked vents.	II
Morthen Hall; 53.39996°N 1.28129°W		Early 18th century	A country house that was later extended, it is in sandstone on a plinth, with quoins, a floor band, a pediment over the middle five bays containing an oculus in the tympanum, balustrades over the outer bays, and a hipped Welsh slate roof. There are two storeys and attics, a symmetrical front of seven bays, and later lower three-bay side wings. The central doorway has a shouldered and eared architrave, and above it is a panel and a segmental pediment. The windows are sashes with moulded surrounds, and the window above the doorway has an architrave, a console-shaped keystone, and a cornice. At the rear is a round-arched stair window with a rusticated quoined surround.	II*
Headstone; 53.40512°N 1.32348°W	—	c. 1736	The headstone in the churchyard of the Church of St Mary Magdalene is to the memory of Rebekah Cutt. It is in sandstone, and consists of a thick slab with a shaped head. On the headstone is an inscription, and carvings in relief of knotted swags and skull and cross bones, flanked by Doric pilasters surmounted by vases.	II
The Heights Farmhouse; 53.39667°N 1.31272°W	—	Mid 18th century	The farmhouse is in sandstone, with quoins, and a pantile roof with coped gables and shaped kneelers. There are two storeys, three bays, and a rear wing on the left. The doorway has a bonded surround and a plain lintel, and the windows are 20th-century casements.	II
The Mews; 53.39968°N 1.28172°W	—	Mid 18th century	A stable block to which a coach house was added in the 19th century, and later converted into a house. It is in sandstone on a plinth, with quoins, sill bands, an eaves cornice, and a tile roof with coped gables and shaped kneelers. There are two storeys, and six bays. In the former stable range on the left are four round-arched doorways with quoined surrounds, and casement windows. The former coach house contains two segmental-arched carriage entrances and mullioned windows. On the left return is a two-storey bay window with a cornice and a hipped roof.	II
Village stocks 53.40504°N 1.32350°W		1798	The stocks are to the west of St Mary's Church. They consist of two tapering square sandstone posts, with rebates for the wooden boards. The right post is dated, and the central part is protected by an iron cage.	II
Oak Cottage; 53.39951°N 1.28208°W	—	Early 19th century	A barn and cottage converted into a house, it is in sandstone, with a quoin strip on the left, and a pantile roof with square-cut gables and kneelers. There are two storeys and five bays, and the windows are 20th-century casements. In the left bay is a window in an infilled segmental arch, the second bay contains a porch, and in the fourth bay is a segmental archway with a quoined surround. The left return contains an eaves band, in the ground floor is an oriel window, above it is a round-arched recess, and in the outer bays on each floor are oculi.	II
Ha-ha, gates, gate piers and wall, Morthen Hall; 53.39961°N 1.28105°W	—	Early 19th century (probable)	The gates are in wrought iron and the other structures are in sandstone. The retaining wall of the ha-ha has rounded copings and is about 16 metres (52 ft) long. At each end are rusticated gate piers with pyramidal caps, and double gates. The walls continue to link with taller garden walls that have ball finials at the junctions.	II
Milepost near Guilthwaite Grange; 53.39596°N 1.32422°W		Second half of 19th century	The milepost is on the east side of Pleasley road (A618 road). It is in cast iron, fixed against a wall, and has a triangular section and a rounded top. On the top is inscribed "ROTHERHAM & PLEASLEY ROAD" and "WHISTON", and on the sides are the distances to Mansfield, Pleasley, Clowne and Rotherham.	II
Milepost, West Bawtry Road; 53.40616°N 1.33559°W		Second half of 19th century	The milepost is on the north side of West Bawtry road (A631 road). It consists of a gritstone pillar with cast iron overlay, and has a triangular section and a rounded top. On the top is inscribed "BAWTRY & TINSLEY ROAD" and "WHISTON", and on the sides are the distances to Bawtry, Bawtry Moor, Tickhill, Sheffield, and Tinsley.	II
