= Bernard Caulfield (judge) =

British barrister and High Court judge

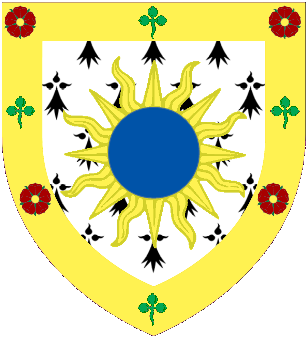
Arms displayed at Lincoln's Inn

Sir Bernard Caulfield (24 April 1914 – 17 October 1994) was a British barrister and High Court judge who served in the Queen's Bench Division from 1968 to 1989. Known for his verbal floridness in court, he is perhaps best remembered for presiding over Jeffrey Archer's libel action against the Daily Star in 1987, which later led to Archer's conviction and imprisonment for perjury.

== Early life and legal career ==
Bernard Caulfield was the youngest son of John Caulfield of St Helens, and Catherine Quinn. He was educated at St Francis Xavier's College, Liverpool and Liverpool University, graduating with an LL.B. in 1938 and an LL.M. in 1940, qualifying as a solicitor the same year. He was called up for military service the same year, and served in the Royal Army Ordnance Corps, reaching the rank of Major. On returning to civilian life in 1946, he transferred to the Bar, and he was called to the Bar by Lincoln's Inn in 1947. He joined the Midland Circuit in 1949 and was appointed a Queen's Counsel in 1961.

Caulfield was Recorder of Coventry from 1963 to 1968 and Leader of the Midland Circuit from 1965 to 1968.

== Judicial career ==
Caulfield was appointed to the High Court of Justice in 1968 on the recommendation of Lord Gardiner, the Labour lord chancellor and a close colleague at the Bar, with whom he is thought to have shared political sympathies. He received the customary knighthood the same year and was assigned to the Queen's Bench Division. He spent almost his entire judicial career on circuit, mostly on the Northern Circuit, of which he was the presiding judge from 1976 to 1980. His infrequent London sittings were thought to be a major factor in foreclosing promotion to the Court of Appeal.

On the bench, Caulfield was famous for his florid language, particularly in summing-ups.

=== Archer libel trial ===
In 1987 he presided over Jeffrey Archer's libel action against tabloid the Daily Star, which had published a story alleging that Archer had paid for sex with the prostitute Monica Coghlan. The description Caulfield gave of Mrs Archer in his summing-up speech to the jury, heavily in favour of Archer, acquired a certain notoriety:

Remember Mary Archer in the witness-box. Your vision of her probably will never disappear. Has she elegance? Has she fragrance? Would she have, without the strain of this trial, radiance? How would she appeal? Has she had a happy married life? Has she been able to enjoy, rather than endure, her husband Jeffrey?

The judge then went on to say of Jeffrey Archer:

Is he in need of cold, unloving, rubber-insulated sex in a seedy hotel round about quarter to one on a Tuesday morning after an evening at the Caprice?

Explaining the payment to Coghlan as the action of a philanthropist rather than that of a guilty man, Archer won the case and was awarded £500,000 damages, but in July 2001 was convicted of perjury in relation to the evidence he gave at the trial. He received four years in prison. Caulfield was spared the embarrassment of seeing this, having died in October 1994.

=== Other notable trials ===
Among his other notable cases, in 1984 he tried the burglar and rapist Malcolm Fairley at St Albans Crown Court. Describing Fairley as "a decadent advertisement for evil pornographers", Caulfield gave him six life sentences.
