= Thorpe Salvin =

Village and a civil parish in South Yorkshire, England

Coordinates: 53.325°N 1.2167°W

- Village and Civil Parish
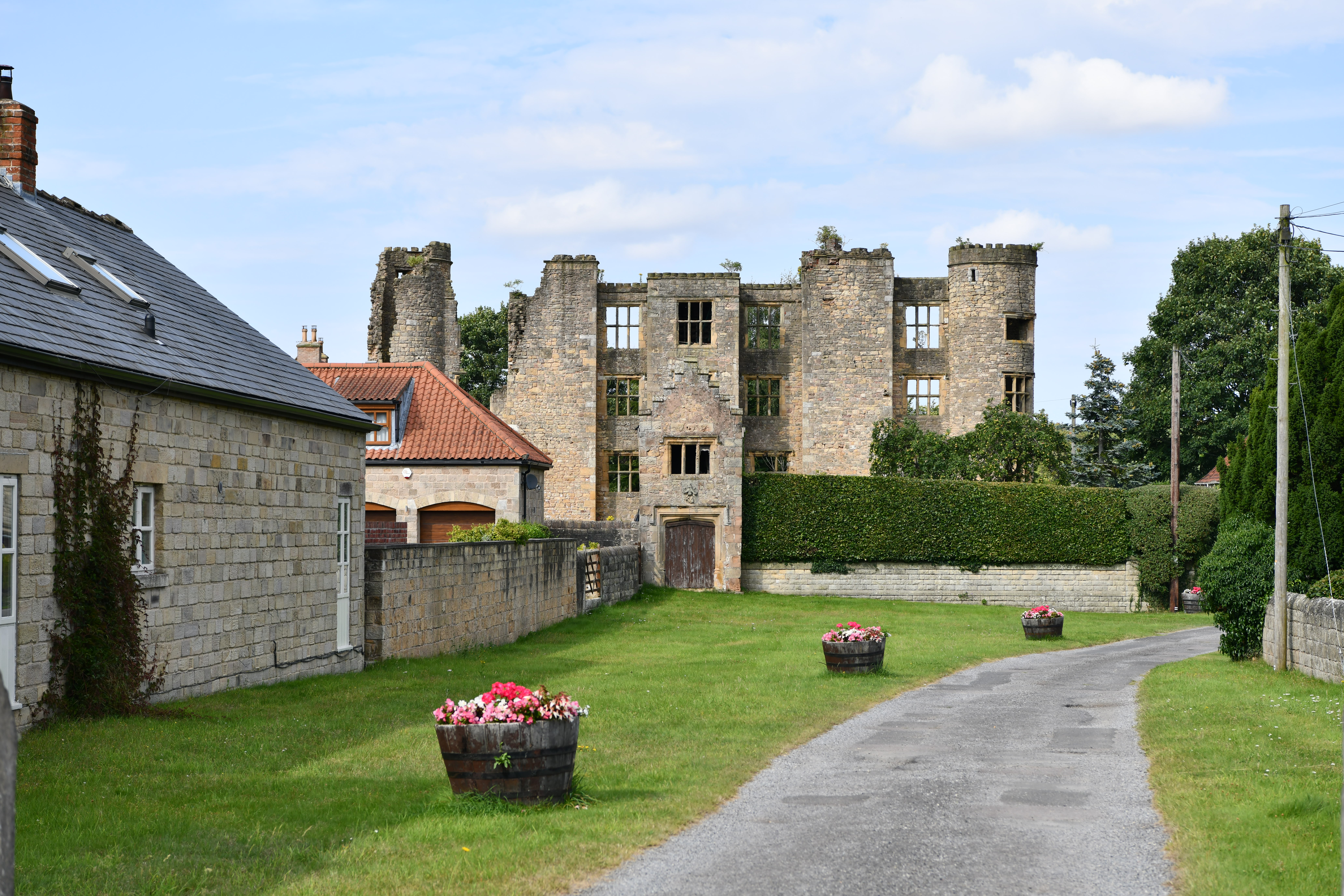
- Old Hall

- Location within South Yorkshire
- Population: 476 (2011)
- Civil parish: Thorpe Salvin
- Metropolitan borough: Rotherham
- Metropolitan county: South Yorkshire
- Region: Yorkshire and the Humber
- Country: England
- Sovereign state: United Kingdom
- Post town: WORKSOP
- Postcode district: S80
- Dialling code: 01909
- Police: South Yorkshire
- Fire: South Yorkshire
- Ambulance: Yorkshire
- UK Parliament: Rother Valley

Thorpe Salvin is a village and a civil parish in the Metropolitan Borough of Rotherham in South Yorkshire, England, on the border with Nottinghamshire. It lies between Worksop and Harthill, and is located at an elevation of around 110 metres above sea level. At the 2011 Census, it had a population of 476, down from 502 in 2001.

The rectangular-towered parish church of St Peter, a predominantly 12th-century structure with 15th-century additions, is emblazoned with Norman carvings, and has been nominated among England's 1,000 best churches. It was Grade I listed in 1966. The village has a public house, the Parish Oven.

== History ==
The name Thorpe derives from the Norse for an outlying farmstead, while Salvin refers to 13th century lord of the manor Ralph Salvain. There are earlier references to the settlement though, including a mention in the Domesday Book as Rynkenild Thorp, part of Roger de Busli's Laughton en le Morthen estate. This name refers to the settlement's place on the Roman road of Rynkenild Street, now Packman Lane. Within the bounds of the parish is Netherthorpe Airfield which has been active since 1933.

The noted Benedictine scholar and royal chaplain Serenus de Cressy was born here in about 1605.

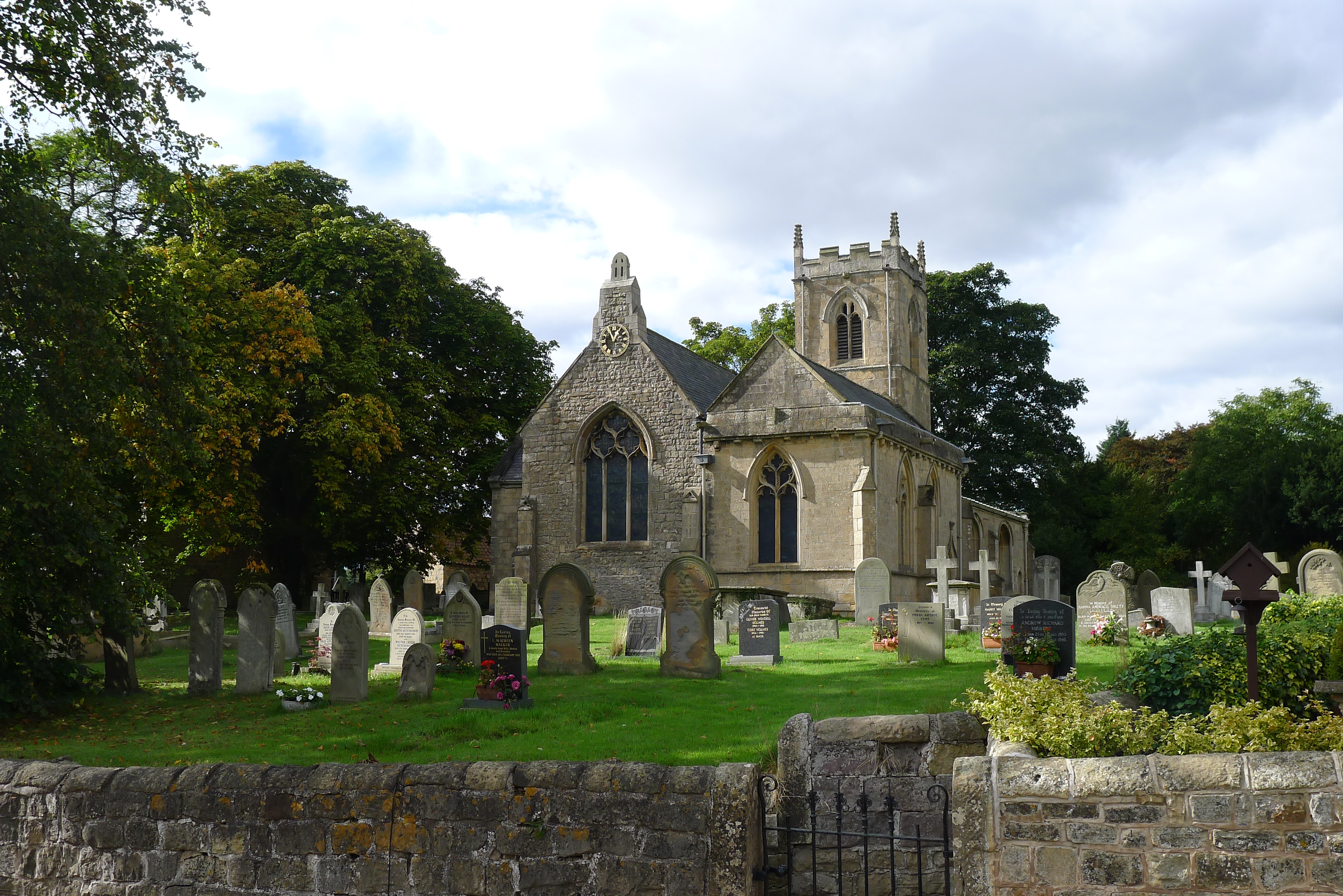
St Peter's Church

=== Thorpe Hall ===
Thorpe Salvin contains the ruins of Thorpe Hall, a manor house designed and built by Robert Smythson in 1570. It was built on the site of the previous manor house which was the residence of an earlier lord of the manor, Sir Bryan Sandford, Knight, who fought for Henry Tudor at the Battle of Bosworth Field, 19 August 1485. Sir Bryan was one of many who defected from Richard III's army just days before the battle. For more information about this and the Sanford Family of Co.Yorks and Virginia, see the Sanford Index, Revised, by Charles M. Marsteller.

In 1636, the hall was bought by Edward Osborne. When his descendant Thomas Osborne became Duke of Leeds, he moved out to a grander property in Kiveton Park, and the hall fell into disuse. It was partially demolished in the 1820s, with only the south front now remaining. It is Grade II* Listed.

== See also ==
- Listed buildings in Thorpe Salvin
