= Carr, South Yorkshire =

Hamlet in South Yorkshire, England

Coordinates: 53.407°N 1.233°W

Carr
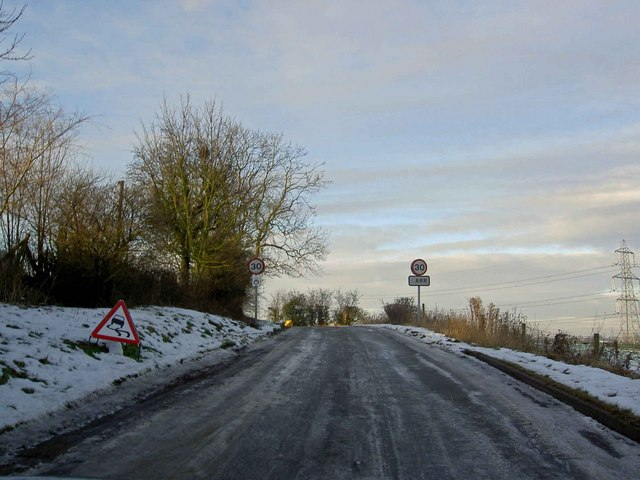
- Entering Carr

- Location within South Yorkshire
- OS grid reference: SK5190
- Civil parish: Laughton-en-le-Morthen
- Metropolitan borough: Rotherham
- Metropolitan county: South Yorkshire
- Region: Yorkshire and the Humber
- Country: England
- Sovereign state: United Kingdom
- Post town: SHEFFIELD
- Postcode district: S66
- Dialling code: 01909
- Police: South Yorkshire
- Fire: South Yorkshire
- Ambulance: Yorkshire
- UK Parliament: Rother Valley

Carr is a hamlet in the civil parish of Laughton-en-le-Morthen, in the Rotherham district lying to the south of Rotherham, South Yorkshire, England.

== See also ==
- Listed buildings in Laughton en le Morthen
