= Listed buildings in Rotherham (East Ward) =

Rotherham East is a ward in the Metropolitan Borough of Rotherham, South Yorkshire, England. The ward contains three listed buildings that are recorded in the National Heritage List for England. All the listed buildings are designated at Grade II, the lowest of the three grades, which is applied to "buildings of national importance and special interest". The ward is to the east of the centre of Rotherham, and the listed buildings consist of a set of gate piers and walls, a milepost, and a church.

== Buildings ==
Name and location	Photograph	Date	Notes
Gate piers and walls, Eastwood House; 53.43408°N 1.34168°W	—	c. 1786	The gate piers and walls at the entrance to Eastwood House, which was demolished in 1928, are in sandstone. The walls are curved on a plinth, with square-cut copings, and they link the gate piers to less elaborate end piers. Each pier has a rusticated shaft with a sunken panel, and fluting under a band. The gate piers have a frieze with paterae and a cornice, and are surmounted by carved bowls; on the left pier is inscribed "EASTWOOD", and on the right "HOUSE". The end piers have domed tops.
Milepost; 53.43647°N 1.33426°W		Early 19th century (probable)	The milepost is on the south side of Doncaster Road in front of No. 193. It consists of a sandstone pillar with a rectangular cast iron plaque inscribed with distances to Rotherham, Sheffield, and Doncaster (the names abbreviated).
St Antony Coptic Orthodox Church; 53.43411°N 1.34897°W		1872–74	Originally St Stephen's Church, the steeple was added in 1910, and the chancel was extended in 1912. The church is built in sandstone with a Welsh slate roof, and is in Gothic Revival style. It consists of a nave with a clerestory, north and south aisles, a northwest porch, a chancel with a north vestry and a separately-roofed extension to the south, and a southwest steeple. The steeple has a tower with angle buttresses surmounted by gablets and a west door with a pointed arch, above which are lancet windows, two-light bell openings, a corbel table and a string course with corner gargoyles, a parapet with moulded copings, and a recessed octagonal spire with crockets. In the angle of the porch is an octagonal bell turret with a spirelet.
