= Listed buildings in Rotherham (Sitwell Ward) =

Sitwell Ward is a ward in the Metropolitan Borough of Rotherham, South Yorkshire, England. The ward contains four listed buildings that are recorded in the National Heritage List for England. All the listed buildings are designated at Grade II, the lowest of the three grades, which is applied to "buildings of national importance and special interest". The ward is a suburb to the southeast of the centre of Rotherham and is residential. The listed buildings consist of two mileposts, a large house, and an open air school.

== Buildings ==
| Name and location | Photograph | Date | Notes |
|---|---|---|---|
| Milepost in front of 229 Moorgate Road; 53.40786°N 1.33490°W | | Second half 19th century | The milepost is on the northeast side of Moorgate Road (A618 road). It consists of a gritstone pillar with cast iron overlay, and has a triangular section and a rounded top. On the top is inscribed "ROTHERHAM & PLEASLEY ROAD" and "WHISTON ", and on the sides are the distances to Mansfield, Pleasley, Clowne, and Rotherham. |
| Milepost in front of 214 Wickersley Road; 53.41853°N 1.31640°W | | Second half 19th century | The milepost is on the south side of Wickersley Road (A6021 road). It consists of a gritstone pillar with cast iron overlay, and has a triangular section and a rounded top. On the top is inscribed "ROTHERHAM & BARNBY MOOR ROAD" and "WHISTON", and on the sides are the distances to Rotherham, Barnby Moor, Bawtry, and Tickhill. |
| Swinden House; 53.41543°N 1.33463°W | — | c. 1880 | A large house, the ground floor is in sandstone, the upper parts are in red brick, it has terracotta dressings and a red tile roof, and is in Jacobethan style. There are two storeys and attics, and a garden front of five bays. The front is on a plinth, and has quoins, string courses, a dentilled cornice, and balustrades. The outer bays project and contain two-storey bay windows, above which are ball finials, and coped gables with iron finials. The central bay has a smaller gable with a finial, and the windows are mullioned and transomed. The round-arched doorway is in the left return and has panelled pilasters, carved voussoirs, a keystone, spandrels, capitals, and a frieze. |
| Newman School; 53.40825°N 1.33293°W | — | 1939 | An open air school in International Modern style built in rendered concrete with asphalt roofs. There are seven south-facing classrooms, linked at the rear by a curved corridor. The classrooms are glazed on three sides, and have a continuous canopy and clerestories. To the right is an administration and service block, and a taller assembly hall. |
