= Murder of Jeffrey Howe =

2009 murder in England

Jeffrey Howe (1959/1960 – 8 March 2009) was a British businessman who was murdered by Stephen T. Marshall.

His dismembered body parts were scattered across Hertfordshire and Leicestershire, leading to him being known in the press as Jigsaw Man.

Marshall became known as the Jigsaw Killer. Marshall initially pleaded "not guilty" to murder, but he changed his plea to "guilty" and was sentenced to life imprisonment in February 2010.

== Background ==
Jeffrey Howe, 49, was a kitchen salesman. He had worked around the country and had been a chef in Italy, and was a Manchester United football supporter. His brother described him as "a jovial, charming character who had a heart of gold and would get on with anyone." He had twice been married. Neighbours said that he was aggressive and argued about children playing, and said they had not seen him or his two Jaguar cars for about six months, believing that he rented out his ground floor two-bedroom flat.

Stephen Marshall, 38, was a body builder and personal trainer, of Ayot Path, Borehamwood, Hertfordshire, and formerly of Park Street, St Albans, where he once owned a gym. He was a work associate and lodger of Howe's at his flat in Southgate, London. Marshall had lived at the Southgate flat since November 2008 after Howe, said to be his 'drinking buddy', wanted to help him out. He stayed without paying rent along with his girlfriend Sarah Bush, 21, from Southgate, who was a sex worker. They stole Howe's food and refused to leave after promising to do so, which he complained about to a friend at Christmas time. They fraudulently claimed housing benefit by forging his signature, saying he was leasing the property to them.

Sarah Bush met Marshall when he hired her as a prostitute. He made her change her name from Sara. She spent most of her childhood in care, and has two children. Her first baby, which she had when she had just turned 15, died aged 10 days.

== Murder ==
Howe was murdered on the night of 8–9 March 2009. He was stabbed twice in the back with a 4-inch blade, one of the wounds puncturing his lung. Howe may have been alive for up to an hour after he was stabbed. Marshall "skillfully and cleanly" removed Howe's limbs, which Home Office pathologist Simon Poole estimated would have taken at least 12 hours.

After the murder, Marshall and Bush used Howe's bank account to buy a laptop, shoes, takeaways, and other consumer goods and food. They set up an account with online retailer Littlewoods, some of the purchases being made on a computer in St. Albans library. They wrote forged cheques to clear his account. They sold some of his belongings, including his mobile phone, furniture, and his Saab car, which was sold on eBay. They said to Howe's friend that he had "packed up and left." Howe's adopted brother John visited the flat on 28 March and was told by Bush that Howe had not collected rent for a while and had left with his belongings.

== Investigation ==
Detective Superintendent Michael Hanlon from the Bedfordshire and Hertfordshire Major Crime Unit led the investigation, named Operation Abnet and involving up to 100 officers. To aid the investigation, police revealed that the victim was overweight, suffered from eczema, had bleached skin pigmentation on his legs, a fungal infection on his toenails, and was missing two front teeth. They released a picture of the suitcase in which the torso was found. The police decided to keep details of the dismemberment from the public to avoid panic.

A friend of Howe had visited the flat at the end of January 2009 and found the couple living there. After trying to phone him and hearing he had gone missing, she reported him as a missing person on 15 March. Howe's mother, who usually received calls from him several times a week, rang the incident room some time before 21 April to report Howe missing. Two police officers went to the flat at 11:30 on the morning of 16 March and forced entry when there was no answer, searching all the rooms. There was no visible sign of blood, and Howe's passport was on a coffee table. When questioned by police, Marshall and Bush said that as far as they knew he was alive. The police used dental records to identify Howe from his remains and discovered that Marshall had lived close to where the torso was found. Police arrested the couple at the flat in Southgate, north London on 21 April. The arresting officer said that "[Marshall] was very, very nervous, jittery, his leg was shaking. Sarah Bush was uncomfortable, and at that point I knew that Jeffrey Howe was going to be our victim." Taken to a station in Hertfordshire for questioning, Bush told police that Marshall suffered "mood swings" and that she had been planning to leave him. Marshall gave "no comment" to police questioning. Howe was publicly named as the victim on 23 April.

Blood was found in the bedroom, bathroom, under the carpet, and in Howe's car after it was recovered. Green fibres from a T-shirt in Marshall's bedroom matched fibres on duct tape used to wrap Howe's body parts. The journey of Marshall and Bush to Leicestershire was traced from CCTV and Automatic number plate recognition.

The IPCC is supervising a Metropolitan Police Service review of procedure of how Howe's missing person case was handled.

=== Discovery of his body ===
- 22 March. A left leg with the foot attached was found in a lay-by on the A507 in Cottered, Hertfordshire, in a green holdall. A murder investigation was launched.
- 29 March. A left forearm, dismembered at the elbow and wrist, was found on a grass verge along Drovers Lane, in Wheathampstead, Hertfordshire.
- 31 March. A head was unearthed by a farmer in a cattle pen in a field in Asfordby, Leicestershire. The flesh had been removed and the eyes, ears, tongue and neck had been cut off.
- 7 April. A right leg was found in a holdall near the A10 Puckeridge bypass in Hertfordshire by a driver.
- 11 April. A torso, right arm and upper left arm were discovered in a ditch by a walker near High Cross, Hertfordshire inside a green suitcase, the same brand as the holdall.
- His hands have not been found, though Bush has said they were buried in Epping Forest.

== Trial ==
The trial began on 12 January 2010 and was held at St Albans Crown Court, with Stuart Trimmer QC prosecuting.

Marshall initially denied murdering Howe, claiming that Bush murdered him and that he only helped to dismember and dispose of the body, admitting counts of perverting the course of justice and intending to prevent a coroner from holding an inquest. Bush denied all charges.

The court heard that Marshall previously threatened to "get rid of" Bush's previous partner in Epping Forest, and to "dispose of" another woman. He had boasted to her of having "considerable experience of disposing of bodies".

She said the first time he did so he was nauseated and took cocaine to cope, becoming an addict. A witness said that when working for the Adams crime family, Marshall had used a meat cleaver, meat knives, a hacksaw, or a chainsaw to cut up bodies.

A friend of Bush told the court that when drunk, Bush confessed to friends that she helped Marshall kill Howe after Marshall stabbed him in the back, placing a pillow over Howe's face to stop the noise. Another friend of Bush, Danielle Matthews, said Bush told her she had seen the murder and that Howe had laughed when Marshall had earlier threatened to kill him unless he left the flat.

On 29 January, three weeks into the trial, Marshall changed his plea to guilty of murder. He was sentenced to life imprisonment on 1 February, for a minimum of 36 years.

The judge, Jeremy Cooke, ruled that little credit could be given for the change of plea given the overwhelming evidence. He dismissed Marshall's claim that he was on the verge of drug-induced suicide when he stabbed his victim in bed. Marshall is ineligible for parole until 2046.

Bush also changed her plea to guilty on 1 February, and was sentenced to three years and nine months for perverting the course of justice by helping Marshall take Howe's head to Leicestershire and was given a concurrent sentence of two years and three months for giving false information about Howe's whereabouts, although she was acquitted of murder. She served 45 months in prison.

After the trial it was revealed that Marshall had previous convictions for criminal damage, assault, battery, cocaine possession, and possessing a firearm. He had attacked his first wife in 2003, and was arrested on suspicion of murdering Minesh Nagrecha in 1996 when his burnt body was found. He was never charged, instead appearing as a witness. Bush had two prior cautions for possession of cannabis and assault.

Marshall was refused leave to appeal in October 2010. A challenge to the length of his sentence was turned down by two Court of Appeal judges in November 2010.

=== Previous bodies ===
Via his lawyer, Peter Doyle, Marshall admitted in court on 1 February to dismembering four more bodies between 1995 and 1998 and disposing of them in Epping Forest, when he worked for the Adams crime family as a doorman for a London nightclub. This admission was to the surprise of police, but Marshall refused to give them details of the other victims.
