= HM Prison Hull =

Prison in Hull, East Riding of Yorkshire, England

Coordinates: 53°44′52″N 0°17′45″W

HMP Hull
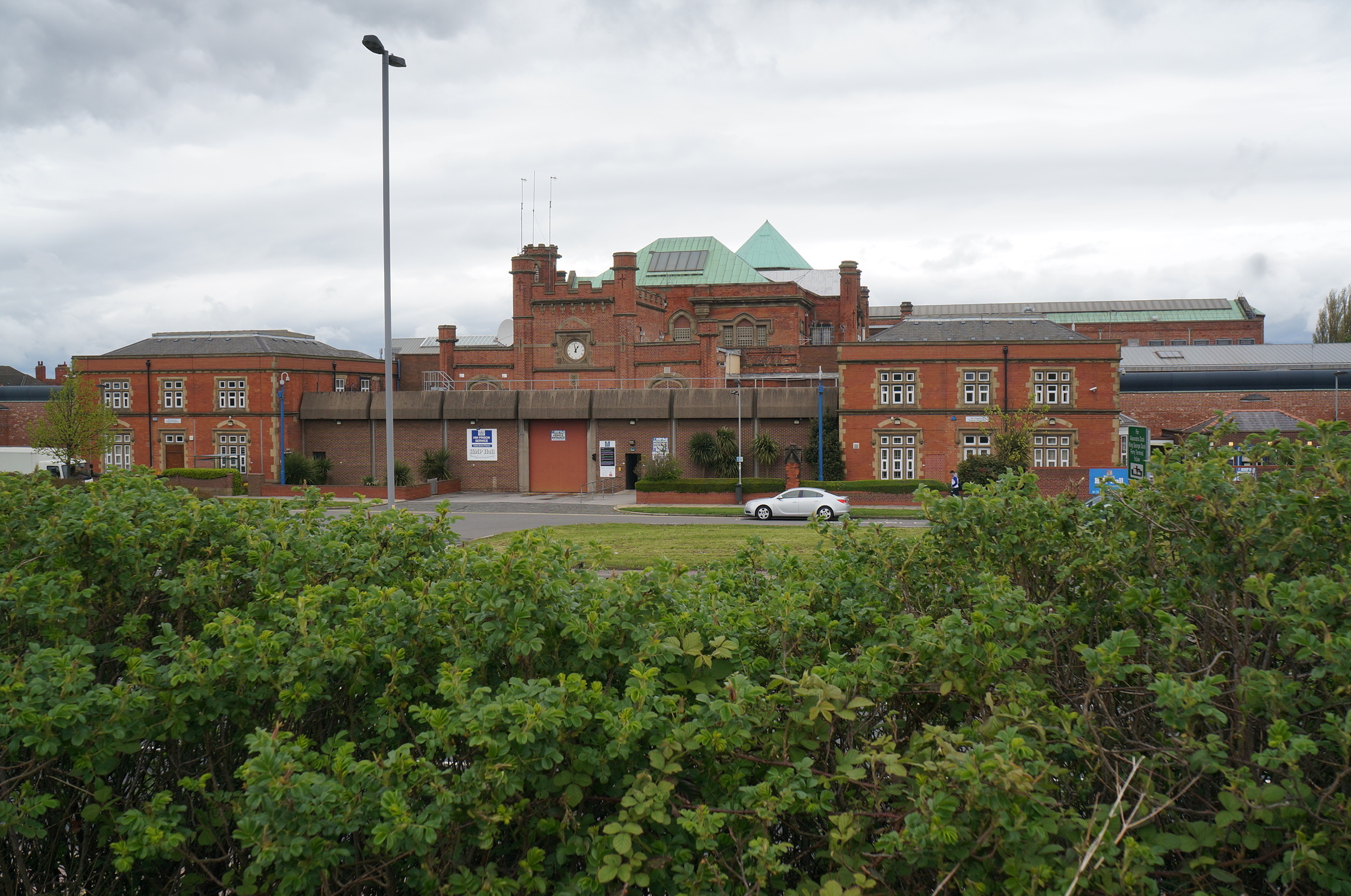
- Interactive map of HMP Hull
- Location: Kingston upon Hull,
- Security class: Adult Male/Category B&C
- Population: 1043
- Opened: 1870
- Managed by: HM Prison Services
- Governor: Philippa Harding
- Website: Hull at justice.gov.uk

HMP Hull is a Category B men's local prison located in Kingston upon Hull in England. The term 'local' means that this prison holds people on remand to the local courts. The prison is operated by His Majesty's Prison Service.

== History ==
Hull Prison, built in Hedon Road in 1865, succeeding a previous prison in Kingston Street, and opened in 1870, is of a typical Victorian design.

Ethel Major was the last person and only woman to be executed at Hull in 1934. She had been convicted of the murder of her husband. The Prison suffered bomb damage during the Second World War Hull Blitz.

An exhibition "Within These Walls" follows the prison's history from 1299 to 1934. The exhibition was designed and created by retired Officer Rob Nicholson and officially opened by Lawrence Major, Ethel's grandson.

In 1976 Hull prison was involved in a three-day riot by inmates of the prison. Over 100 prisoners were involved in a protest that erupted over staff brutality. The riot ended peacefully on 3 September 1976 but over two thirds of the prison was destroyed, with an estimated repair cost of £3 – £4 million. The prison was closed for a year while repairs were carried out. Disciplinary proceedings following the riots led to a number of legal challenges.

The Prison was removed from the high-security estate in 1985 and became a local prison holding inmates remanded and sentenced by courts in the area.

In 2002 a major expansion was completed making the prison more modern rather than Victorian, which added four new wings, a new gymnasium, a new health care centre and a multi-faith centre.

In January 2013, the Ministry of Justice announced that older parts of Hull Prison will close, with a reduction of 282 places at the prison. In April 2014 the Ministry of Justice announced that these would be brought back into use as the "prison population is currently above published projections".

After rioting at Birmingham Prison in December 2016, some prisoners were transferred from Birmingham to Hull. Disturbances were reported at HMP Hull.

On 14 September 2018, Staff at HMP Hull, along with many other prisons across the country, walked out under protest due to health and safety conditions across the prison estate. The protest was amid fears of rising violence, wanting safety improvements and a reduction in violence and overcrowding.

In January 2019, it was announced that HMP Hull will be one of 10 prisons chosen for body scanners which aims to reduce drugs and violence, while improving standards, in the country's most challenging jails providing a template for the wider estate.

In January 2021, it was reported that HMP Hull had been dealing with a huge COVID-19 outbreak which saw around 80 prisoners and staff struck down by the virus.

== The prison today ==
Hull is a local prison holding remand, sentenced and convicted males. Prisoners are employed in the workshops, kitchens, gardens and waste management departments. Education classes are also available to prisoners.

HMP Hull houses the Within These Walls exhibition which charts the history of Hull's prisons from 1299 through to the present day. The exhibition was created by retired Officer Rob Nicholson and opened in 2011.

== Notable inmates ==
- Charles Bronson
- Malcolm Fairley (aka "The Fox")
- Robert Maudsley
- Vladimir Motin
- Tommy Robinson
- Paul Sykes
