= Listed buildings in Rotherham (West Ward) =

Rotherham West is a ward in the Metropolitan Borough of Rotherham, South Yorkshire, England. The ward contains nine listed buildings that are recorded in the National Heritage List for England. All the listed buildings are designated at Grade II, the lowest of the three grades, which is applied to "buildings of national importance and special interest". The ward is to the west of the centre of Rotherham, and includes the suburb of Kimberworth. The listed buildings consist of a former manor house and associated structures, a large house used as offices, a mausoleum, a lock on the River Don Navigation, a railway bridge, and a public house.

== Buildings ==
Name and location	Photograph	Date	Notes
Barn and horse engine house southeast of Kimberworth Manor House; 53.43431°N 1.39071°W	—	Late 17th century (probable)	The barn with a horse engine house at the rear is in a ruinous condition. The building is in sandstone with quoins, and partly in two storeys. The barn has five bays, a two-bay extension on the left, and a partial aisle on the front. The openings include a cart entry, doorways, windows, a hatch, slit vents, and an owl hole.
Dovecote south-southeast of Kimberworth Manor House; 53.43426°N 1.39098°W	—	Late 17th century (probable)	The dovecote is in sandstone, with quoins, and a stone slate roof with square-cut gable copings and kneelers. There are two storeys and a single bay. On the front is a large opening, above which is a casement window with a stone ledge and a panel pierced with pigeon holes. At the rear, steps lead up to a doorway, and on the roof is a wooden lantern.
Kimberworth Manor House; 53.43461°N 1.39121°W		1694	The manor house, which was later extended, is in sandstone, with a plinth band, quoins, lintel bands, and a Welsh slate roof that has gables with moulding surrounds and copings. There are three storeys and a cellar, five bays, and a two-storey single-bay extension on the left. Over the middle three bays, and over each of the outer bays is a gable, each gable containing a near-circular window with a moulded surround. In the centre of the house is a doorway with a moulded surround, the remains of a pulvinated frieze, and a peaked cornice, and in the left bay is a doorway with a chamfered surround. The windows either have a single light, or are mullioned with two lights.
Farm building southeast of Kimberworth Manor House; 53.43410°N 1.39045°W	—	18th century (probable)	A cowhouse and hayloft, now in ruins, the building is in sandstone with quoins and a Welsh slate roof. There are two storeys and six bays, and the building contains doorways, one with a quoined surround, windows, hatches, slit vents, and a gabled dormer, and external steps lead to an upper floor doorway.
Ferham House; 53.43038°N 1.37724°W	—	c. 1787	A large house, later offices, in red brick on a plinth, with bands, a modillion eaves cornice, and a hipped tile roof, with an open pediment over the central bay. There are three storeys and cellars, and symmetrical fronts of three and five bays. The porch has a doorway with pilasters, a fanlight, and a pediment on two columns. Above is a round-arched panel containing an Ionic Venetian window, and the other windows are sashes in architraves, some with cornices. In the left return is a three-storey bay window, and the right return has a square projection with a tripartite window in the ground floor and a Diocletian window in the upper floor.
Walker Mausoleum and enclosure 53.43127°N 1.36548°W	—	Early 19th century (probable)	The mausoleum is in sandstone on a plinth, with quoins, and a moulded eaves cornice, a blocking course carved with a family emblem, and a hipped slate roof with ridge tiles. The building is square with a single storey. The doorway has an architrave, and a shallow pediment on consoles, and in front of it are free-standing urns. Flanking the door are square piers with moulded plinths, and gable-shaped caps. The mausoleum is surrounded by an enclosure with railings, obelisks, and end piers.
Jordan Lock; 53.42456°N 1.39388°W	—	1835 (probable)	The lock is on the River Don Navigation. It has walls of gritstone, the exit wall has been rebuilt in brick, and the gates are wooden.
Railway bridge 53.42699°N 1.38287°W	—	1838 (probable)	The bridge was built by the Sheffield and Rotherham Railway to carry a track over its line, and is in red brick with sandstone dressings. It consists of a single segmental arch with a keystone, springing from a moulded band. Above the arch is a rounded band and a parapet with moulded and chamfered copings. The bridge is flanked by piers and abutment walls with square end piers.
Prince of Wales public house 53.43031°N 1.37111°W		Early 1840s	The public house, on a corner site, is in sandstone on a plinth, with a rusticated ground floor and quoins above, a frieze, an eaves projection and modillion cornice, and a hipped Welsh slate roof. There are three storeys and cellars, fronts of five and three bays, a rear wing on the right, and on the left is a single-storey link to a two-storey three-bay house. On the front is a portico with paired Doric columns and an entablature that continues around the building. The windows are casements, those in the middle floor with architraves and cornices on consoles. The window above the portico has a balustrade, and above it are the Prince of Wales's feathers.
