= Stone, South Yorkshire =

Hamlet in South Yorkshire, England

Coordinates: 53.402°N 1.170°W

Stone
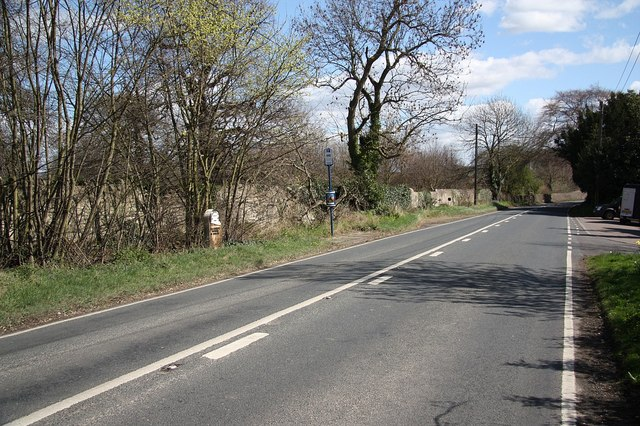
- The A634 passing through Stone

- Location within South Yorkshire
- Civil parish: Maltby
- Metropolitan borough: Rotherham
- Metropolitan county: South Yorkshire
- Region: Yorkshire and the Humber
- Country: England
- Sovereign state: United Kingdom
- Post town: SHEFFIELD
- Postcode district: S66
- Dialling code: 01709
- Police: South Yorkshire
- Fire: South Yorkshire
- Ambulance: Yorkshire
- UK Parliament: Rother Valley

Stone is a hamlet in the civil parish of Maltby, in the Rotherham district lying to the south of Rotherham, South Yorkshire, England. Roche Abbey stands to the west of the hamlet, with Sandbeck Park to the north.

== Firbeck Dike ==
The Firbeck Dike flows through the hamlet. Stone Mill, dating back to 17th century, still stands on the dike.
