= Ravenfield =

Village and civil parish in South Yorkshire, England

Coordinates: 53.4512°N 1.2712°W

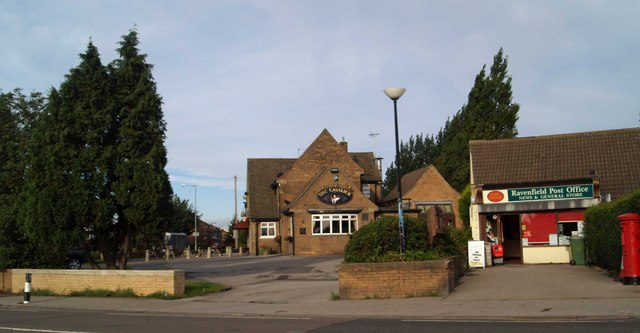
- Ravenfield Common with pub and post office (post office since removed)

- Location within South Yorkshire
- Population: 2,828 (2011)
- OS grid reference: SK 483 952
- Civil parish: Ravenfield
- Metropolitan borough: Rotherham
- Metropolitan county: South Yorkshire
- Region: Yorkshire and the Humber
- Country: England
- Sovereign state: United Kingdom
- Post town: ROTHERHAM
- Postcode district: S65
- Police: South Yorkshire
- Fire: South Yorkshire
- Ambulance: Yorkshire
- UK Parliament: Rawmarsh and Conisbrough

Ravenfield is a small village and civil parish in South Yorkshire, England. It is located in the Metropolitan Borough of Rotherham, 3.3 miles (5.3 km) east of the town of Rotherham. The older part is a former farming village and over recent years has become a pretty rural community; it has been particularly successful in the Britain in Bloom competitions. It has a population of 2,018, increasing to 2,828 at the 2011 census.

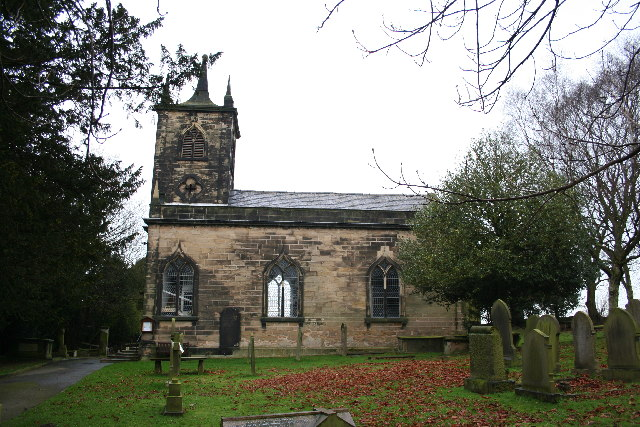
St James' church

The old village is situated in a fold in the hills just below the 1756 church of St James by John Carr, close to the site of the John Carr's now demolished Ravenfield Hall and adjacent to Ravenfield Park. The estate was sold in 1920 when the park was broken into separate farms. Many of the old barns have been demolished or converted into homes. In 1907 the railway came to Ravenfield with a line being built to link Silverwood colliery to the main line and on to Bawtry.

Ravenfield old Village Garden Society was created in 1987 with the aim of improving the local environment. In the early days the village lacked colour and there were very few publicly planted areas. Most of the gardens were very well tended and colourful. It soon became apparent that entering the Yorkshire in Bloom competition led to greater awareness of the potential and diversity of the local environment and a concerted effort has been made ever since to improve it following the RHS guidelines on community, environment, sustainability and horticulture. The village has represented Yorkshire in the national Britain in Bloom competition winning medals on three occasions. In 2008 the village won a gold medal as well as best in category.

== See also ==
- Listed buildings in Ravenfield
