= Slade Hooton =

Hamet in South Yorkshire, England

Coordinates: 53.397°N 1.215°W

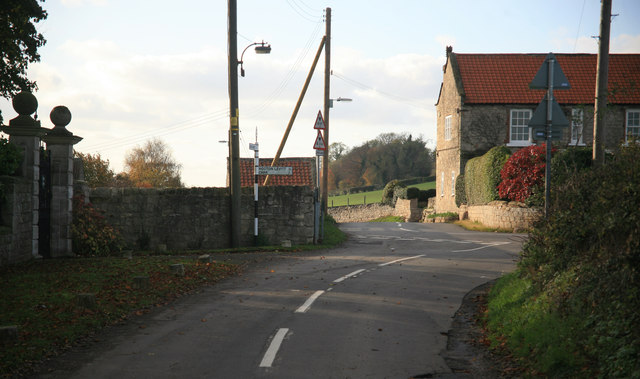
- Slade Hooton road junction

- Location within South Yorkshire
- OS grid reference: SK523892
- Civil parish: Laughton en le Morthen
- Metropolitan borough: Rotherham
- Metropolitan county: South Yorkshire
- Region: Yorkshire and the Humber
- Country: England
- Sovereign state: United Kingdom
- Post town: SHEFFIELD
- Postcode district: S25
- Police: South Yorkshire
- Fire: South Yorkshire
- Ambulance: Yorkshire

Slade Hooton /ˈsleɪd ˈhuːtən/ is a hamlet in the Metropolitan Borough of Rotherham, in South Yorkshire, England. Historically in the West Riding of Yorkshire, the hamlet was moved into South Yorkshire in April 1974.

== History ==
Slade Hooton is recorded in the Domesday Book as Hotone, and having three carucates of land. The name of the hamlet derives from Slæd and hõh-tũn, which means valley and farmstead on a spur of land. The Slade prefix is thought to be able to distinguish it from other Hooton's such as Hooton Levitt and Hooton Pagnell.

A bus that runs three times a day, and connects Rotherham with Dinnington, stops at the south end of the hamlet.

== Governance ==
Historically, Slade Hooton was in the wapentake of Upper Strafforth, and the shire county of the West Riding of Yorkshire. Since 1974, it has been in the Metropolitan county of South Yorkshire. It is now also in the Metropolitan Borough of Rotherham. The population of the village is recorded in the 2011 Census under the civil parish of Laughton en le Morthen.
