= Whiston, South Yorkshire =

Village and civil parish in South Yorkshire, England

Coordinates: 53.40°N 1.32°W

Whiston
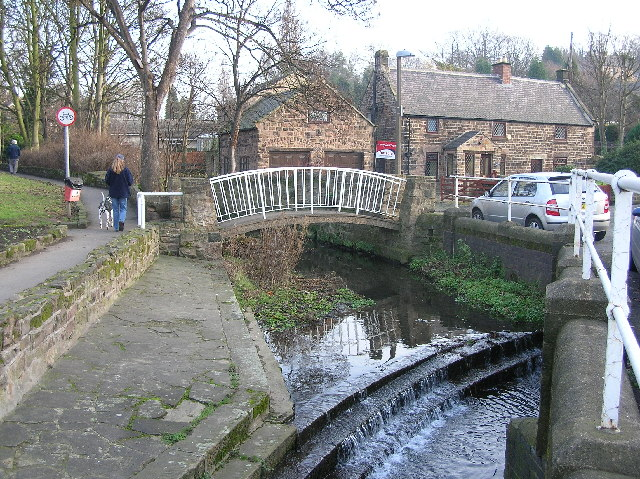
- Whiston Village and stream

- Location within South Yorkshire
- Population: 5,042 (2011)
- Civil parish: Whiston
- Metropolitan borough: Rotherham
- Metropolitan county: South Yorkshire
- Region: Yorkshire and the Humber
- Country: England
- Sovereign state: United Kingdom
- Post town: ROTHERHAM
- Postcode district: S60
- Dialling code: 01709
- Police: South Yorkshire
- Fire: South Yorkshire
- Ambulance: Yorkshire
- UK Parliament: Rotherham

Whiston is a village and civil parish in the Metropolitan Borough of Rotherham in South Yorkshire, England. It has a population of 5,115, reducing to 5,042 at the 2011 Census.

== Geography ==
Originally a small rural village between Sheffield and Rotherham, within the Saxon "Shire of Hallun" (Hallamshire), Whiston is now a suburb of Rotherham, close to its border with Sheffield.

== Etymology ==
According to A Dictionary of British Place-Names, the name Whiston comes from two Old English words wite and stan – meaning "The whitestone" which is likely to be in reference to a nearby quarry where large amounts of white stone were once mined. It is referred to as Witestan, in the Domesday Book of 1086, at which time it was part of the same manor as Handsworth (Handswrde), now a suburb of Sheffield. Close to Whiston is Blue Man's Bower, a moated site and scheduled monument.

== History ==
Even in 1900 Whiston was still a small rural village, separated from Rotherham by open countryside. As the century progressed, and particularly after 1945, many fields were built upon and Rotherham expanded to incorporate Whiston although there is still something of a green belt separating Whiston from other local villages.

On 25 June 2007, part of the village was evacuated because of fears that cracks in the dam at Ulley reservoir could lead to widespread flooding in the valley.

The village has two cricket clubs, Whiston Parish Church CC and Whiston Forge CC.

The village football team, Whiston Wildcats, play in the Sheffield and District league. They are in the A division due to a B division promotion in the 2013/14 season.

2016 saw the founding of the village's only cycling club – Sitwell Cycling Club – a British Cycling affiliated club for all ages. The club was crowned Rotherham Advertiser's Sports Club of the Year in 2018. 2019 saw the club's membership increase to over 150 members, making them the largest club in Rotherham. The club also started under 12s coaching, gaining British Cycling Go-Ride status in October of the same year.

== See also ==
- Listed buildings in Whiston, South Yorkshire
