= St Albans Crown Court =

Judicial building in St Albans, England

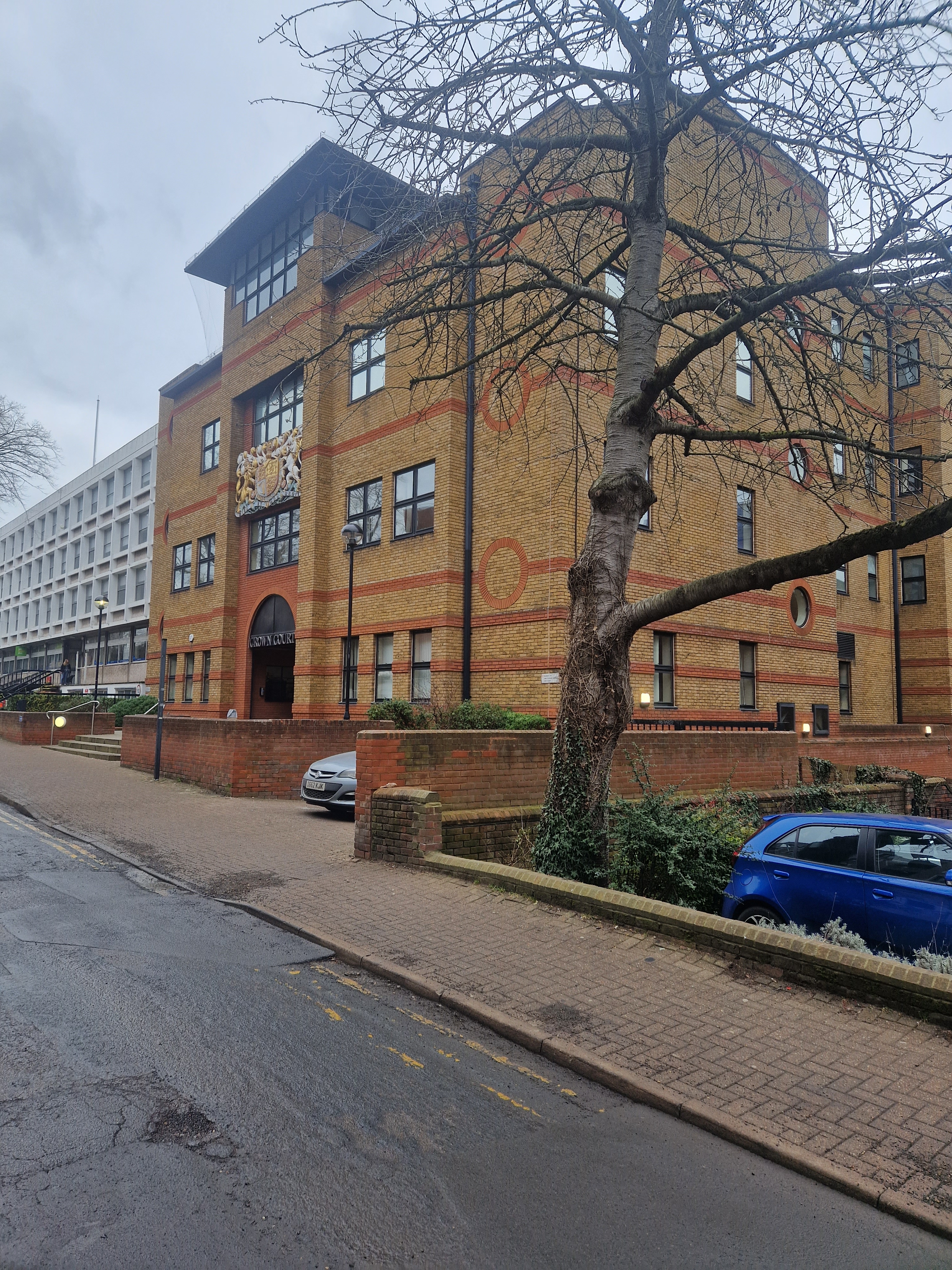
- St Albans Crown Court

- Shown in Hertfordshire
- 51.7519°N 0.3352°W
- Location: Bricket Road, St Albans

History
- Built: 1992

Site notes
- Architect(s): Macintosh Haines and Kennedy
- Architectural style: Modernist style

St Albans Crown Court is a Crown Court venue, which deals with criminal cases, in Bricket Road, St Albans, England.

== History ==
Until the early 1990s, crown court hearings were held in the Old Town Hall in St Peter's Street. However, as the number of court cases in St Albans grew, it became necessary to commission a more modern courthouse for criminal matters. The site selected by the Lord Chancellor's Department had been occupied by a large private house, No. 4 Bricket Road, which had been the home of Captain Lightly Harold Birt of the 1st Battalion, Royal Berkshire Regiment, who had been awarded the Distinguished Service Order for his actions in the First World War.

The new building was designed by Macintosh Haines and Kennedy in the Modernist style, built in brown and red brick at a cost of £16.3 million, and was completed in 1992. The design involved a symmetrical main frontage of seven bays facing onto Bricket Road with the end bays slightly recessed. The central bay, which was also slightly recessed, featured a large round headed opening on the ground floor, an eight-pane casement window surmounted by a Royal coat of arms on the first floor, and another eight-pane casement window on the second floor. The central bay was surmounted by a tower which was slightly projected forward in relation to the lower floors and contained a 16-pane casement window at attic level. The side sections, of two bays each, were fenestrated by three tall casement windows on the ground floor, two square casement windows on the first floor and by a single square casement window on the second floor. The left hand end bay was fenestrated by glazed oculi on each of the three floors, while the right had bay was fenestrated by blind oculi on each of the three floors. Internally, the building was laid out to accommodate nine courtrooms.

Notable cases have included the trial and conviction of Stephen Marshall, known as the "Jigsaw Killer", in January 2010, for the murder of his landlord, Jeffrey Howe, the trial and conviction of Angela Taylor, in November 2019, for the murder of her wealthy husband, William Taylor, and the trial and conviction of Ian Stewart, in February 2022, for the murder of his fiancée, the author, Helen Bailey.
