= Laughton en le Morthen =

Village and civil parish in South Yorkshire, England

Coordinates: 53.38°N 1.21°W

- Village
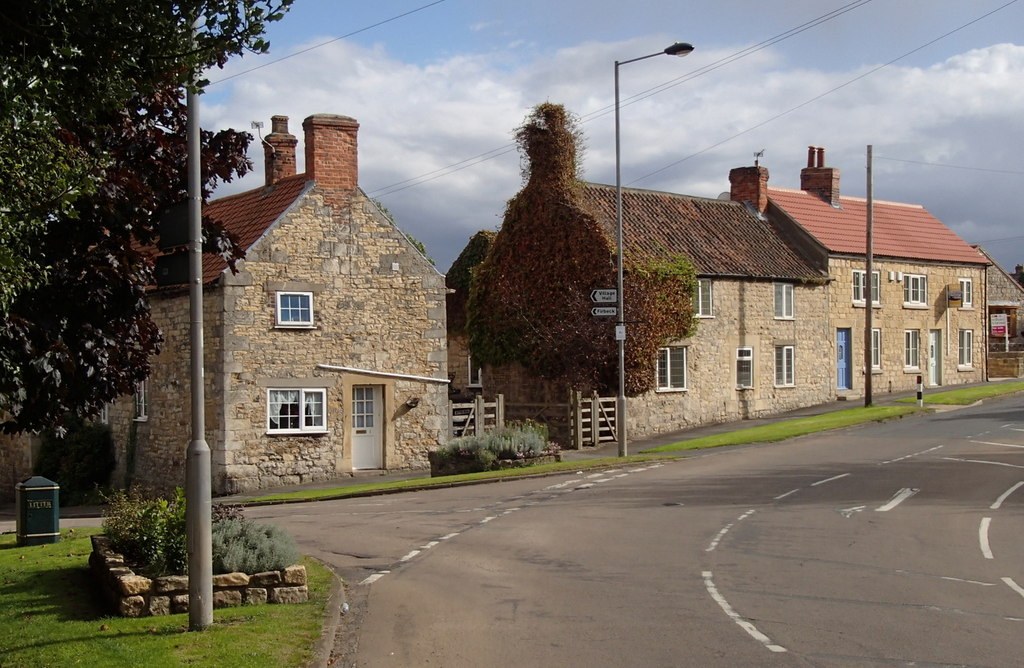
- Village scene

- Location within South Yorkshire
- Population: 1,241 (2011 census)
- OS grid reference: SK5288
- Civil parish: Laughton-en-le-Morthen
- Metropolitan borough: Rotherham
- Metropolitan county: South Yorkshire
- Region: Yorkshire and the Humber
- Country: England
- Sovereign state: United Kingdom
- Post town: SHEFFIELD
- Postcode district: S25
- Dialling code: 01909
- Police: South Yorkshire
- Fire: South Yorkshire
- Ambulance: Yorkshire
- UK Parliament: Rother Valley

Laughton en le Morthen /ˈlɔːtən ɒn lə ˈmɔːrðən/ is a village and civil parish in the Metropolitan Borough of Rotherham lying to the south of Rotherham, South Yorkshire, England, and its main attraction is All Saints’ Church with its tower and spire of 185 feet. The village had a population of 1,241 at the 2011 Census. The parish also includes the hamlets of Carr, Slade Hooton and Brookhouse, South Yorkshire.

== History ==
The name Laughton derives from the Old English lēactūn meaning 'leek farm'.

In the mid 11th century, Edwin, Earl of Mercia built one of his residences at Laughton, the location of which has been identified through archaeological investigation. That same programme of research demonstrated that following the Norman conquest of England, a castle was erected over the site of Edwin's residence by Roger de Busli (c. 1038 – c. 1099), a Norman baron who had been a loyal supporter of William's claim to the English throne. Busli was also given feudal manors in Nottinghamshire, Derbyshire and the Strafforth wapentake of Yorkshire.

To enforce his rule, Laughton castle was among a number that Busli had built in the late 11th century. The motte and bailey with a 9 m (30 ft) high mound with a 50 m (160 ft) by 20 m (66 ft) inner bailey was surrounded by large earthworks and an outer ditch. An outer bailey, which is now the churchyard of the 14th century All Saints parish church, also had substantial earth ramparts and a dry ditch.

By the time of the Domesday survey in 1085, Busli's extensive feudal landholdings, which Laughton-en-le-Morthen was part of, was known as the "Honour of Blythe" because it included 86 manors in Nottinghamshire, 46 in Yorkshire, and others in Derbyshire, Lincolnshire and Leicestershire, as well as one in Devon. He also controlled castles at Tickhill, Kimberworth, and Mexborough.

On 1 April 1923 the civil parish was abolished and merged with Thurcroft, but on 1 April 1994 the parish was recreated.

== Modern ==
Laughton has two schools, the council-run Laughton Junior and Infant School, and the Laughton Church of England School, which is situated directly opposite All Saints Church, whose distinctive spire is visible from Lincolnshire on a clear day, and is a local landmark dominating the area from the hill. The spire is 168 feet (51 m) high.

There were also two public houses in the village, the St Leger Arms (named after local landowners the St. Leger family) which like many other village pubs closed in 2009, and is now a residential property, and the Hatfeild Arms, also named after a well known local family, which closed in 2018 and remains an empty building.

The village sits on the main bus route from Worksop to Rotherham (19/19a operated by Stagecoach).

In the Second World War, a German bomber on his way back from a raid on Sheffield dropped an unused bomb on the village, which failed to go off; local farmer Henry Turner, whose family recently still lived in the village, towed the bomb to safety across his fields.

== Sport ==
The village was represented in the FA Cup by Laughton Common F.C. during the 1920s.

== See also ==
- Listed buildings in Laughton en le Morthen
