= Metropolitan Borough of Rotherham =

Metropolitan borough in South Yorkshire, England

Coordinates: 53°25′51″N 1°21′17″W

Borough of Rotherham
- Metropolitan borough
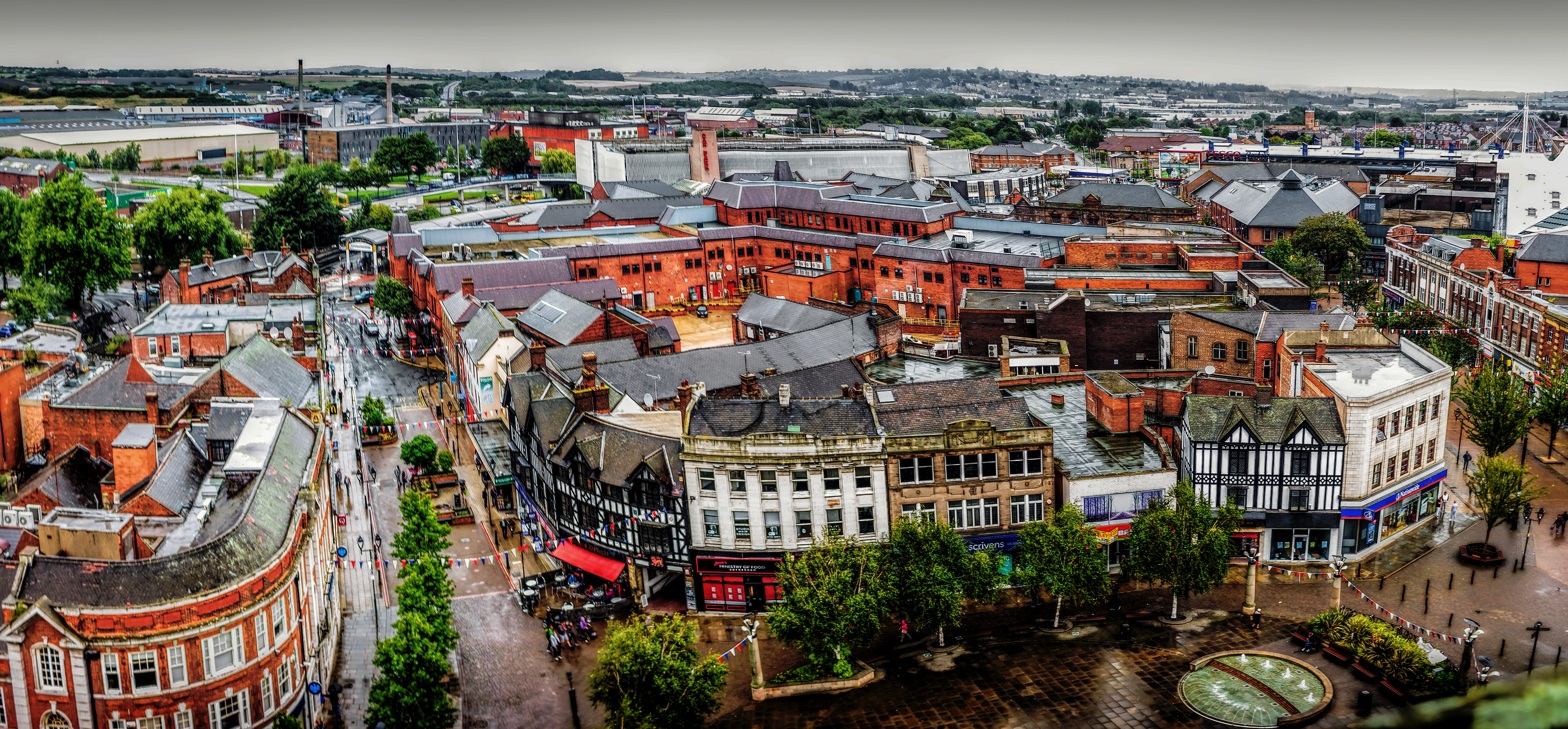
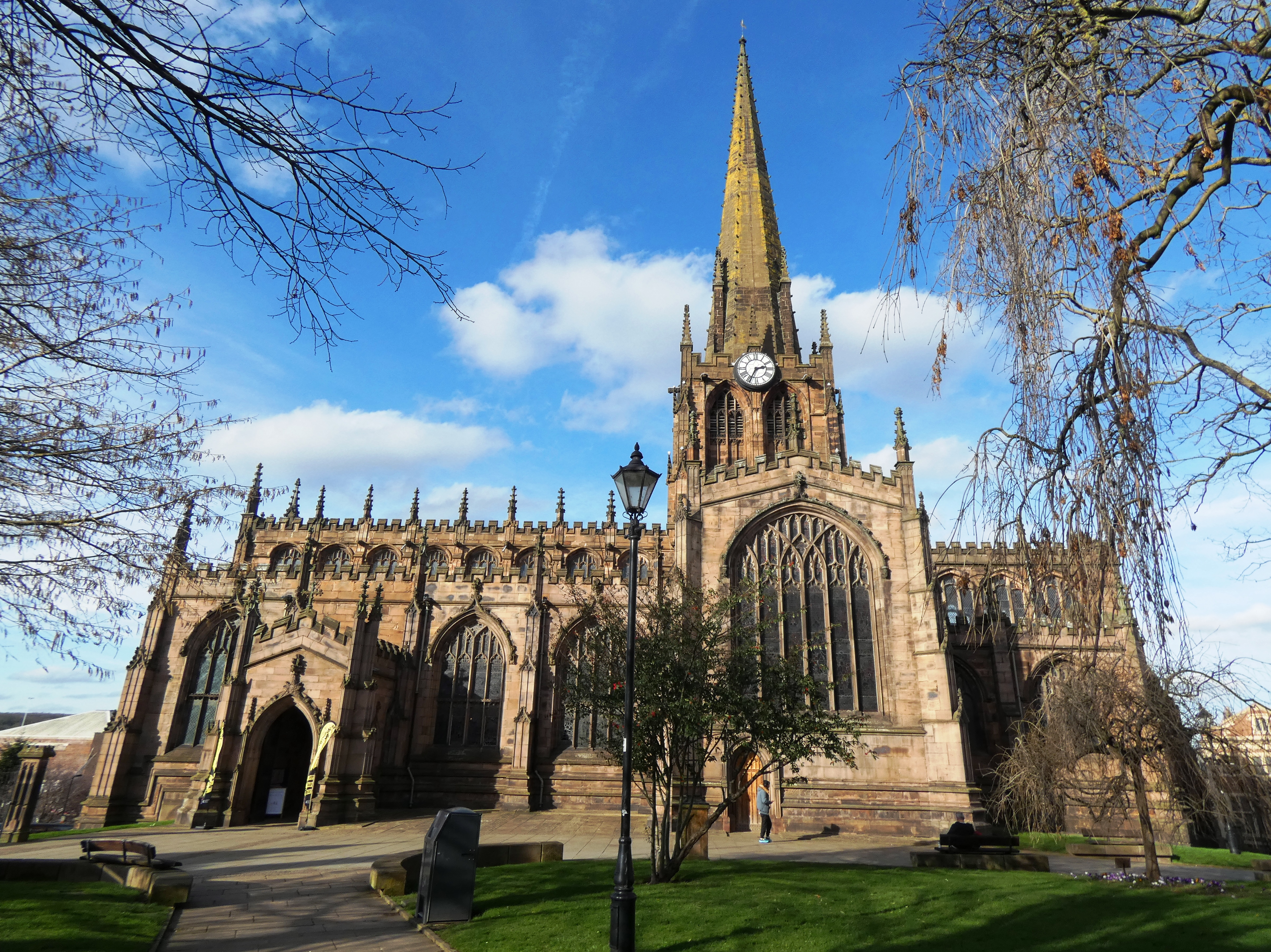
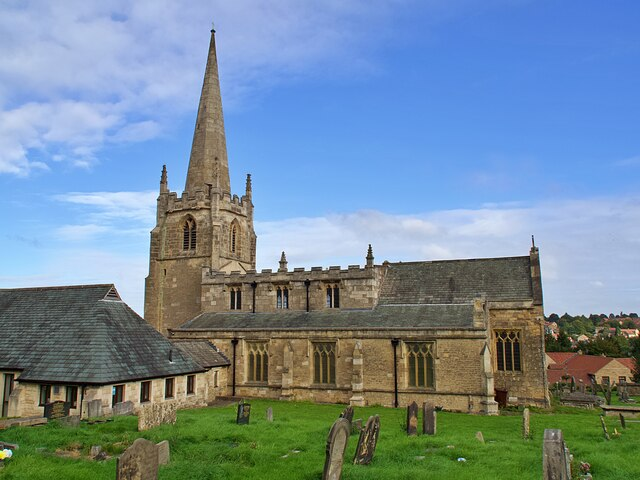
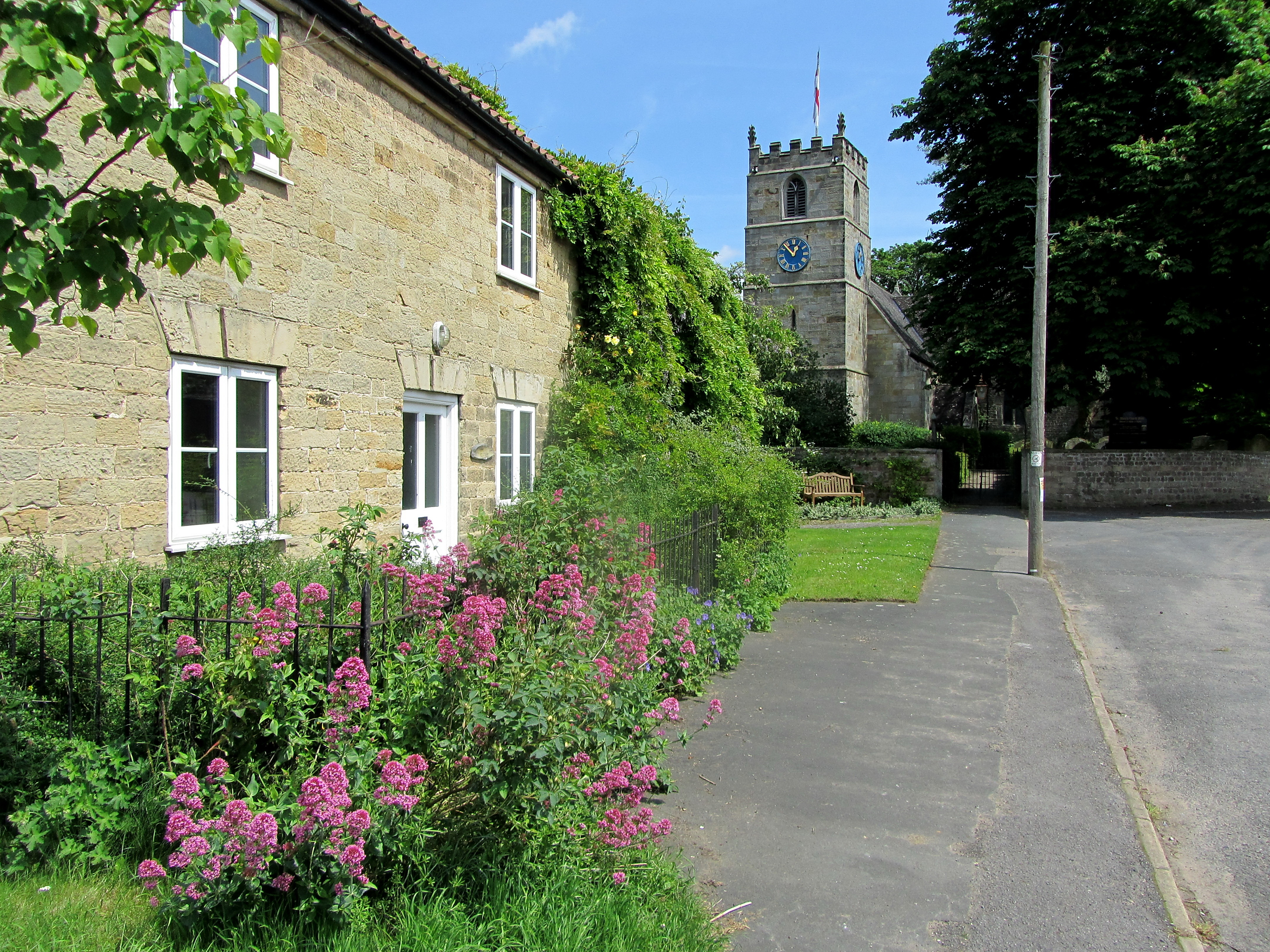
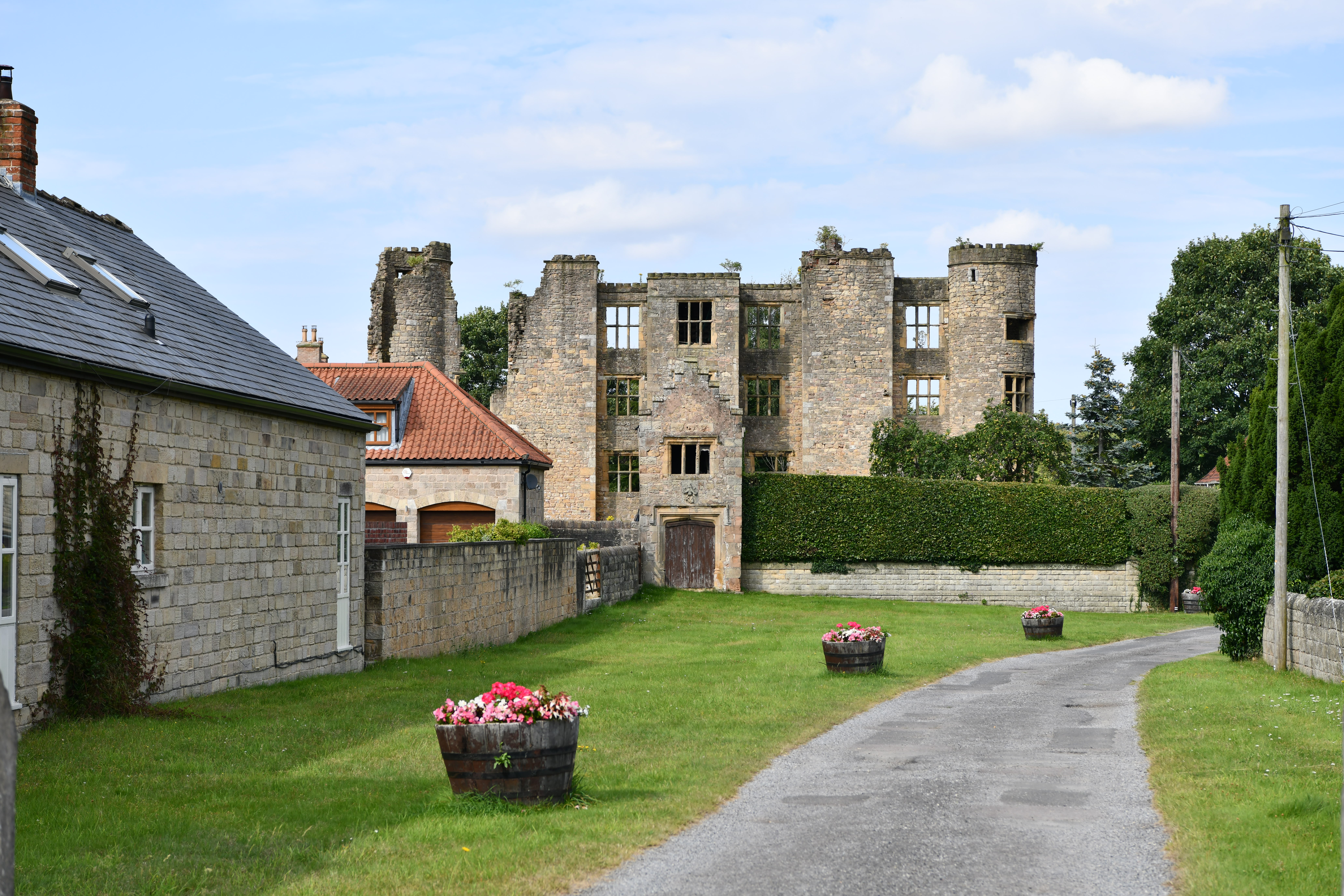
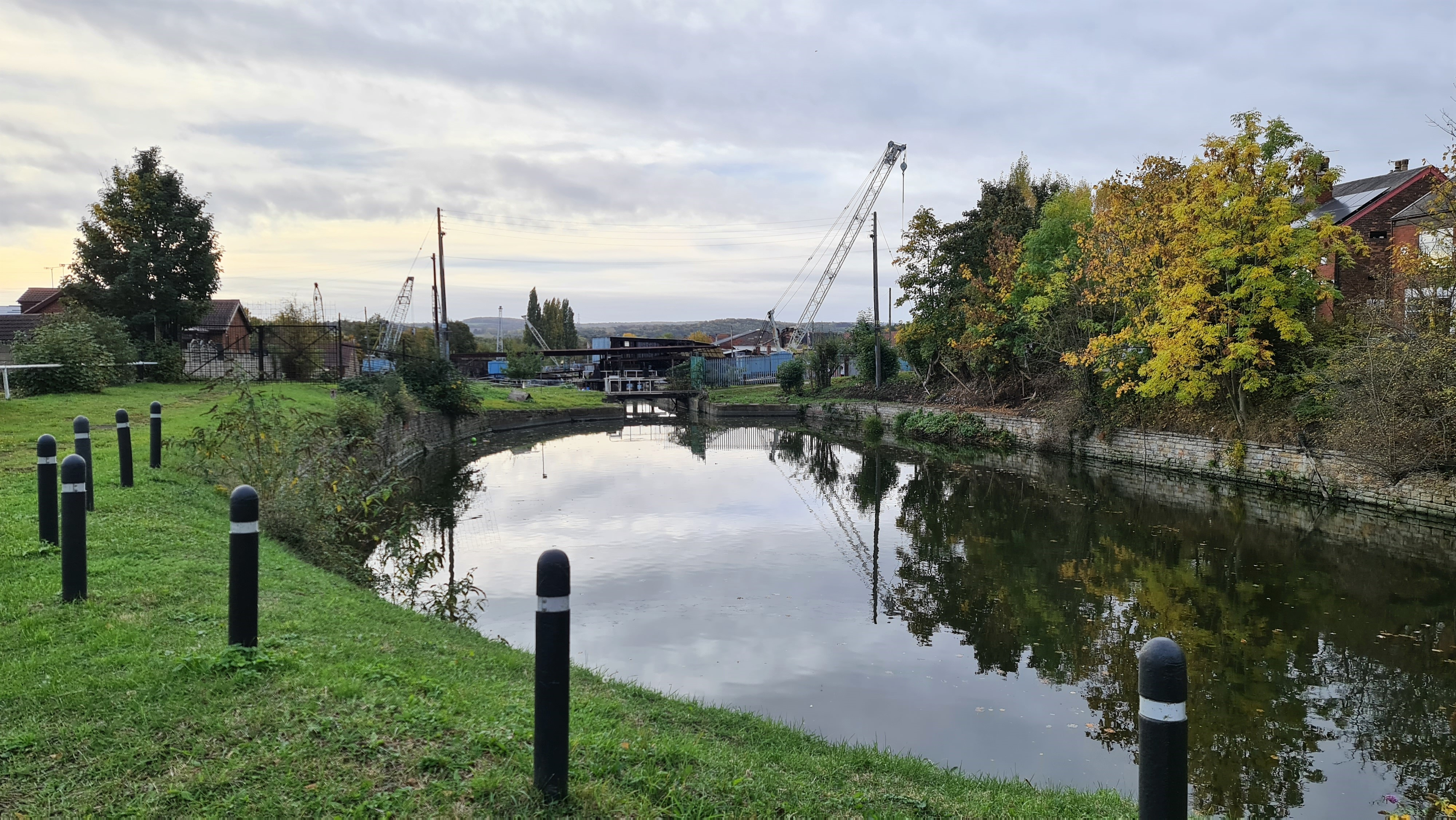
- Town Centre The Minster South Anston Wath upon Dearne Thorpe Salvin Swinton

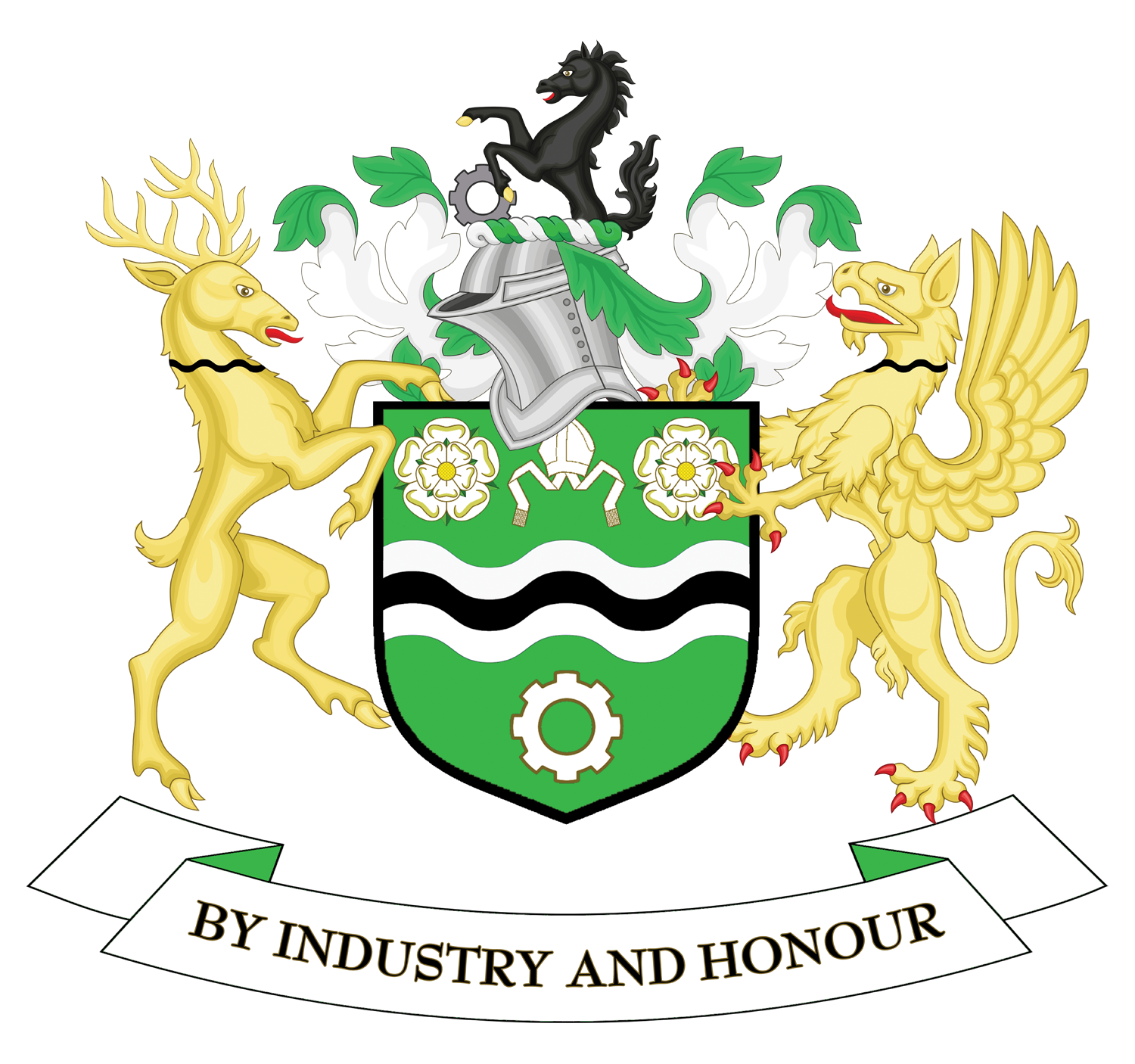
- Coat of arms of the Borough Council
- Nickname: The Heart of SY
- Motto: Where everyone matters
- Rotherham shown within South Yorkshire
- Sovereign state: United Kingdom
- Constituent country: England
- Region: Yorkshire and the Humber
- Ceremonial county: South Yorkshire
- Founded: 1974
- Admin. HQ: Rotherham

Government
  - Type: Rotherham Metropolitan Borough Council
  - Leadership: Leader & Cabinet
  - Executive: Labour
  - MPs: Jake Richards (Lab), John Healey (Lab), Sarah Champion (Lab)

Area
  - Total: 111 sq mi (287 km^{2})
  - Rank: 122nd

Population (2024)
  - Total: 276,595
  - Rank: Ranked 64th
  - Density: 2,500/sq mi (964/km^{2})

Ethnicity (2021)
  - Ethnic groups: List: 91% White; 5.3% Asian; 1.4% Mixed; 1.1% Black; 1.1% other

Religion (2021)
  - Religion: List: 49% Christianity; 39.8% no religion; 5.2% not stated; 5.1% Islam; 0.4% other; 0.3% Hinduism; 0.2% % Buddhism; 0.2% Sikhism; 0.1% Judaism
- Time zone: UTC+0 (Greenwich Mean Time)
  - Summer (DST): UTC+1 (British Summer Time)
- ISO 3166-2: GB-ROT
- ONS code: 00CF (ONS); E08000018 (GSS)
- Website: rotherham.gov.uk

The Metropolitan Borough of Rotherham is a metropolitan borough of South Yorkshire, England. It is named after its main settlement of Rotherham. The wider borough spans a larger area and covers the outlying towns of Maltby, Swinton, Wath-upon-Dearne, Dinnington. As well as the villages of Rawmarsh and Laughton. The borough includes parts of the Don, Rother and Dearne Valleys..

The district was formed on 1 April 1974, under the Local Government Act 1972, as a merger of the County Borough of Rotherham, with Maltby, Rawmarsh, Swinton and Wath-upon-Dearne urban districts along with Rotherham Rural District and Kiveton Park Rural District.

Rotherham Metropolitan Borough Council is one of the safest Labour councils in the United Kingdom, although the number of Labour council seats dropped from 92% to 79% in 2014 following the Rotherham child sexual exploitation scandal.

== Geography ==
Settlements in the borough of Rotherham include:

Anston, Aston, Aughton
Bramley, Brampton, Brampton-en-le-Morthen, Brinsworth, Brecks, Brookhouse, Broom
Canklow, Carr, Catcliffe, Clifton
Dinnington
East Dene, East Herringthorpe, Eastwood
Firbeck, Flanderwell
Gildingwells, Greasbrough
Harthill, Harley, Hellaby, Herringthorpe
Kimberworth, Kimberworth Park, Kiveton Park
Laughton-en-le-Morthen, Letwell
Maltby, Manvers, Masbrough, Moorgate, Morthen
Parkgate
Ravenfield, Rawmarsh, Ryecroft
Scholes, Slade Hooton, Stone Swallownest, Swinton, Sunnyside
Templeborough, Thorpe Hesley, Thorpe Salvin, Thrybergh, Thurcroft, Todwick, Treeton
Ulley
Wales, Wath-upon-Dearne, Waverley, Wellgate, Wentworth, West Melton, Whiston, Wickersley, Woodsetts

The borough borders City of Sheffield, Metropolitan Borough of Barnsley, City of Doncaster, Bassetlaw District in Nottinghamshire and North East Derbyshire and Bolsover District in Derbyshire. The borough is also close to the cities of Sheffield, Doncaster, Lincoln, Hull, Leeds, Bradford, Wakefield, Nottingham, Manchester and Derby.

== Demographics ==
=== Ethnicity ===
Ethnic Group	Year							
Ethnic Group	1991 census		2001 census		2011 census		2021 census	
Ethnic Group	Number	%	Number	%	Number	%	Number	%
White: Total	246,637	98%	240,463	96.9%	240,758	93.6%	241,954	91%
White: British	-	-	238,095	95.9%	236,438	91.9%	234,613	88.3%
White: Irish	1,256	0.49%	1,063		776		655	
White: Gypsy or Irish Traveller (Note: New category created for the 2011 census)	-	-			126		227	
White: Roma							699	
White: Other	-	-	1,305		3,418		5,760	
Asian or Asian British: Total	4,131	1.64%	5,833	2.4%	10,551	4.1%	14,176	5.3%
Asian or Asian British: Indian	489		497		961		1,312	
Asian or Asian British: Pakistani	3,244	1.28%	4,704		7,609		10,001	3.8%
Asian or Asian British: Bangladeshi	32		26		109		123	
Asian or Asian British: Chinese (Note: In 2001, listed under the 'Chinese or other ethnic group' heading.)	218		303		592		756	
Asian or Asian British: Other Asian	148		303		1,280		1,984	
Black or Black British: Total	394	0.15%	400		2,112	0.8%	3,016	1.1%
Black or Black British: Caribbean	144		180		283		336	
Black or Black British: African	85		180		1,672		2,260	
Black or Black British: Other Black	165		40		157		420	
Mixed: Total	-	-	1,210		2,551		3,854	
Mixed: White and Black Caribbean	-	-	352		787		1,183	
Mixed: White and Black African	-	-	104		301		583	
Mixed: White and Asian	-	-	488		865		1,300	
Mixed: Other Mixed	-	-	266		598		788	
Other: Total	475	0.18%	269		1,308		2,806	
Other: Arab (Note: New category created for the 2011 census)	-	-			581		778	
Other: Any other ethnic group	475				727		2,028	
Total	251,637	100%	248,175	100%	257,280	100%	265,806	100%

As of 2021, the Metropolitan Borough of Rotherham's population was enumerated at 265,807, and its ethnic makeup was 91% White, 5.3% Asian, 1.4% Mixed, 1.1% Black, 0.8% Other and 0.3% Arab. The Borough's religious makeup was 51.6% Christian, 42% No Religion, 5.3% Muslim, and has small Hindu and Sikh communities.

== Council elections ==
The Metropolitan Borough of Rotherham was founded in 1974, and Labour have been in control of the council since the first election.

Year	Labour	UKIP	Conservative	Others	BNP
2016 election	48	14	0	1	0
2014 election	50	10	2	1	0
2012 election	58	0	4	1	0
2011 election	54	0	7	1	1
2010 election	50	0	10	2	1
2008 election	50	0	10	1	2
2007 election	54	0	7	2	0

== Arms ==
Coat of arms of Metropolitan Borough of Rotherham

Notes
Granted 19 December 1977.
Crest
On a wreath of colours a demi-horse Sable resting its dexter hoof upon a cogwheel Proper.
Escutcheon
Vert on a fess wavy between in chief a mitre between two Argent roses barbed and seeded Proper and in base a cogwheel Argent a bar wavy Sable.
Supporters
On the dexter a buck and on the sinister a griffin Or each charged upon the neck with a bar wavy Sable.
Motto
By Industry And Honour
Badge
Lozenge enclosed by horseshoe inverted Sable winged Or.

== See also ==
- Listed buildings in Rotherham
