= Rotherham =

Town in South Yorkshire, England

Coordinates: 53.430°N 1.357°W

- Market town
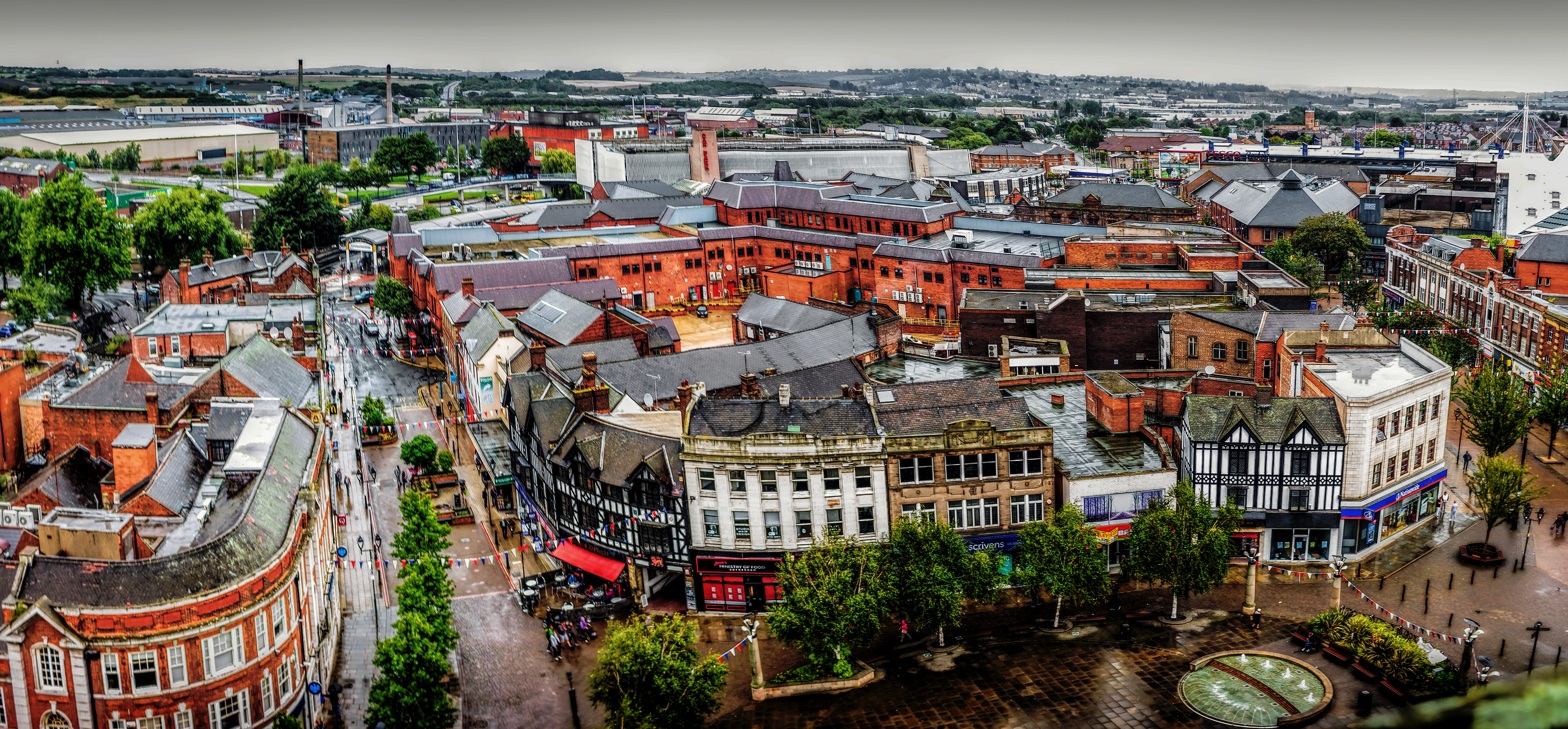
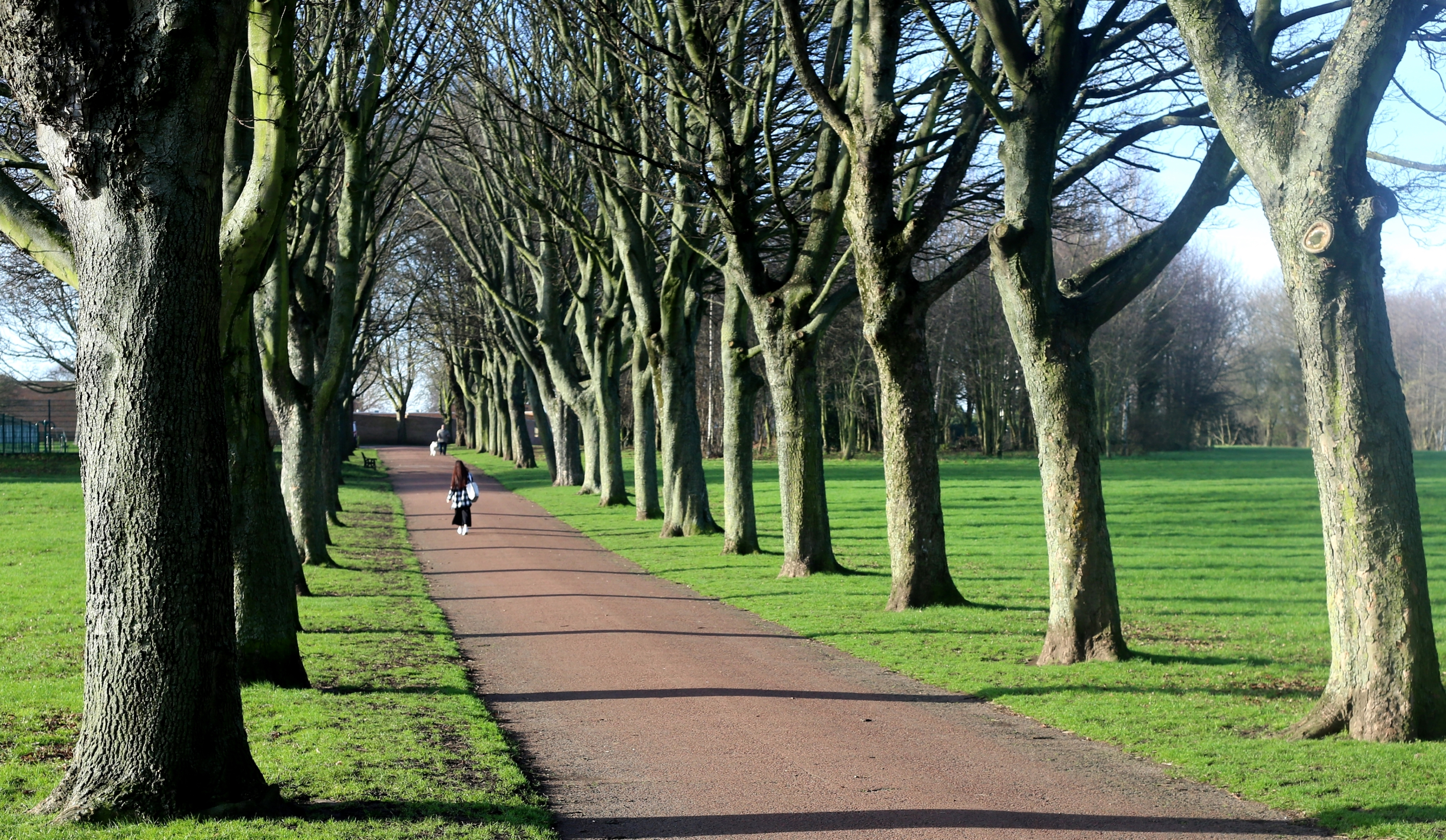
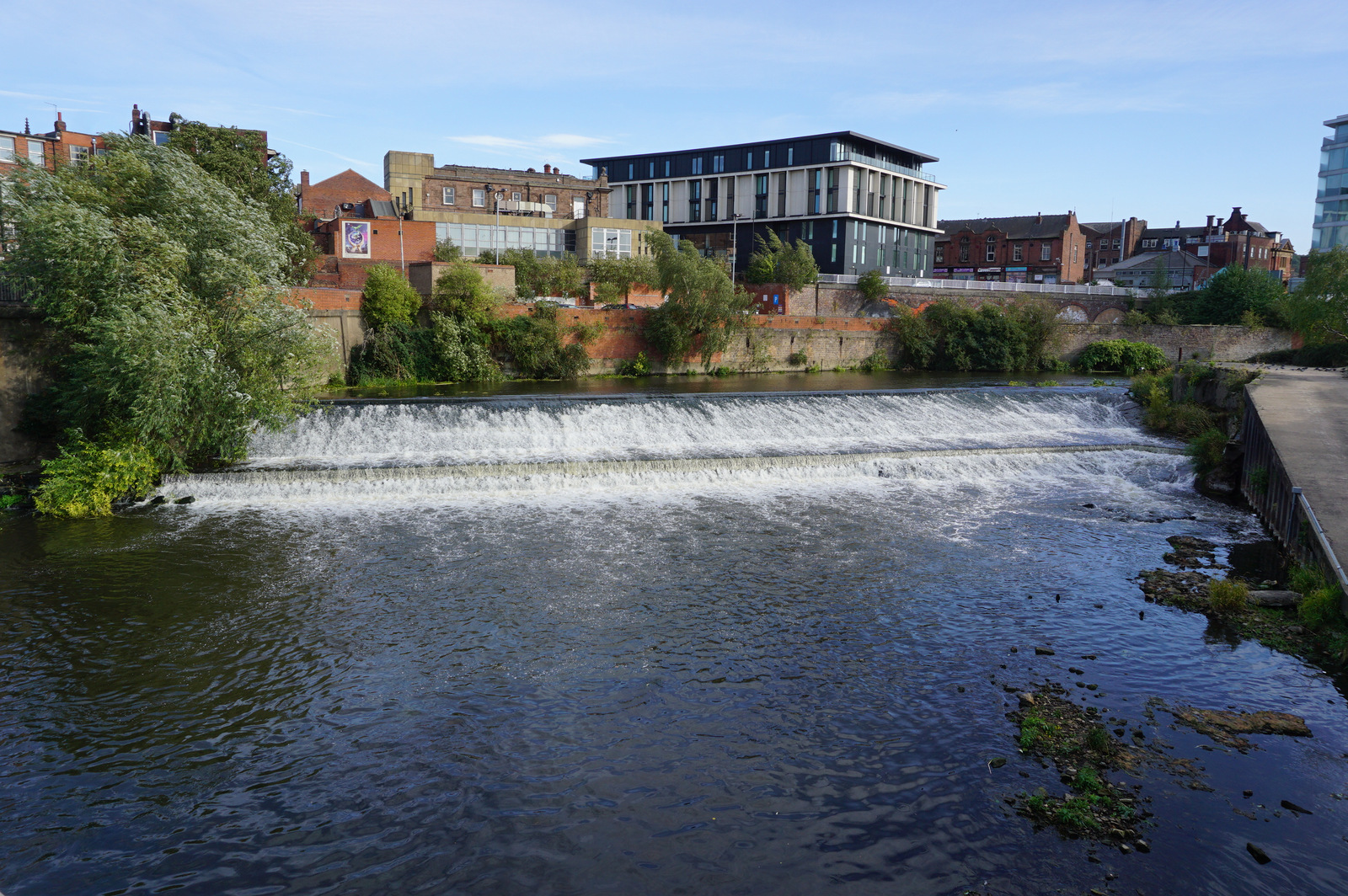
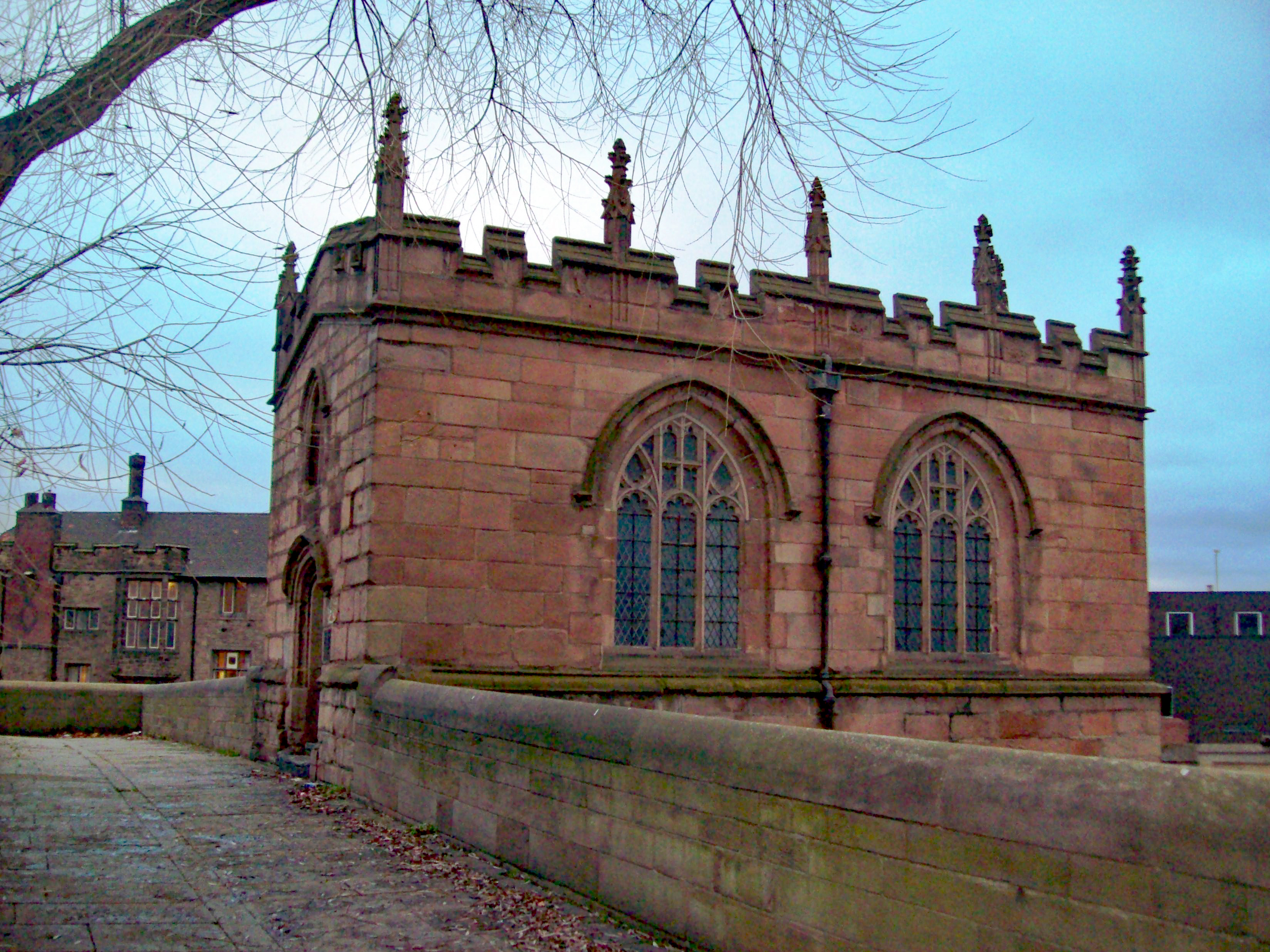
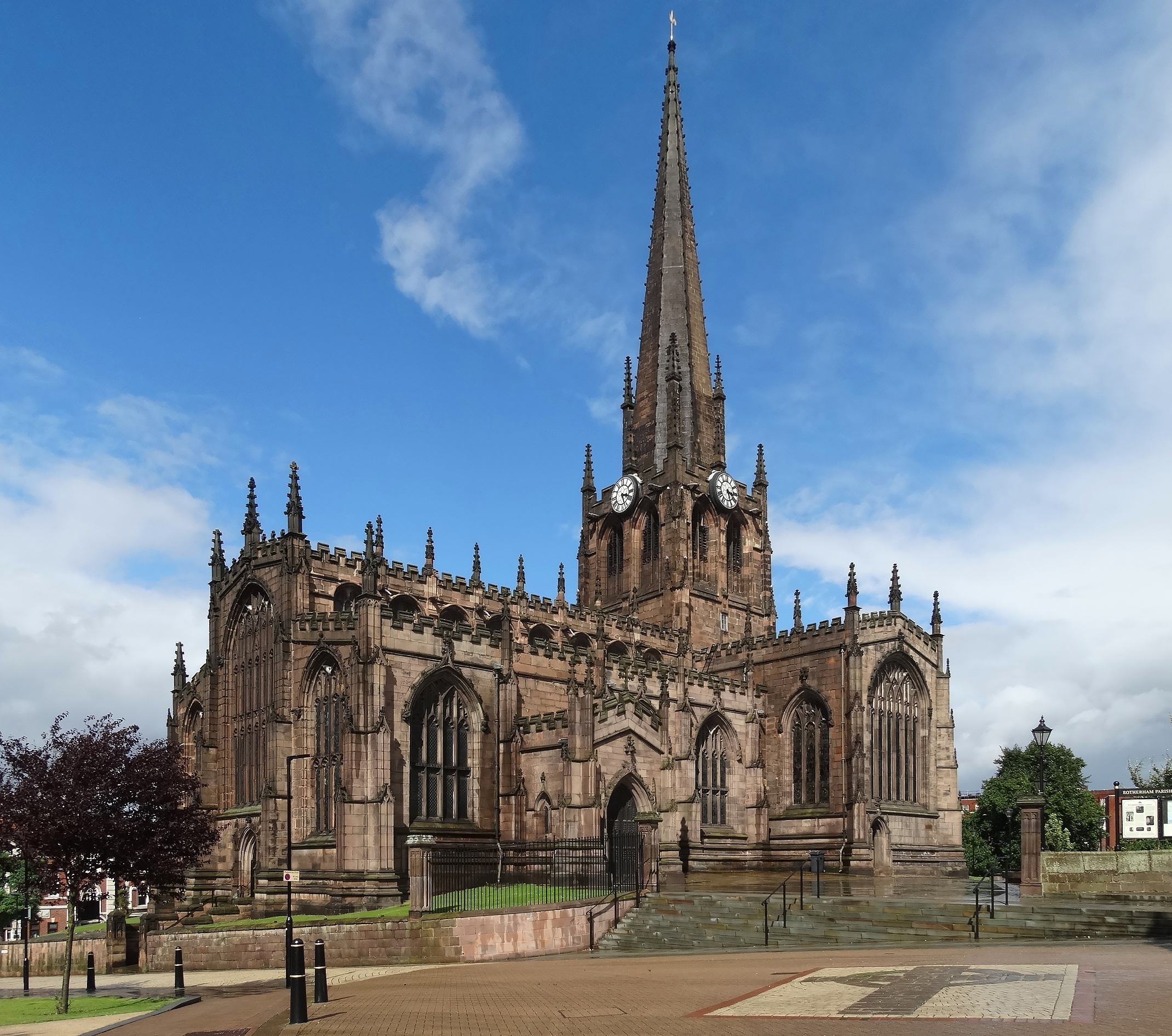
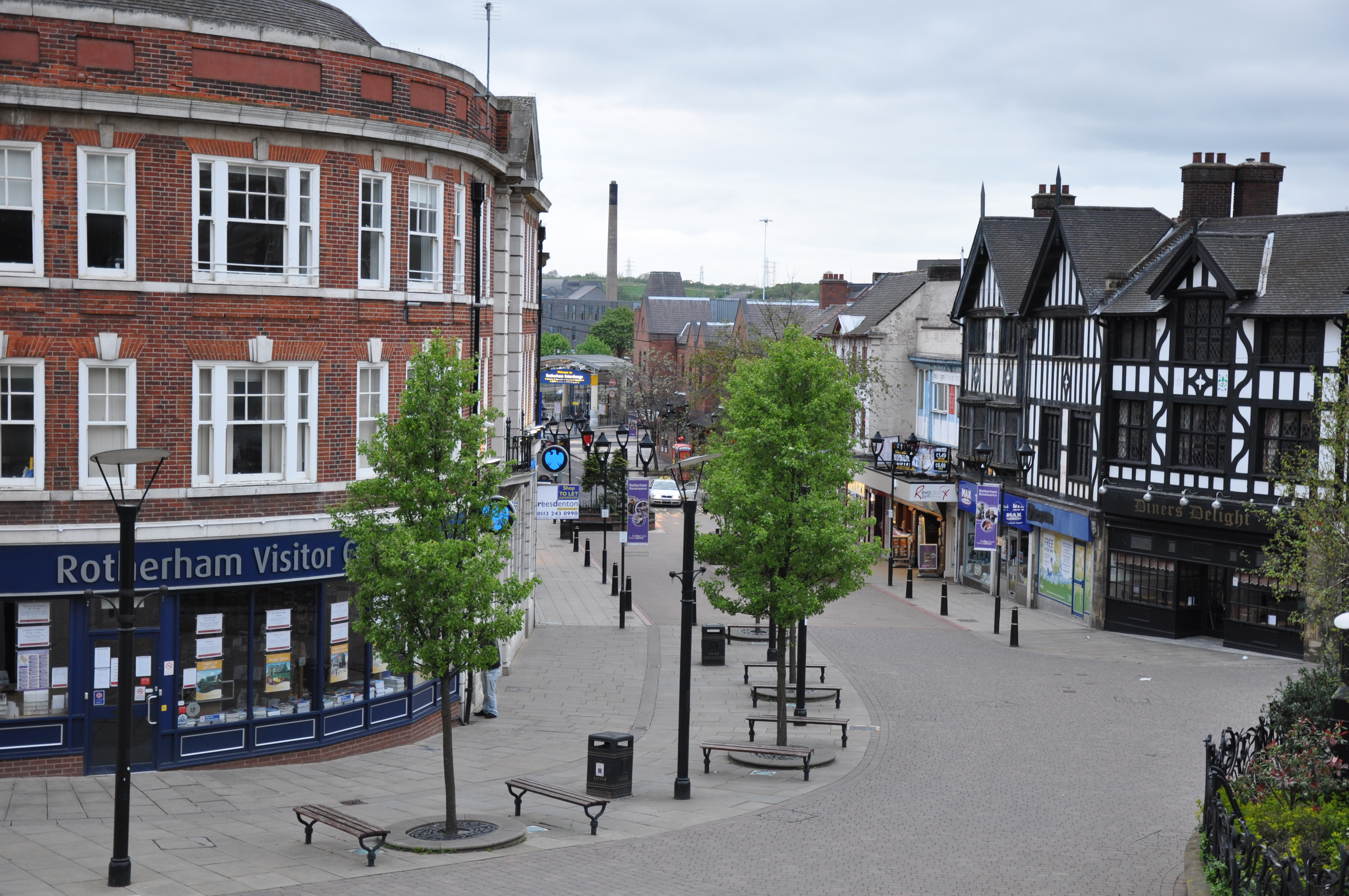
- Rotherham Skyline Clifton Park River Don Bridge Chapel Minster High Street

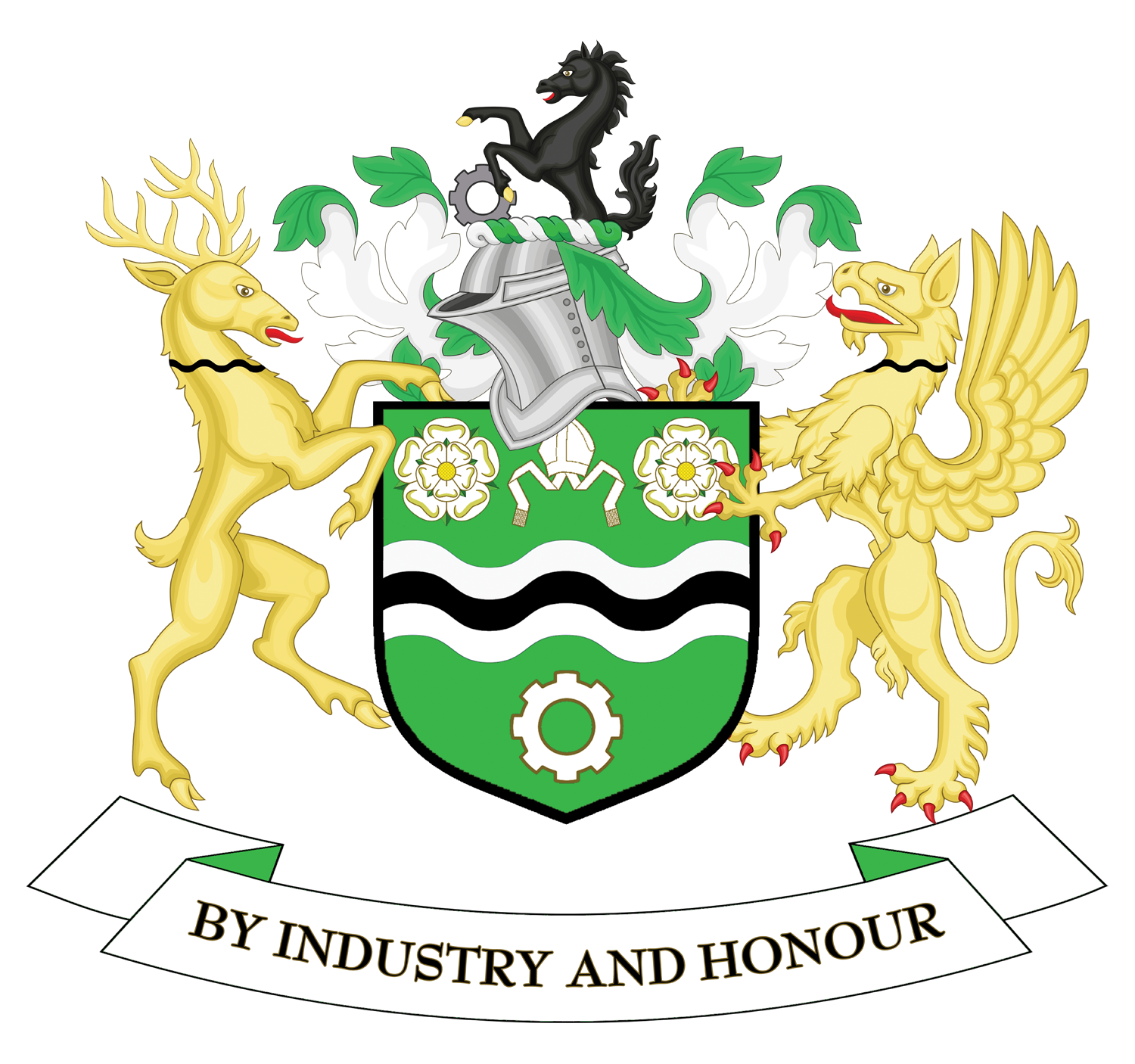
- Coat of arms

- Location within South Yorkshire
- Population: 129,897 (2021 census)
- OS grid reference: SK4392
- Metropolitan borough: Rotherham
- Metropolitan county: South Yorkshire
- Region: Yorkshire and the Humber
- Country: England
- Sovereign state: United Kingdom
- Areas of the town: List: Aldwarke; Canklow; Clifton; Kimberworth; Parkgate; Templeborough; Thrybergh; Wingfield
- Post town: ROTHERHAM
- Postcode district: S60-S62, S65, S66
- Dialling code: 01709 (with 0114, 01226 and 01909 in parts)
- Police: South Yorkshire
- Fire: South Yorkshire
- Ambulance: Yorkshire
- UK Parliament: Rotherham
- Website: rotherham.gov.uk

Rotherham (Note: Pronounced /ˈrɒðərəm/ RODH-ər-əm, locally /ˈrɒðrəm/ RODH-əm) is a market town in South Yorkshire, England. It lies at the confluence of the River Rother, from which the town takes its name, and the River Don. It is the largest settlement in the Metropolitan Borough of Rotherham.

Before the Industrial Revolution, traditional industries included farming, glass making and flour milling. In the late 18th and 19th centuries, Rotherham became known for its coal mining and, later, steel industries. The town's historic county is Yorkshire, and Rotherham was once part of the West Riding of Yorkshire. In 1974, this administrative county was abolished during a reorganisation of local government. Subsequently, Rotherham became part of South Yorkshire, where it forms one of four metropolitan boroughs.

Rotherham had a population of 129,897 in the 2021 census. The borough had an estimate population of 279,161 in 2024, the 65th most populous district in England.

== History ==
=== Early history ===
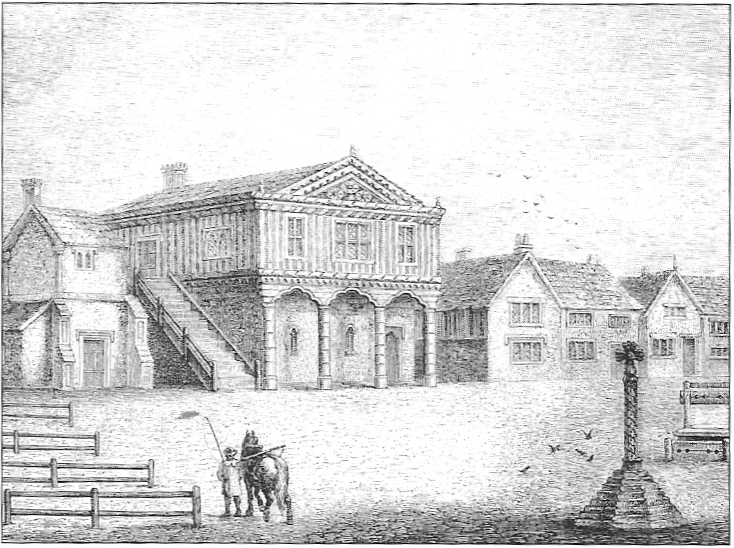
Rotherham in the late Medieval period

Evidence of Iron Age and Roman settlements has been found in Rotherham area. This includes a small Roman fort to the south-west in the upper flood meadow of the Don at Templeborough.

Rotherham was founded in the early Middle Ages. Its name is from Old English hām 'homestead, estate', meaning 'homestead on the Rother'. The river name is of Brittonic origin for 'main river', ro- 'over, chief' and duβr 'water'. Another river called the Rother flows through East Sussex. An Anglo-Saxon settlement, with an ecclesiastical parish, was established near the Roman ford across the River Don.

The 1086 Domesday Book records a manor previously held by lord Hakon in 1066 tenanted by William the Conqueror's half-brother, Robert de Mortain. The 1086 record shows an absentee lord who held the most inhabited manor, Nigel Fossard. The town area today includes eight outlying Domesday estates. Eight adult male householders were counted as villagers, three were smallholders and one the priest, three ploughlands were tilled by one lord's plough team and two and a half men's plough teams were active. The manor also had a church, roughly four acres of meadow and seven woodland acres. Rotherham had a mill valued at half a pound sterling.

Fossard's successors, the De Vesci family, rarely visited the town, but maintained a Friday market and a fair. In the mid 13th century, John de Vesci and Ralph de Tili gave all their possessions in Rotherham to Rufford Abbey. The monks from the abbey collected tithes from the town and gained rights to an extra market day on Monday and to extend the annual fair from two to three days.

The townsmen of Rotherham formed the "Greaves of Our Lady's Light", an organisation which worked with the town's three guilds. It was suppressed in 1547 but revived in 1584 as the feoffees of the common lands of Rotherham, and remains in existence.

In the 1480s, the Rotherham-born Archbishop of York, Thomas Rotherham, instigated the building of a College of Jesus in Rotherham to rival the colleges of Cambridge and Oxford. It was the first brick building in what is now South Yorkshire and taught theology, religious chant and hymns, grammar and writing.

The college and new parish of All Saints Church made Rotherham an enviable and modern town at the turn of the 16th century. The college was dissolved in 1547 during the reign of Edward VI, and its assets were stripped by the crown. Very little remains of the original building in College Street. Walls of part of the College of Jesus are encased within number 23 and Nos 2, 2A, 4 (later for a time Old College Inn, a beerhouse), 6 and 8 Effingham Street. A doorway was rescued from demolition and relocated to nearby Boston Park in 1879. Sixty years after the college's dissolution Rotherham was described by a wealthy visitor as falling from a fashionable college town to a place of gambling and vice. The history of Thomas Rotherham and education in the town are remembered in the name of Thomas Rotherham College.

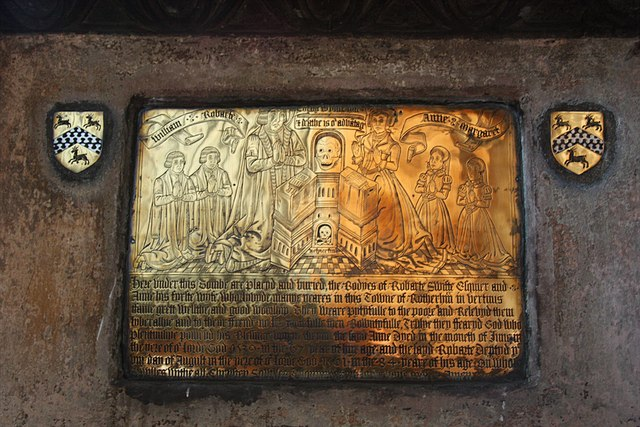
Memorial brass of the Swift family, All Saints Church, Rotherham, later owners of Broom Hall

Mary, Queen of Scots stayed in Rotherham for two nights at the end of January 1569. It has been suggested that she stayed in the college building. Two men, a Mr Lete and Mr Bayley, were paid for guarding her.

=== Industrial Revolution ===
The Rotherham area had been used for iron production since the Roman occupation of Britain. Toward the end of the 18th century, coal seams near the town made Rotherham an important settlement in the Industrial Revolution. Coal was exported from the town by river, and this led to infrastructure improvements in the River Don's navigability. The River Don eventually became an artery of the Sheffield and South Yorkshire Navigation system of navigable inland waterways.

During the early Industrial Revolution, iron, and later steel, became the principal industries in Rotherham, surviving into the 20th century. The Walker family built an iron empire in the 18th century, their foundries producing high quality cannons, including the majority of guns for the ship HMS Victory, and cast iron bridges, one of which was commissioned by Thomas Paine.

Rotherham's cast iron industry expanded rapidly in the early 19th century, with the Effingham Ironworks, later Yates, Haywood & Co, opening in 1820. Other major iron founders included William Corbitt and Co; George Wright and Co of Burton Weir; Owen and Co of Wheathill Foundry; Morgan Macauley and Waide of the Baths Foundry; the Masbro' Stove Grate Co belonging to Messrs. Perrot, W. H. Micklethwait and John and Richard Corker of the Ferham Works. G & WG Gummer Ltd exported brass products across the world, supplying fittings for hotels, hospitals, Victorian Turkish baths and the RMS Mauretania. Their fittings could also be found on battleships used in the Second World War and HMS Ark Royal.

The Parkgate Ironworks was established in 1823 by Sanderson and Watson, and changed ownership several times. In 1854, Samuel Beal & Co produced wrought iron plates for Isambard Kingdom Brunel's famous steamship the SS Great Eastern. In 1864, the ironworks was taken over by the Parkgate Iron Co. Ltd, becoming the Park Gate Iron and Steel Company in 1888. The company was purchased by Tube Investments Ltd in 1956 and closed in 1974. Steel, Peech and Tozer's massive Templeborough steelworks (now the Magna Science Adventure Centre) was, at its peak, over one mile (1.5 kilometres) long, employing 10,000 workers, and housing six electric arc furnaces producing 1.8 million tonnes of steel a year. The operation closed down in 1993.

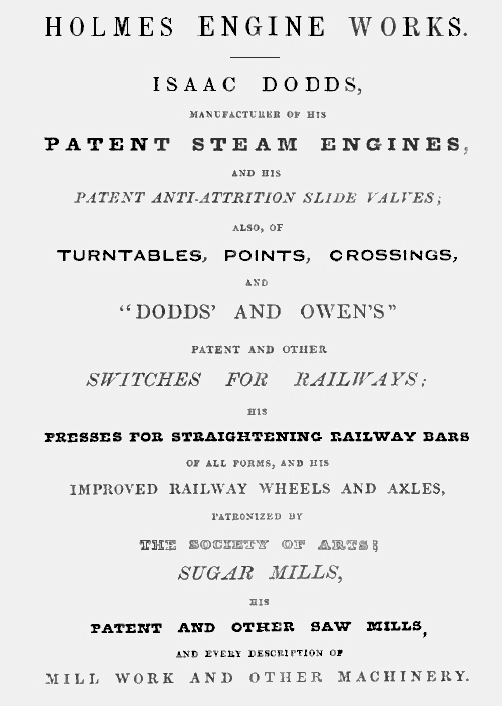
Holmes Engine Works advertisement, 1840

The first railway stations, Holmes and Rotherham Westgate, both on the Sheffield and Rotherham Railway, opened on 31 October 1838. Holmes station was located close to the works of Isaac Dodds and Son, pioneers in the development of railway technology. Later stations included Parkgate and Aldwarke on the Manchester, Sheffield and Lincolnshire Railway, which opened in July 1873; Parkgate and Rawmarsh on the North Midland Railway, and Rotherham Masborough also on the North Midland Railway.

Rotherham Forge and Rolling Mill occupied an island in the river known as Forge Island. Its managing director was Francis Charles Moss of Wickersley, until his death in 1942. The site was later occupied by a Tesco superstore and, by 2024, was the location of a new leisure development with an eight-screen cinema, food and drink outlets, and a hotel. Completion was initially scheduled for October 2021, but the project was delayed, with most facilities are opening during 2024.

Joseph Foljambe established a factory to produce his Rotherham plough which he patented in 1730, the first commercially successful iron plough.

A glass works was set up in Rotherham in 1751 and became Beatson Clark & Co, one of the town's largest manufacturers, exporting glass medicine bottles worldwide. Beatson Clark & Co was a family business until 1961, when it became a public company. The glass works operated on the same site, although the family connection ceased and the company is owned by Newship Ltd, a holding company linked to the industrialist John Watson Newman. It continues to the manufacture glass containers for the pharmaceutical, food and drinks industries. In the 19th century, other successful industries included pottery, brass making and the manufacture of cast iron fireplaces. Precision manufacturing companies in the town include AESSEAL, Nikken Kosakusho Europe, MTL Advanced, MGB Plastics and Macalloy. Rotherham is the location of the Advanced Manufacturing Park (AMP), which is home to a number of world-class companies including Rolls-Royce and McLaren Automotive.

The district abounds in mineral wealth; coal and iron ore are found in great profusion, and have been wrought from [long ago]. The town was formerly celebrated for its manufacture of edge tools; and in 1160, there were mines of ironstone, smelting-furnaces, and forges in the neighbourhood. But the most extraordinary establishments of this kind, of late years, were the iron-foundries belonging to Messrs. Walker, in which immense quantities of cannon of the largest calibre were wrought for government during the war, till the works were given up by the original proprietors, and let out to small capitalists. The spinning of flax affords employment to about 200 persons; there are manufactories for rope and for starch, a large malting establishment, two large ale and porter breweries, several oil and chemical works, and a glass-[making] house. Some other manufactories and works are noticed in the article on Masbrough. The Don, which is navigable to Sheffield, communicates with the river Aire on the north-east, with the Stainforth and Keadby canal on the east, with the Dearne and Dove canal and the Barnsley canal on the north-west, and consequently with the river Calder; by which means Rotherham enjoys [goods trade] with all the principal towns in the great manufacturing districts of Yorkshire and Lancashire. In 1836 an act was passed for making a railway to Sheffield, with a branch to the Greasbrough canal and coal-field; it was opened [in] 1838, and the distance is about six miles [10 km]....The market is on Monday, for corn, cattle, and provisions: on alternate Mondays is a celebrated market for fat-cattle, sheep, and hogs, numerously attended by grazers from distant parts of the country; and fairs take place on Whit-Monday and December 1st, for cattle. A court leet is held annually, at which constables and other officers for the internal regulation of the town are appointed

— A Topographical Dictionary of England, Samuel Lewis, 1848.

Milling grain into flour was a traditional industry in Rotherham, formerly in the Millmoor area, hence Rotherham United F.C.'s nickname "The Millers". Flour milling continued at the Rank Hovis town mill site on Canklow Road until September 2008. The site of the mill is now a warehousing and distribution facility for local logistics company, 4S Distribution.

=== Enterprise zone 1983 ===
In 1983, Rotherham became a designated enterprise zone with benefits and incentives given to attract new industry and development in the area. Within the first year, ten new companies were established within the zone. The former chemical works at Barbot Hall, which had been derelict, was developed into a new industrial estate and named 'Brookside', after Mangham Brook, which runs alongside it.

=== Floods of 2007 ===
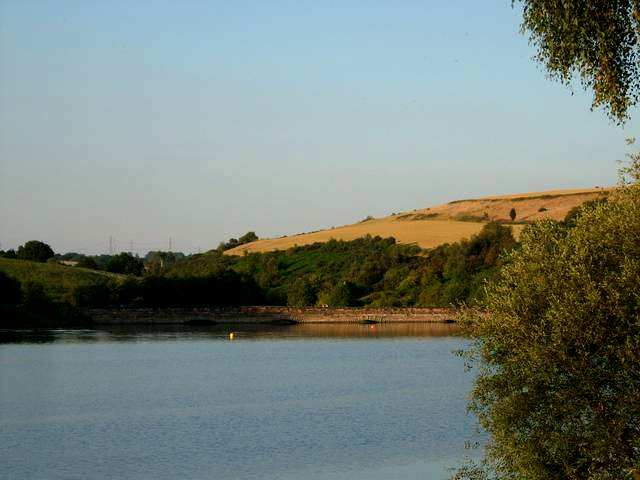
Ulley reservoir between Ulley and Aughton is in the south of the district

Rotherham was affected by flooding in the summer of 2007. This caused the closure of central roads, schools and transport services; it damaged residential and commercial property, including the Parkgate Shopping complex and the Meadowhall Centre, which suffered considerable internal water damage. Ulley Reservoir became a focus of major concern when its dam showed signs of structural damage, threatening to break and release water into the suburbs of Treeton, Brinsworth and Canklow as threatening the Junction 33 electrical sub-station. Thousands of homes were evacuated in response. Rother FM evacuated its studios, passing its frequency temporarily to neighbouring station Trax FM. A stretch of the M1 motorway was closed for three days due to the flood risk. Fire service and police officers used multiple high-powered pumps to lower the water level in the reservoir and reduce pressure on the dam wall, which was damaged but held. By summer 2008, the reservoir and surrounding country park reopened.

A new wetland and flood storage area, Centenary Riverside park, has since been built by Rotherham Council and the Environment Agency to prevent flooding in the future. The Wildlife Trust for Sheffield and Rotherham manages the site as a local nature reserve. The site is home to the massive sculpture Steel Henge, a Stonehenge replica which is in fact made from iron ingots.

=== Child sexual exploitation scandal ===
Following a 2012 article published in The Times newspaper revealing the cover-up of large-scale sexual abuse of young children by gangs of people of Pakistani origin in Rotherham, Rotherham Council commissioned Professor Alexis Jay, a former chief social work adviser to the Scottish government, to lead an independent inquiry about the handling of the cases and a suspected child exploitation network. She issued a report on the child sexual exploitation scandal that extended beyond the cases investigated by the police. Her report of August 2014 revealed an unprecedented scale of reported child sexual abuse within an urban area of this size over a 16-year period. Subsequently, Eric Pickles, the Secretary of State for Communities and Local Government, commissioned Louise Casey to conduct a best value investigation of Rotherham Council. She issued a report of her findings in February 2015.

Both reports stated that a majority of the known perpetrators were of Pakistani heritage. Casey noted that the severity of the issue had not been addressed, and to a large extent this was the responsibility of Councillors. Casey's report concluded that at the time of her inspection the council was not fit for the purpose, and identified necessary measures for preventing further repetition. On 4 February 2015, after receiving Casey's report, Pickles announced that commissioners would be appointed to run the council pending new elections, and the council leader and cabinet resigned en masse to allow for a 'fresh start'. The National Crime Agency was called in to investigate whether Rotherham councillors were complicit in hiding the depth and scale of the child abuse due to a "fear of losing their jobs and pensions" following a concern that they might be considered "racist" if they spoke out. According to the new report, the councillors were driven by "political correctness".

Jayne Senior, a former youth town worker, was reported to have worked for more than a decade to expose rampant child sexual abuse in Rotherham, but had been met with "indifference and scorn". Senior was awarded an MBE in the 2016 Birthday Honours.

== Landmarks ==
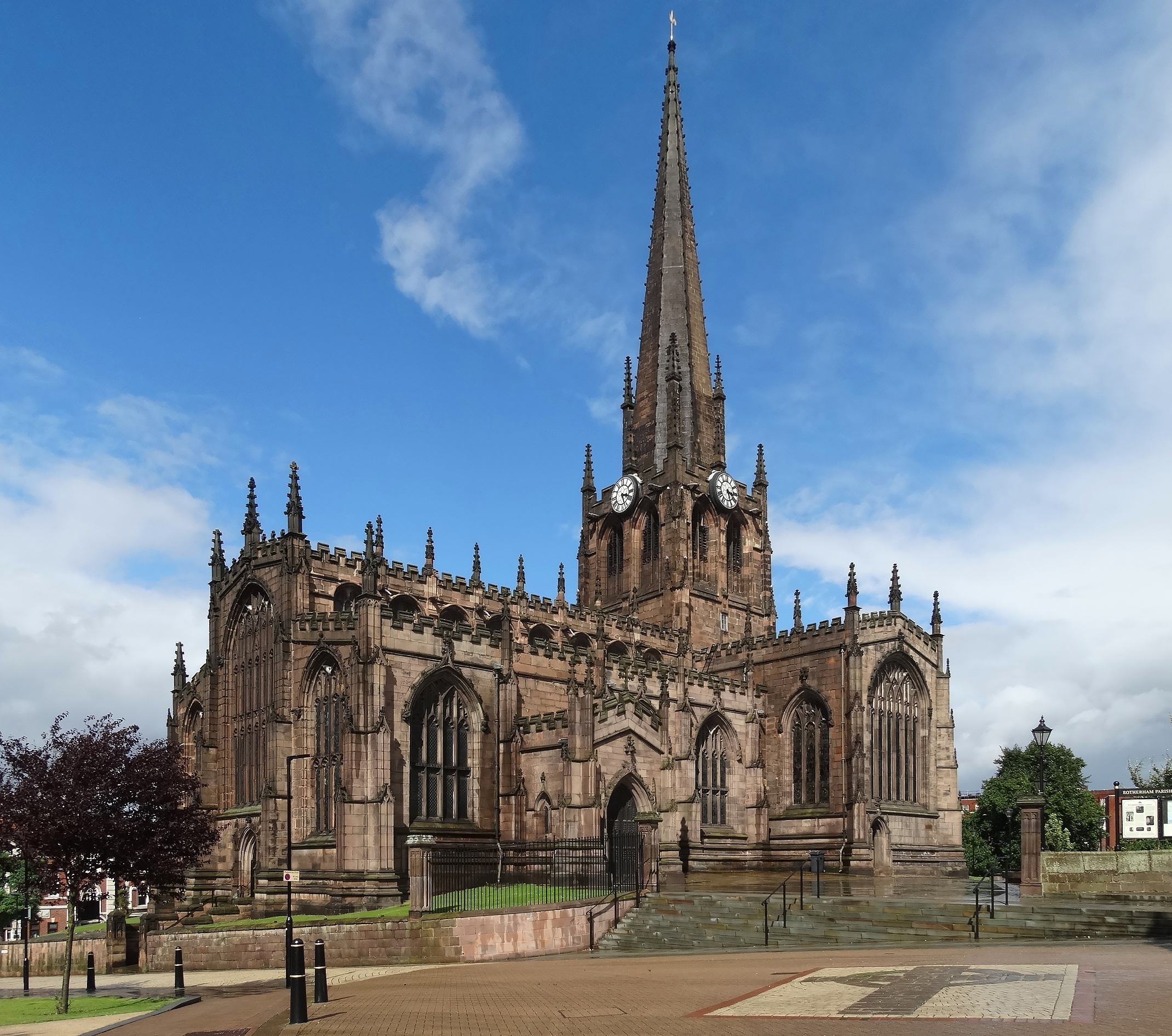
Rotherham Minster, the town's oldest and most prominent landmark

All Saints Minster, on a square of the same name, was built using neat-cut pieces made of a unique sandstone, Rotherham Red, with a low-pitched lead roofing. It is a Grade I listed building. A Belfry was added to the church in 1501 and today the Minster houses 13 bells. A church has stood on the site since before the Norman Conquest and the current building dates from the 15th century and includes parts from earlier Saxon and Norman structures. Clayton and Bell working to George Gilbert Scott's designs constructed the east window. Stained glass makers and designers A. Gibbs, Camm Brothers, Heaton, Butler and Bayne and James Bell are known makers of the other windows. Gargoyles flank its clock on each face. It has a "recessed octagonal spire with crocketed arrises and pinnacled shafts rising from corner faces and a gilded weathervane." Architectural critics Nikolaus Pevsner and Simon Jenkins considered it "the best perpendicular [style] church in the country" and "the best work in the county", respectively.

Close to the town centre is the 15th-century Chapel of Our Lady of Rotherham Bridge (or "Chapel on the Bridge"), beside Chantry Bridge (a road bridge opened in the 1930s). It is one of four surviving bridge chapels in the country. The chapel was restored in 1923, having been used as the town jail and a tobacconist's shop.

The town was once home to Jesus College, founded by Thomas Rotherham in the fifteenth century. The remains of the college's buildings are in the town centre, where some of the earliest examples of a brick-built structure remain although not accessible to the public. The gate to the College of Jesus can be found in nearby Boston Park.

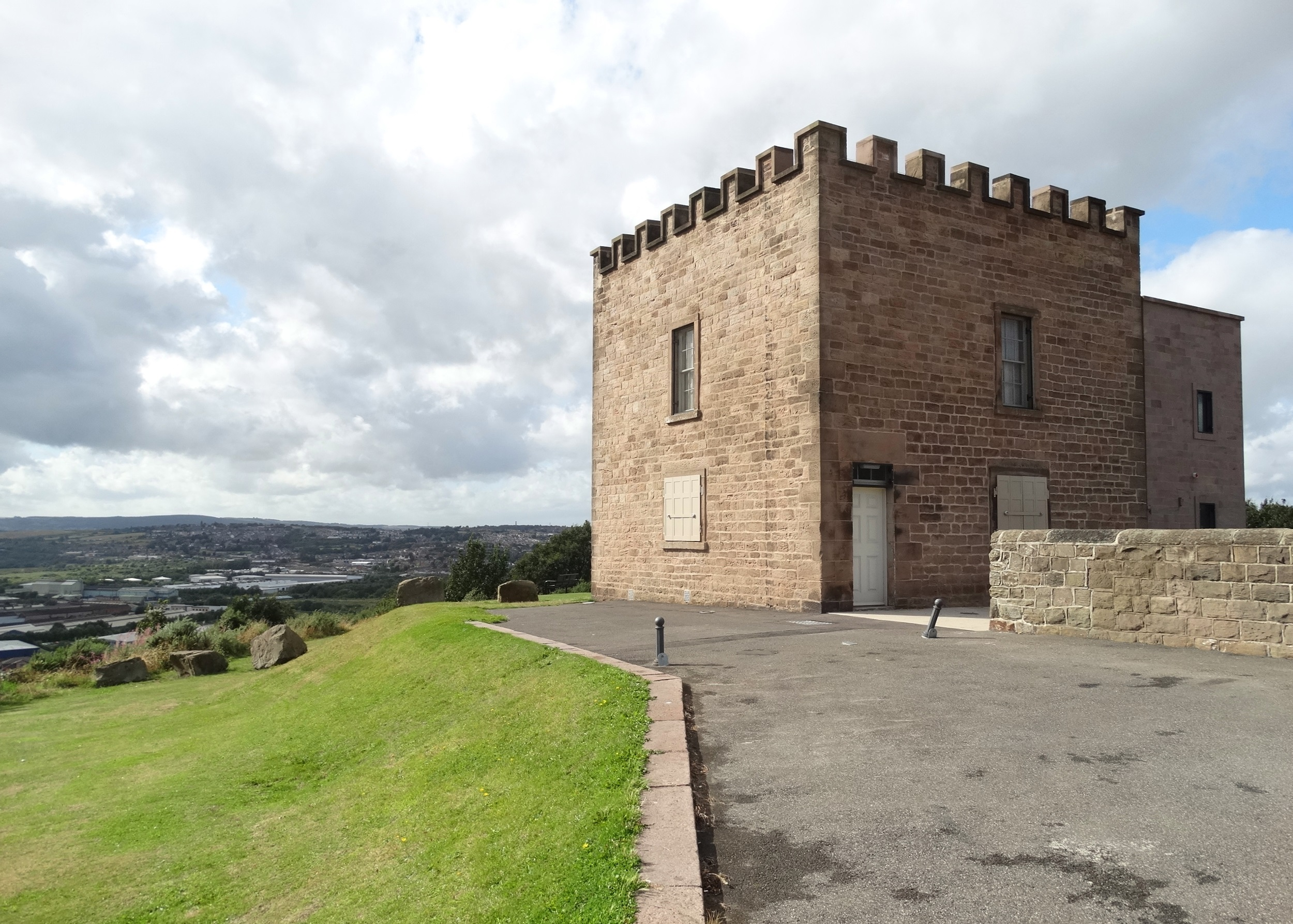
Boston Castle

Boston Castle, in the grounds of Boston Park, was built as a hunting lodge by Thomas Howard, 3rd Earl of Effingham between 1773 and 1774 to mark his opposition to British attempts to crush the Americans in their war for independence. It is named after Boston, Massachusetts, the scene of the Boston Tea Party.

Built in the 18th century, Clifton House houses Clifton Park Museum.

On the outskirts of Rotherham, a brick-built glass making furnace, the Catcliffe Glass Cone, is the oldest surviving structure of its type in Western Europe and one of four remaining in the United Kingdom – the others being the Red House Cone in the Wordsley centre of the Dudley Glassworks in the West Midlands, Lemington Glass Works west of Newcastle upon Tyne and Alloa in Scotland. Threatened with demolition in the 1960s, it has been preserved as a Scheduled Ancient Monument and stands as a focal point in a sheltered housing complex and close to the path leading up the Rother valley.

The ruins of Roche Abbey, south of Maltby and half-way to Worksop, have multi-storey walls, which is unusual. Most others abbey ruins of this age are no more than foundations or a single storey, following the dissolution of the monasteries in the 1530s.

== Education ==
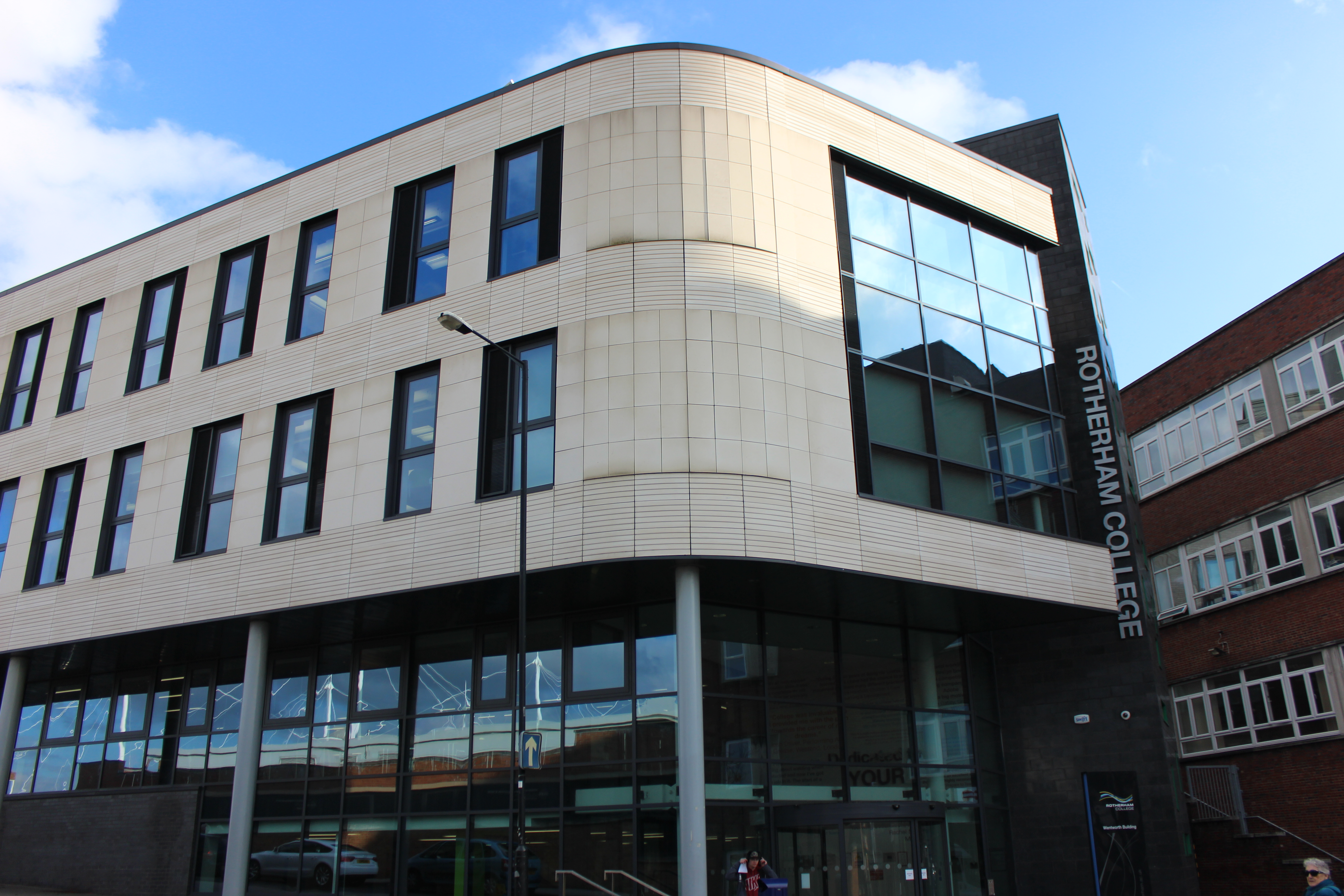
Rotherham College of Arts and Technology

Rotherham has three Further Education institutions and colleges. These are Thomas Rotherham College, Dearne Valley College and the Rotherham College of Arts and Technology. The Rotherham College of Arts and Technology has a campus in the Rotherham town centre and a second site in Dinnington, as well as a nearby, smaller campus for construction-based subjects, such as bricklaying.

== Governance ==
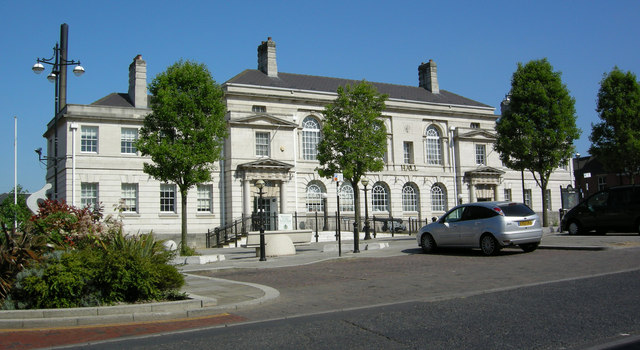
Rotherham Town Hall (originally the West Riding Courthouse; in civic use since 1985).

There is one main tier of local government covering Rotherham, at metropolitan borough level: Rotherham Metropolitan Borough Council. The borough council is also a member of the South Yorkshire Mayoral Combined Authority, led by the directly elected Mayor of South Yorkshire. Some outer parts of Rotherham are included in civil parishes, which form an additional tier of local government in these areas, but the central part of the built-up area is an unparished area.

=== Administrative history ===
Rotherham was an ancient parish. The parish was divided into eight townships: Brinsworth, Catcliffe, Dalton, Greasbrough, Kimberworth, Orgreave, Tinsley, and a Rotherham township covering the central part of the parish including the town. These townships were made civil parishes in 1866.

Until 1801, the parish was governed by its vestry and manorial courts, in the same way as most rural areas. More urban forms of local government began in 1801 when a body of improvement commissioners was established for Rotherham township, with responsibilities for paving, lighting, and repairing the streets. The commissioners were superseded in 1852 by an elected local board, whose district covered both the Rotherham and Kimberworth townships and had more extensive responsibilities, particularly relating to water supply and sewers.

The local board was replaced in 1871 when Rotherham was incorporated as a municipal borough. In 1902 it was elevated to become a county borough, taking over county-level functions from West Riding County Council.

The county borough was abolished in 1974 and replaced by the larger Metropolitan Borough of Rotherham, which also took in the areas of the abolished urban districts of Maltby, Rawmarsh, Swinton, and Wath upon Dearne, plus the Kiveton Park Rural District and Rotherham Rural District.

The Labour Party have controlled the authority since the 1974 incorporation of the Metropolitan Borough. Following the 2016 child sexual exploitation scandal, the way in which local councillors are elected in Rotherham changed, replacing annual rolling elections, with whole council elections every four years. This change coincided with notable boundary changes, which changed the political landscape of the borough. Rotherham's shadow cabinet local opposition is currently the Conservative Party with 18 seats. Independents hold one seat.

In the May 2021 election, Labour retained control of the council, while the Conservatives went from zero to 20 seats.

In 2013, Professor Alexis Jay published a report about the Rotherham child sexual exploitation scandal (1997–2013). Following the report's publication, the council leader, Roger Stone of the Labour Party, resigned – an act of contrition the report said should have been made years earlier – saying he would take full responsibility for "the historic failings described so clearly in the report." Labour Councillors Gwendoline Russell, Shaukat Ali and former council leader Roger Stone were suspended from the Labour Party, as was former Deputy Council Leader Jahangir Akhtar, who had lost his council seat in 2014. Chief Executive, Martin Kimber, said no council officers would face disciplinary action. Kimber announced on 8 September that he intended to step down in December 2014, and offered his "sincere apology to those who were let down". The council's director of children's services, Joyce Thacker, also left the authority by mutual agreement. Malcolm Newsam was appointed as Children's Social Care Commissioner in October 2014, and subsequently Ian Thomas was appointed as interim director of children's services.

Shaun Wright, the Police and Crime Commissioner (PCC) for South Yorkshire from 2012, was the Labour councillor in charge of child safety at the council from 2005 to 2010. He initially refused demands to resign as PCC from the Home Secretary, Theresa May, as well as members of his own party and local Labour MP Sarah Champion, saying: "I believe I am the most appropriate person to hold this office at this current time." He resigned from the Labour Party on 27 August 2014, after an ultimatum by the party to either resign or face suspension. Wright stood down as PCC on 16 September, saying that the prominence given to his role distracted from "the important issue, which should be everybody's focus – the 1,400 victims outlined in the report – and in providing support to victims and bringing to justice the criminals responsible for the atrocious crimes committed against them."

The former Chief Constable, Meredydd Hughes, who served from 2004 to 2011 and who had unsuccessfully stood for the Labour Party nomination in the Police Crime Commissioner elections, was told by Labour MP Keith Vaz that he had 'failed' abuse victims.

The inspector, Louise Casey, aided by seven assistant inspectors produced the Inspection Report on 4 February 2015. Following its conclusion that the council was not fit for purpose the minister directed that the powers of the council (RMBC) be transferred to his department and the cabinet would need to resign unless RMBC made sufficient representations within 14 days to contradict the report. The Secretary of State empowered a team of five Commissioners to replace councillors before a full election in 2016, declaring that the authority was not currently fit for purpose, and its powers would not revert until the dis-empowered councillors could prove their fitness to carry out all of the council's duties without intervention. One of the commissioners was appointed to specialise in child protection.

=== Constituencies ===
The Metropolitan Borough of Rotherham covers the constituencies of Rotherham (UK Parliament constituency) which has been held by the Labour Party since 1933; Wentworth and Dearne (UK Parliament constituency), held by Labour since the creation of the seat in 1983; and Rother Valley (UK Parliament constituency). When Rother Valley was won by the Conservatives in the 2019 General Election, this marked the first time the borough of Rotherham had returned anyone other than Labour MPs to Parliament since 1931.

Like most of South Yorkshire, the Rotherham constituencies are considered to be 'safe', having enjoyed 'substantial' majorities over a 'long' period of time; a typecast which heightens the incumbency factor present in first past the post elections. The constituency of Rotherham has been held by Labour MPs since a by-election in 1933. After the resignation and subsequent jailing of Denis MacShane in November 2012 due to expenses abuse, the by-election in 2012 saw Sarah Champion elected.

== Geography ==
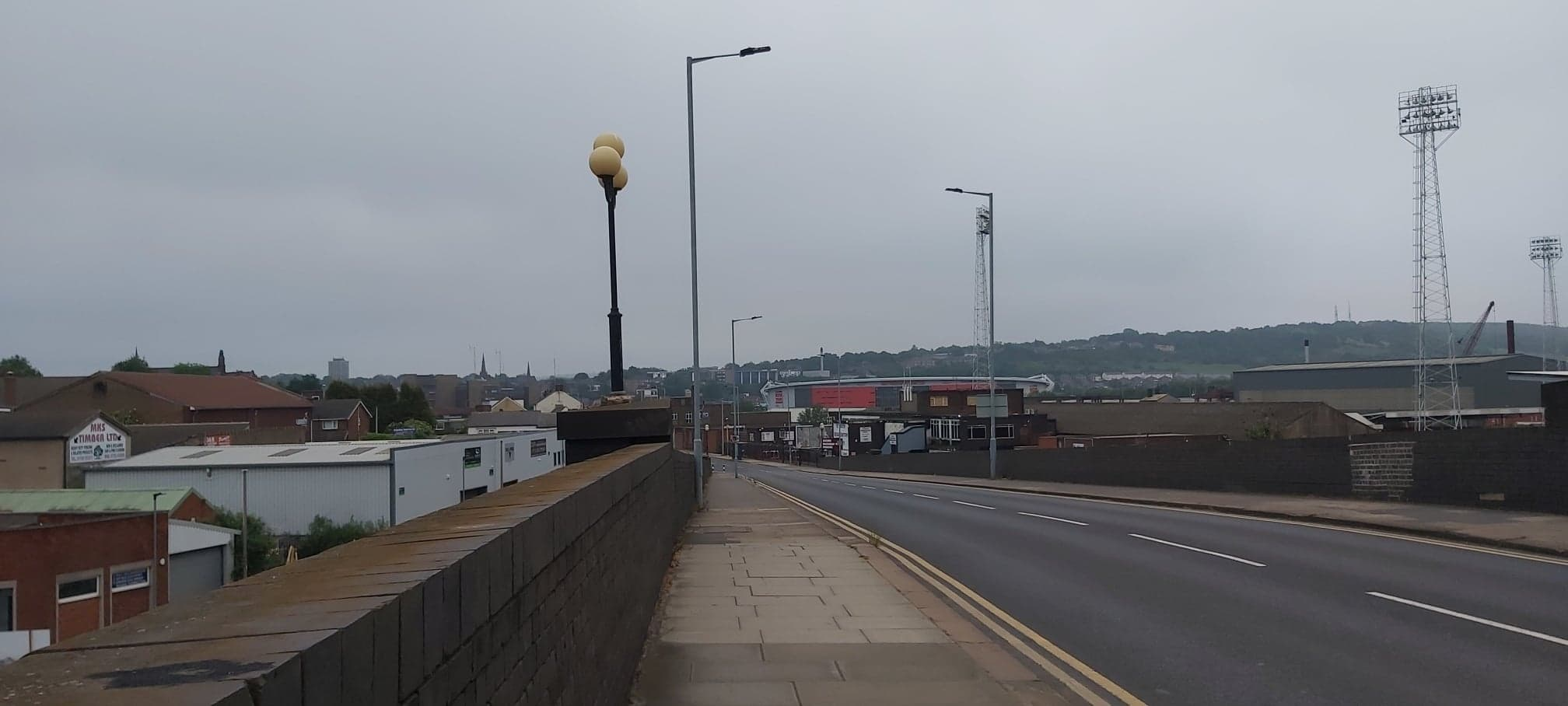
Rotherham Skyline from Coronation Bridge

Much of the town occupies the slopes of two hills. To the west is the start of a three-mile (five-kilometre) northwest crest topped by Keppel's Column, a folly; to the east is a narrower crest alongside the Rother known as Canklow Hill, topped by a public area, Boston Park. The Rother here is between 32 and 34 metres (105 and 112 feet) above sea level. The south scarp is slightly higher with the Canklow Hill Earthworks, a Scheduled Ancient Monument.

Rotherham's commercial town centre occupies the valley between these hills on the navigable part of the River Don. The town centre is less than 1/2 mile (800 metres) north of the confluence with the Rother flowing from the south. The Mid Don Valley continues adjoining towns in the north of the Metropolitan Borough.

Beyond the town centre and away from the Don Valley, the Rotherham district is largely rural, containing a mixture of retired people, larger properties, some farming and tourism and the landscaped Wentworth Woodhouse estate, where the last surviving kiln of the Rockingham Pottery can be seen.

=== Green belt ===
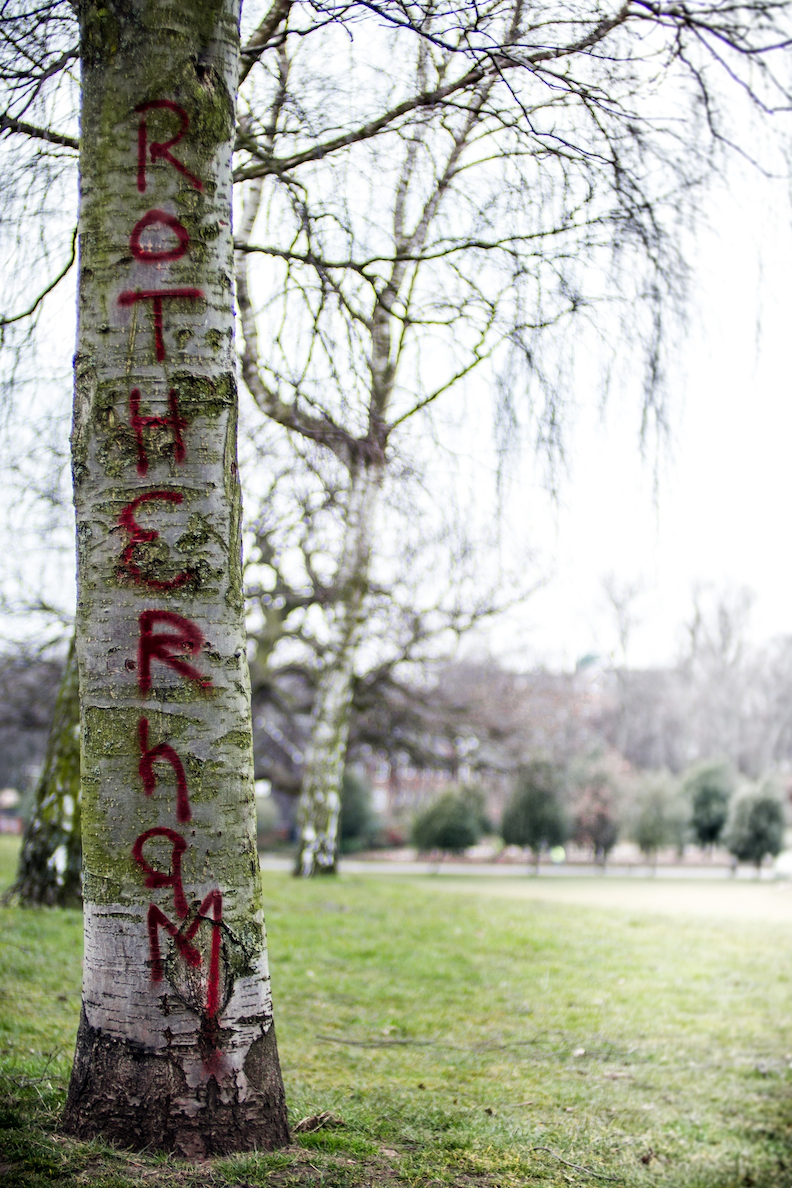
Clifton Park

Rotherham is within a green belt region that extends into the wider surrounding counties. It is in place to reduce urban sprawl, prevent the towns in the Sheffield conurbation from further convergence, protect the identity of outlying communities, encourage brownfield reuse and preserve nearby countryside.

The green belt was adopted in 1979, and the size in the borough in 2017 amounted to some 20,450 hectares (50,500 acres), covering 72% of the overall borough. The green belt surrounds the Rotherham urban area, with larger outlying towns and villages within the borough such as Treeton, Swallownest and Thurcroft exempted. Smaller villages, hamlets and rural areas such as Morthen, Ulley, Guilthwaite, Hooton Roberts and Old Ravenfield are within the green belt, minimising unsuitable development in these areas.

A subsidiary aim of the green belt is to encourage recreation and leisure, with rural landscape features, greenfield areas and facilities including the Wentworth Woodhouse estate and temple, River Rother, northern portions of the River Don and Hooton Brook, Pinch Mill Brook, golf courses, Ulley reservoir, Herringthorpe allotments, Rotherham Roundwalk and Sheffield Country Walk/Trans-Pennine trails, Thurcroft Hall, and Valley Park.

== Demography ==
In 2011, the urban population of Rotherham was 109,691. In 2014, it was about 110,550.

Rotherham compared 2011	Rotherham USD	Rotherham (Borough)
White British	85.6%	91.9%
Asian	8.3%	4.1%
Black	1.3%	0.8%

In 2011, 14.4% of Rotherham's population were non-white compared with 8.1% for the surrounding borough. Rotherham town has over double the percentage of Asian people compared with the Metropolitan Borough of Rotherham and a slightly larger percentage of black people. Rotherham has a large Pakistani population.

As of 2021, the town of Rotherham's population was 129,897, and its ethnic makeup was 86.1% White, 9% Asian, 1.7% Mixed, 1.5% Black, 1.2% Other and 0.5% Arab. The town's religious makeup was 49.2% Christian, 40.1% No Religion, 9.6% Muslim, and has small Hindu and Sikh communities.

== Transport ==
Rotherham Central station has a regular rail service operated by two train operating companies:

- Northern Trains services connect the town with Sheffield (in 14 minutes), Doncaster (in 25 minutes), Leeds, Wakefield Westgate and York
- TransPennine Express operates one service per day that stops here, from Cleethorpes to Liverpool Lime Street.

There are generally three South Yorkshire Supertram services per hour from Rotherham Central in each direction between Parkgate and Sheffield Cathedral.

== Culture and attractions ==
=== Museums ===
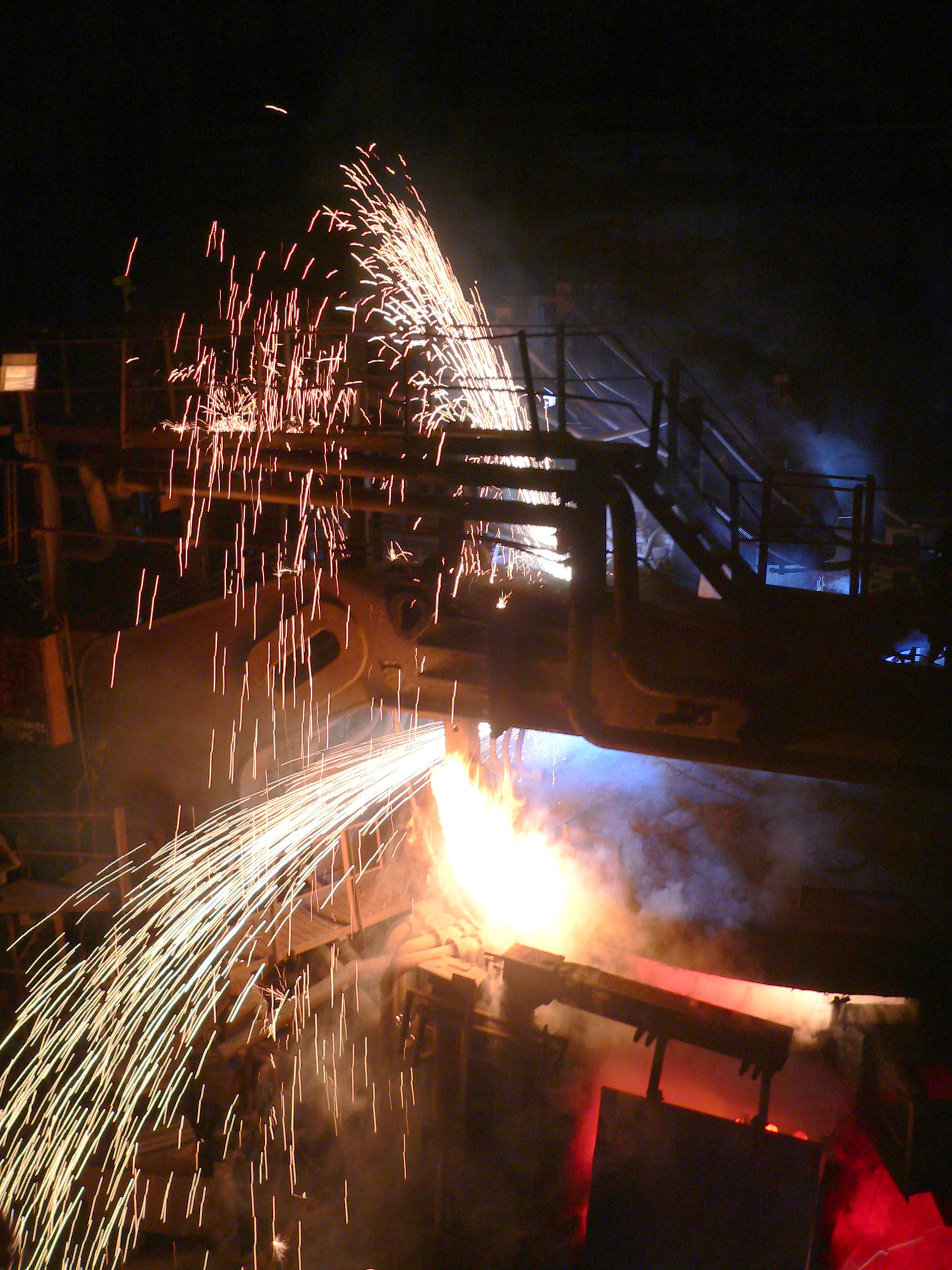
Furnace at the Magna Science Adventure Centre, Rotherham (October 2006)

The Magna Science Adventure Centre is an interactive science and adventure centre built in a former steel works in Templeborough. It has become one of the most popular tourist destinations in the region.

Clifton Park Museum is a medium-sized museum in Clifton Park.

=== Entertainment ===
The Civic Theatre and an Arts Centre is in the town centre.

The Westgate district of the town centre is the focal point of Rotherham's nightlife.

In 2015, the historic Three Crane Inn reopened on High Street in the town centre as an antiques shop. It closed in 2019, but reopened that year as a micropub. The Three Cranes Inn is Rotherham's oldest secular building and dates back to 1470.

In 2019, work began on the former Tesco site on Forge island to build a multiplex cinema, 4 restaurants, new urban public space and a hotel. The project, first mooted in the early 2000s experienced many delays and finally opened in 2024, more than 20 years after the scheme was proposed.

=== Events ===
Rotherham holds several public events through the year:

- The fashion show Rotherham Rocks takes place in All Saints Square in July
- Rotherham by the Sea is held in Clifton Park in August, which is transformed into a seaside beach with sand, deckchairs and other traditional seaside attractions
- The Rotherham Show is an annual event, held in Clifton Park, with stalls from all sectors of the community, shows and live bands in September
- The Rotherham Real Ale and Music Festival, hosted at the Magna Centre, is one of the UK's largest Real Ale festivals and typically runs over four days.

In 2016, Rotherham's first carnival took place; the People's Parade included over 400 people with costumes from Rampage, Luton – Batala a 50 piece Brazilian samba band and hundreds of local people, schools and community groups. The parade lead to a festival in the park with flags, decor Eh Up Rotherham sign, rides, stalls, DJ, bands, workshops and activities.

In 2022, Rotherham hosted the UEFA Women's Championship, at the New York Stadium.

As of 2025, Rotherham is the world's first Children's Capital of Culture.

=== Parks ===
Clifton Park, in the town centre, is a large park with sport facilities including an outdoor paddling pool, a small fairground and an adventure park. The park holds several events annually, including the great Rotherham show and annual fireworks display which both attract thousands of people each year.

Minster Gardens is an urban park in the heart of the town centre, next to Rotherham Minster and All Saints Square. It has an amphitheatre and space for open-air events, with stepped seating, lawns, grass terracing and a meadow area.

=== Music ===
Rotherham has several Brass band clubs. It has also produced many classic and progressive rock bands, supported by the Classic Rock Society, such as Jive Bunny, Bring Me the Horizon, The Reytons and Morris Minor and the Majors.

=== Shopping ===
Rotherham town centre has various chain stores. Following the availability of "Vitality Grants" from 2009 onwards, a number of new independent businesses opened in the town centre such as Yella Brick Road. In 2015, Rotherham won the Great British High Street award for its independent town centre shopping. Judges praised the transformation of key properties and the restoration of its "historic core". A plaque commemorating the award was unveiled by Secretary of State for Local Government & Committees Sajid Javid MP in September 2016. As of 2021, the retail sector in Rotherham has a thriving independent scene with a number of new start up businesses opening in the town centre. Due to the close proximity of Sheffield city centre, Meadowhall shopping centre and the Parkgate Retail Park, Rotherham has struggled to attract major brands.

=== Media ===
Rotherham has three community based local radio stations: Rotherham Radio, Rother Radio and Redroad FM.

The Rotherham Advertiser is the town's local newspaper.

== In film, art and literature ==
Film name	Scenes portrayed	Locations used	Genre
The Girl with the Pistol (1968)	Assunta meets John at the Bus Station	Frederick Street Bus Station, Rotherham (buildings redeveloped since)	Comedy
King Ralph (1991)	Miranda's mum's house in England. Allotments.	Dalton (scene buildings redeveloped since)	Comedy
I.D. (1995)	Centenary Market & Millmoor, Rotherham	As in reality	Police drama
When Saturday Comes (1996)	Outdoor scenes in 'Sheffield'	Outdoor scenes in Rotherham	Football and underdog drama
Brassed Off (1996)	Close-to-home concerts and parades for musicians	Rotherham town centre and district	Music-themed tragedy
Five Pillars (2013)	Opening credits sequence, school fight scene	Rotherham Bus Station, Eastwood, Wickersley	Social realist drama

Chef-writer Jamie Oliver's television series Jamie's Ministry of Food (2008) was based in Rotherham. He aimed to make Rotherham "the culinary capital of the United Kingdom" by his 'Pass it on' scheme, teaching groups some of which went on to work in restaurants. The project closed in 2017.

The Arctic Monkeys' song "Fake Tales of San Francisco" has a tribute line: "Yeah I'd love to tell you all my problem. You're not from New York City, you're from Rotherham."

The 2013 film Five Pillars was largely set and filmed in the town.

== Sport ==
=== Football ===
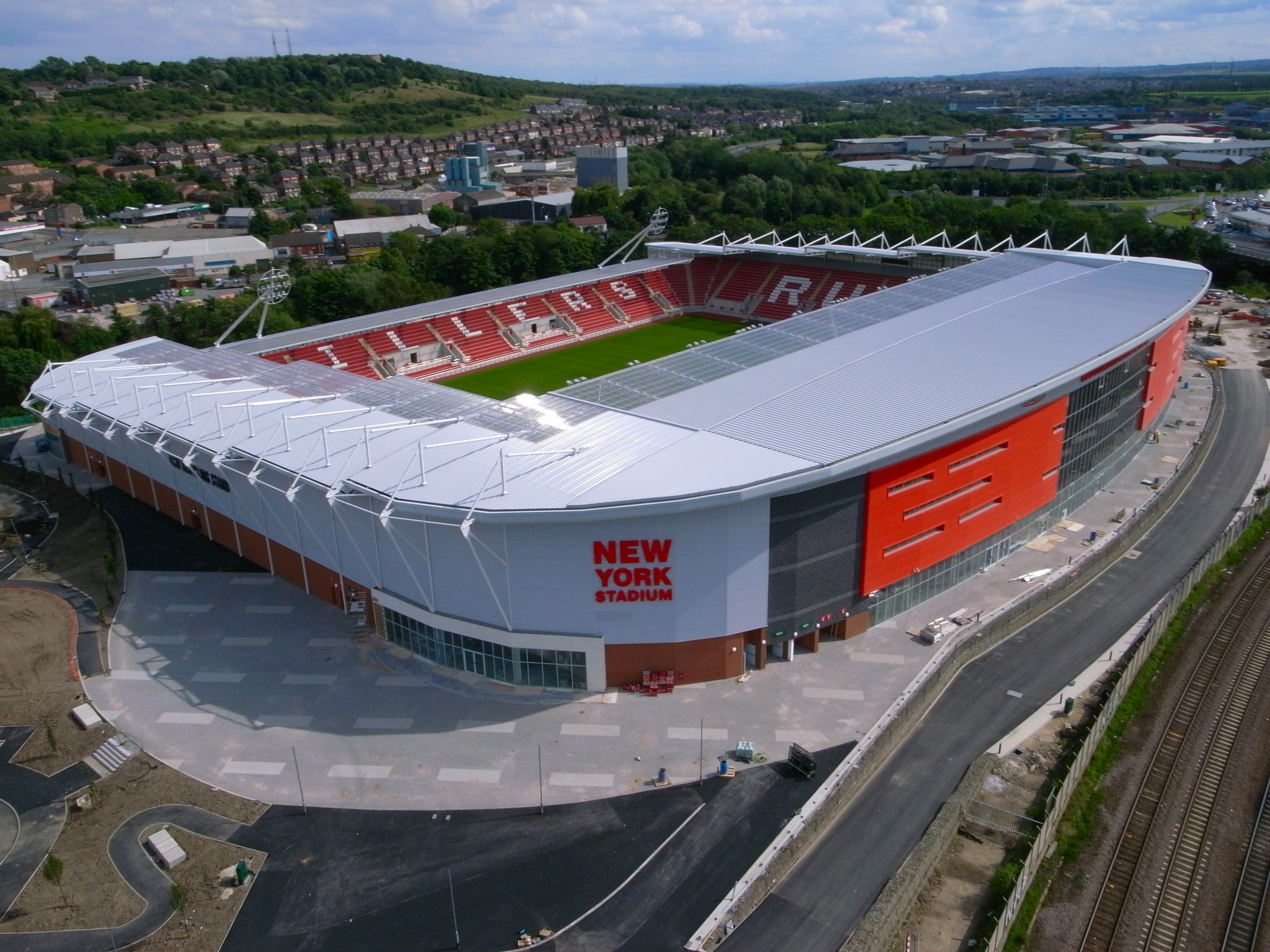
New York Stadium, home of Rotherham United F.C.

In the 2026–27 season, the town's association football team, Rotherham United, plays in the EFL League Two, the fourth tier of English football. The team currently plays at the New York Stadium. Historically the town was represented by Rotherham Town and Rotherham County, which both played in the Football League.

=== Rugby ===
Rotherham Titans rugby union team reached the Guinness Premiership in 1999 and 2003 before being relegated. The club plays at the Clifton Lane Sports Ground. The town is also represented in rugby league by the Rotherham Giants of the Rugby League Conference.

=== Cricket ===
Rotherham Town Cricket Club is an English amateur cricket club with a history dating back to 1846. The club ground is based on Clifton Lane. The club have 2 Saturday senior XI teams that compete in the Yorkshire Cricket Southern Premier League, and a junior training section that play competitive cricket in the Sheffield and District Junior League.

=== Motor racing ===
Former Formula One team Virgin Racing were based in Dinnington in the borough. IndyCar and former ChampCar and Formula One driver Justin Wilson was from Woodall, which is in the Metropolitan Borough of Rotherham. Motorcycle speedway racing was staged at the greyhound racing stadium in Hellaby between May 1929 and April 1930.

=== Greyhound racing ===
Three greyhound racing tracks existed in or around the town. They were Rotherham Greyhound Stadium (1933–1974); around Millmoor (1930–1933) and in Hellaby. The racing was independent (not affiliated to the sports governing body the National Greyhound Racing Club) and all three tracks were known as flapping tracks, which was the nickname given to independent tracks.

=== Notable sportspeople ===
Hurdler Chris Rawlinson, Olympic gold medallist sailor Paul Goodison, Olympic silver medallist Peter Elliott, former England goalkeeper David Seaman, golfer Danny Willett and 2010 FIFA World Cup Final referee Howard Webb are all from Rotherham.

== Freedom of the Borough ==
=== Individuals ===
- Julie Kenny: March, 2021
- Gavin Walker: 12 January 2022.

=== Military Units ===
- On 3 August 2009, Rotherham became the first town to bestow the Freedom of the Borough on the Yorkshire Regiment, giving it the right to march through the town with "flags flying, bands playing and bayonets fixed". At a ceremony outside Rotherham Town Hall, the Regiment paraded two Guards of soldiers who had recently returned from Iraq and the Colours of the 3rd Battalion Yorkshire Regiment (Duke of Wellington's), led by the Kings Division Band, under the command of Lieutenant Colonel Vallings, the battalion commanding officer. The Mayor of Rotherham, Councillor Shaukat Ali, on behalf of the borough, presented the Freedom Scroll to Colonel Simon Newton, who accepted the honour for the regiment. The regiment is the only military unit to become Honorary Freemen of the Borough.

== Notable people ==
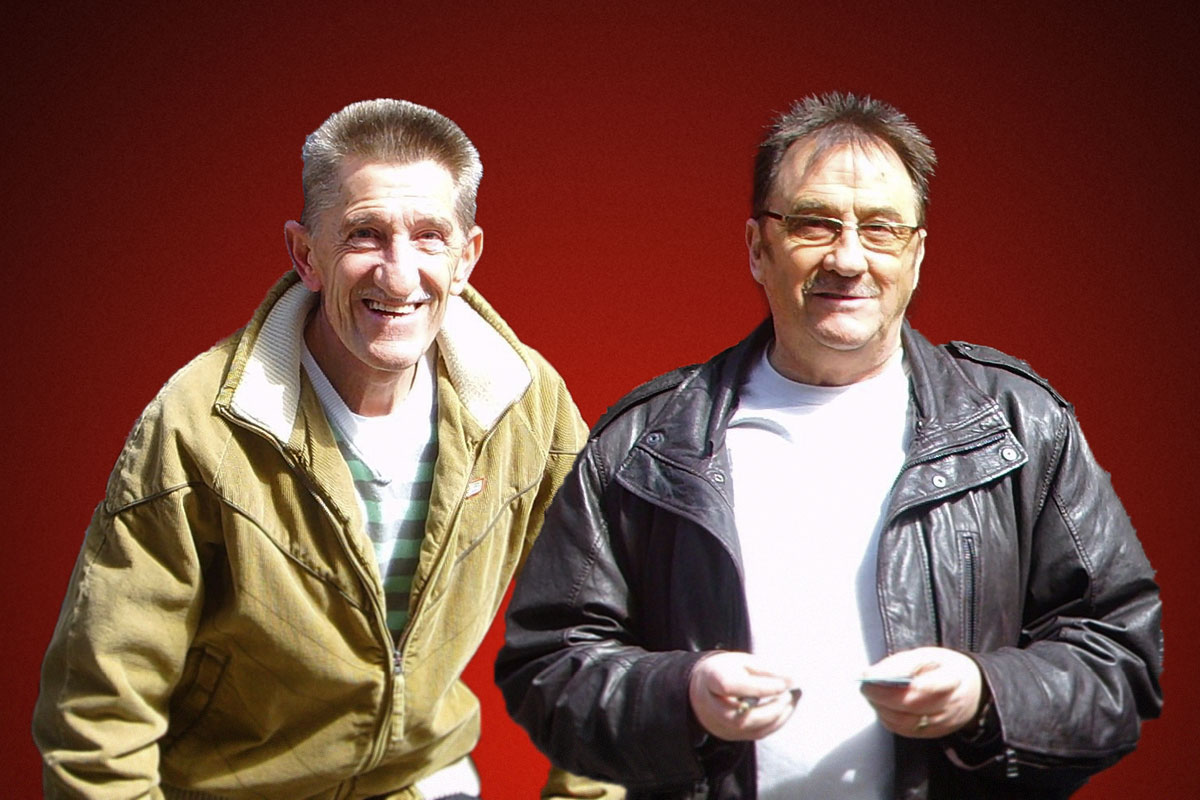
Rotherham is the home of Paul and Barry Elliott (generally known as the Chuckle Brothers).

Rotherham is the home town of the Chuckle Brothers, Manchester City and England forward Jess Park, Huddersfield Town and Arsenal manager, Herbert Chapman (born in Kiveton Park, which was amalgamated into Rotherham in 1974), Arsenal and England goalkeeper David Seaman, along with World Cup and English Premier League referee Howard Webb and gymnast Ella-Mae Rayner. Sean Bean began his acting career in Rotherham while actors Liz White, Ryan Sampson, Dean Andrews and Darrell D'Silva also hail from Rotherham, as does former leader of the Conservative Party, William Hague, and Sir Donald Coleman Bailey. Presenter James May grew up in Rotherham; his co-presenter on Top Gear Jeremy Clarkson trained to be a journalist at the Rotherham Advertiser.

Comedians Sandy Powell and Duggie Brown were born in Rotherham, as was actress Lynne Perrie. Chris Wolstenholme of Muse, DJ Kritikal Mass, Dean Andrews of Life on Mars, artist Margaret Clarkson, band Jive Bunny & The Mastermixers, musician Rebecca Taylor and singer-actor Rob McVeigh were all born or mostly raised in Rotherham.

== Twin towns ==
Rotherham's official twin town is:

- Saint-Quentin, Aisne, France.

It also has three partner towns:

- Cluj-Napoca, Romania
- Riesa, Germany
- Zabrze, Poland

== See also ==
- Listed buildings in Rotherham (Boston Castle Ward)
- Rotherham Tramway
- Trolleybuses in Rotherham
