= Listed buildings in Catcliffe =

Catcliffe is a civil parish in the Metropolitan Borough of Rotherham, South Yorkshire, England. The parish contains two listed buildings that are recorded in the National Heritage List for England. Of these, one is listed at Grade I, the highest of the three grades, and the other is at Grade II, the lowest grade. The parish contains the village of Catcliffe, and the listed buildings consist of a glass cone and a farmhouse.

== Key ==
Grade	Criteria
I	Particularly important buildings of more than special interest
II	Buildings of national importance and special interest

== Buildings ==
Name and location	Photograph	Date	Notes	Grade
Catcliffe Glass Cone; 53.39268°N 1.36168°W		c. 1740	The glass cone is in brick on a sandstone plinth, and consists of a large cone about 20 metres (66 ft) high, open at the top. It contains openings around the base, some with segmental heads, and others with round-arched heads.	I
Manor Farmhouse; 53.39337°N 1.35871°W	—	18th century	The farmhouse is in sandstone on a plinth, with chamfered quoins, and a Welsh slate roof with chamfered gable copings and shaped kneelers. There are two storeys and an attic, and an L-shaped plan, consisting of a three-bay range, and a rear wing on the right. The doorway has an architrave and a cornice, the windows are casements, and at the rear is a two-light mullioned stair window.	II
