= Catcliffe =

Village and civil parish in South Yorkshire, England

Coordinates: 53.39163°N 1.36240°W

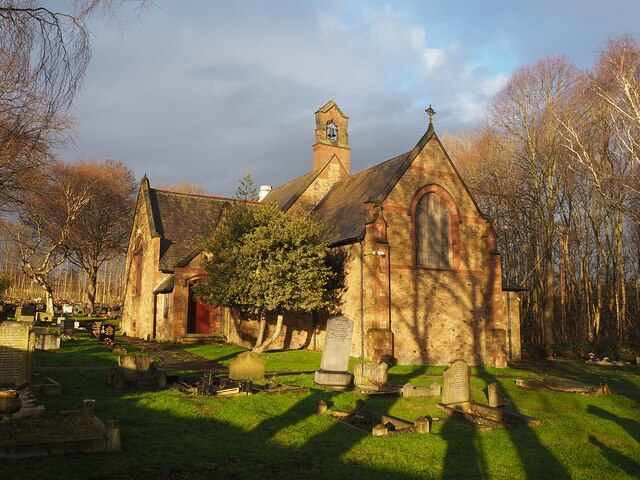
- St Mary's Church, Catcliffe

- Location within South Yorkshire
- Population: 2,108 (2011 Census)
- OS grid reference: SK425885
- Civil parish: Catcliffe
- Metropolitan borough: Rotherham
- Metropolitan county: South Yorkshire
- Region: Yorkshire and the Humber
- Country: England
- Sovereign state: United Kingdom
- Post town: ROTHERHAM
- Postcode district: S60
- Dialling code: 01709
- Police: South Yorkshire
- Fire: South Yorkshire
- Ambulance: Yorkshire
- UK Parliament: Rotherham
- Website: Catcliffe Parish Council

Catcliffe is a village and civil parish on the north-west bank of the River Rother in South Yorkshire, England. The population of the civil parish at the 2011 census was 2,108. It is in the Metropolitan Borough of Rotherham, approximately 2.5 miles (4 km) south of the town of Rotherham and 4.3 miles (7 km) east of Sheffield City Centre.

== History ==
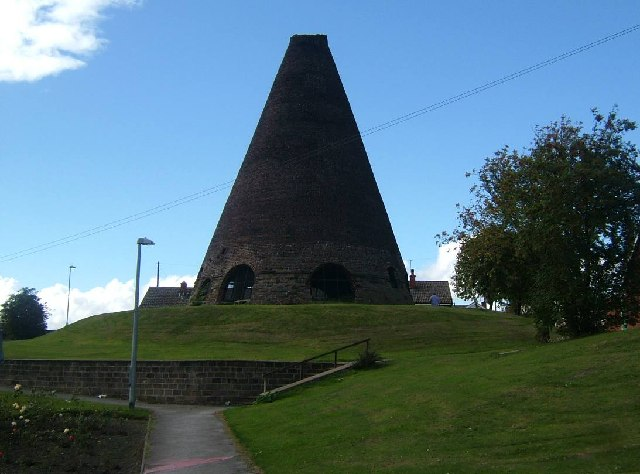
The glass cone at Catcliffe

Catcliffe is mentioned in the Domesday Book, its name is presumed to mean either the cliff where the cats live, or steep river bank. In 1740 William Fenney established a glassworks here. The site was chosen, among other reasons, for being 10.5 miles (17 km) away from Fenney's glassworks in Bolsterstone, formerly owned by his mother-in-law—the terms of her will prevented him from setting up a glassworks within 10 miles of the town. One of the cones of this glassworks still exists and is the oldest surviving structure of its type in Western Europe. It is a Grade I listed building and a Scheduled Ancient Monument.

On 25 June 2007 the village was evacuated because of fears that cracks in the dam at Ulley reservoir could lead to widespread flooding in the valley.

Catcliffe railway station opened on 30 April 1900 and closed on 11 September 1939.

== Governance ==
Catcliffe is a civil parish and local issues are governed by a parish council, one of 29 such councils in the Metropolitan Borough of Rotherham. It is in the Brinsworth and Catcliffe Ward which is represented on the borough council (as of 2018) by three councillors, one each from the Labour Party, UKIP and Liberal Democrats. This ward is part of the Rotherham parliamentary constituency, no longer a Labour Party safe seat, and is presently represented in the House of Commons by Sarah Champion MP who has held the seat since a by-election in 2012 when the previous incumbent Denis MacShane resigned over an expenses scandal.

== Geography ==
Catcliffe is on the west side of the River Rother, about 2.5 miles (4 km) south of the town of Rotherham and 4.3 miles (7 km) east of Sheffield City Centre. The village sits on the floor of the Rother Valley, ranging from about 30 metres (98 ft) to 50 metres (160 ft) above mean sea level. The village is susceptible to flooding and was badly affected by the floods of June 2007 and again in the Storm Babet floods of October 2023.

== Demography ==
At the time of the United Kingdom 2001 Census the population of Catcliffe civil parish was 1,766 people. The ethnic mix was 98.9% white (White British, White Irish, or White Other), 0.3% Black British, 0.2% Asian, and 0.6% mixed race.

Below is a table outlining population change of the parish since 1801.

Year	1801	1871	1901	1951	2001
Population	135	336	1,232	2,048	1,766
Source: A Vision of Britain through Time

== Landmarks ==
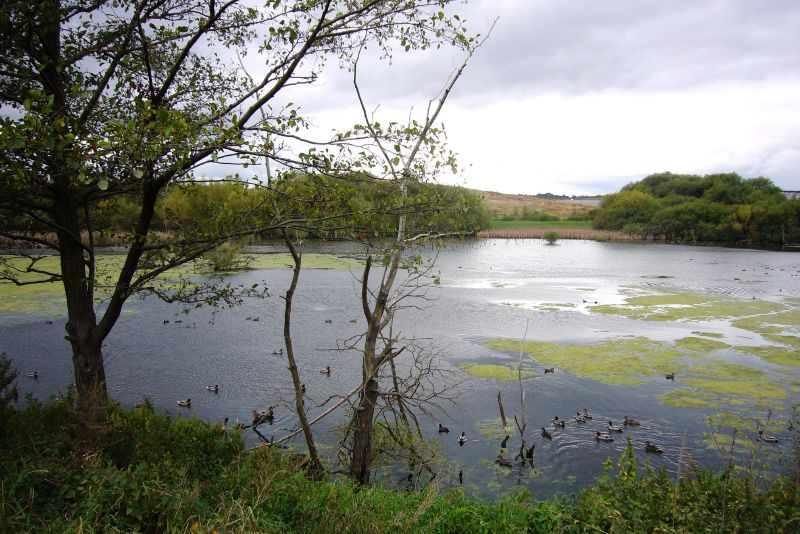
Catcliffe Flash

The Catcliffe Glass Cone, part of the previous William Fenney's glassworks, is on Main Street. The centre of the village is dominated by a nine-arch viaduct that was built in 1901 to carry the Sheffield District Railway across the River Rother. Catcliffe Flash, to the south of the village, is a local nature reserve that is made up of a lake and marshland formed as the elevation of the land beside the River Rother dropped due to coal mining subsidence.

== Transport ==
Catcliffe is bisected by the A630 Sheffield Parkway, close to junction 33 of the M1 motorway. Bus services provided by First South Yorkshire and TM Travel link the village with Rotherham Town Centre and Sheffield City Centre as well as the surrounding villages. The closest mainline railway stations are at Sheffield, Rotherham, and Meadowhall. The Sheffield District Railway ran through the village, and there was a passenger station at Catcliffe railway station from 1900 to 1939.

== Sports ==
The village had its own football team, Catcliffe F.C., which played in the FA Cup during the 1900s.

== Notable people ==
Former English footballer Gordon Banks was born in Catcliffe. His nephew Nick Banks, drummer for the band Pulp, now runs a pottery in the village. Pulp used to rehearse in Catcliffe and wrote the song Catcliffe Shakedown, which portrays the village in a negative light.

== See also ==
- Listed buildings in Catcliffe
