= Northern Glass Cone, Alloa Glass Works =

Northern Glass Cone
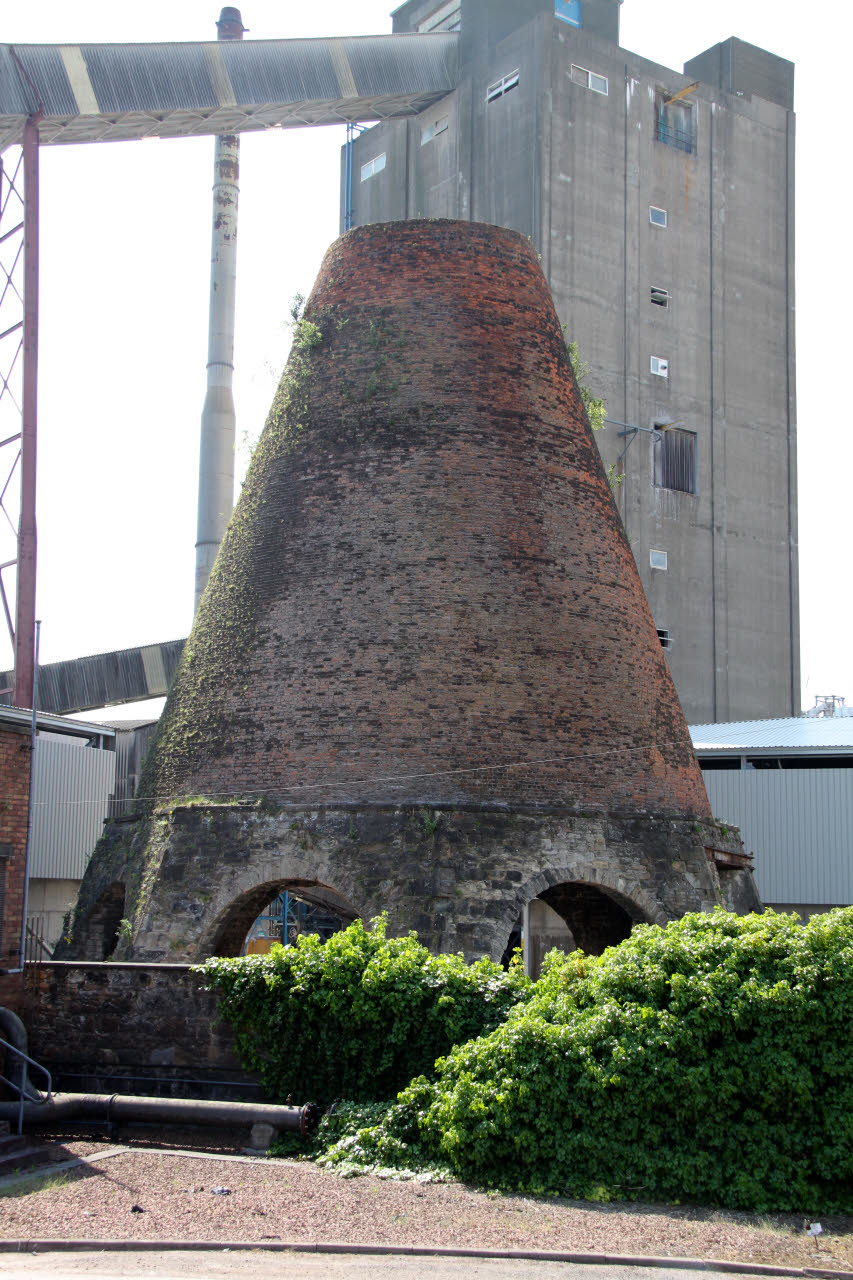
- The glass cone is in the grounds of the Alloa Glass Works

- The glass cone shown within Scotland
- 56.1113°N 3.8025°W
- Location: Alloa Glass Works, Glasshouse Loan, Alloa, Clackmannanshire FK10 1PD

History
- Built: c. 1825
- Built for: Edinburgh Glasgow and Alloa Glass Company

Scheduled monument
- Official name: Alloa Glass Works, glass cone
- Designated: 10 November 1975
- Reference no.: SM3746

The Northern Glass Cone is a 19th-century glass cone formerly used in the glass manufacturing process at Alloa Glass Works in the burgh of Alloa, the administrative centre of the central Scottish council area of Clackmannanshire. The brick-built cone is the only such structure to survive in Scotland, and is one of four in the United Kingdom: the other three are at Lemington on Tyneside, Catcliffe in South Yorkshire and Wordsley in the West Midlands. It is a Scheduled Ancient Monument.

== History ==
Alloa Glass Works was established in 1750 by Lady Frances Erskine. Workers were trained by craftsmen from Bohemia (in the present-day Czech Republic), who also oversaw the construction of the first glass cone on the site. This structure was 90 feet (27 m) tall.

By 1825, the Edinburgh Glasgow and Alloa Glass Company owned the site; they built another three cones, of which the Northern cone, 79 feet (24 m) high, was one. (Its immediate neighbour was correspondingly known as the Southern cone.) The base was octagonal, rather than circular, and had arched entrances. The main body of the cone was of brick laid in English Bond formation. The original cone and one other were demolished before the 1960s, but the Southern cone survived until 1968. At the same time, the Northern cone regained its original appearance when some later additions were removed.

== Purpose ==
Although glassmaking is an ancient process, it was carried out on a small scale until the development of industrialised methods in Europe allowed it to be mass-produced. The fusion of silica and sodium oxide in a furnace was usually achieved by the burning of wood; but coal was often used instead in Britain, which prompted the development of the glass cone. Glass cones consisted of a large central furnace, a flue to carry waste gas to the top of the structure and away, smaller furnaces around the walls to ensure the finished products stayed warm, and a circular platform on which workers stood while making their glassware. Although invented earlier, they became commonplace in the early 19th century; but further innovations in the glassmaking industry made the float glass production method more efficient and allowed manufacture to be based in fewer but larger works. Most cones were knocked down after they fell out of use, and by the mid-1970s only four survived: the Alloa cone (the only example in Scotland), Catcliffe Glass Cone in South Yorkshire, Lemington Glass Cone in Tyne and Wear, and Red House Cone in Wordsley, West Midlands.

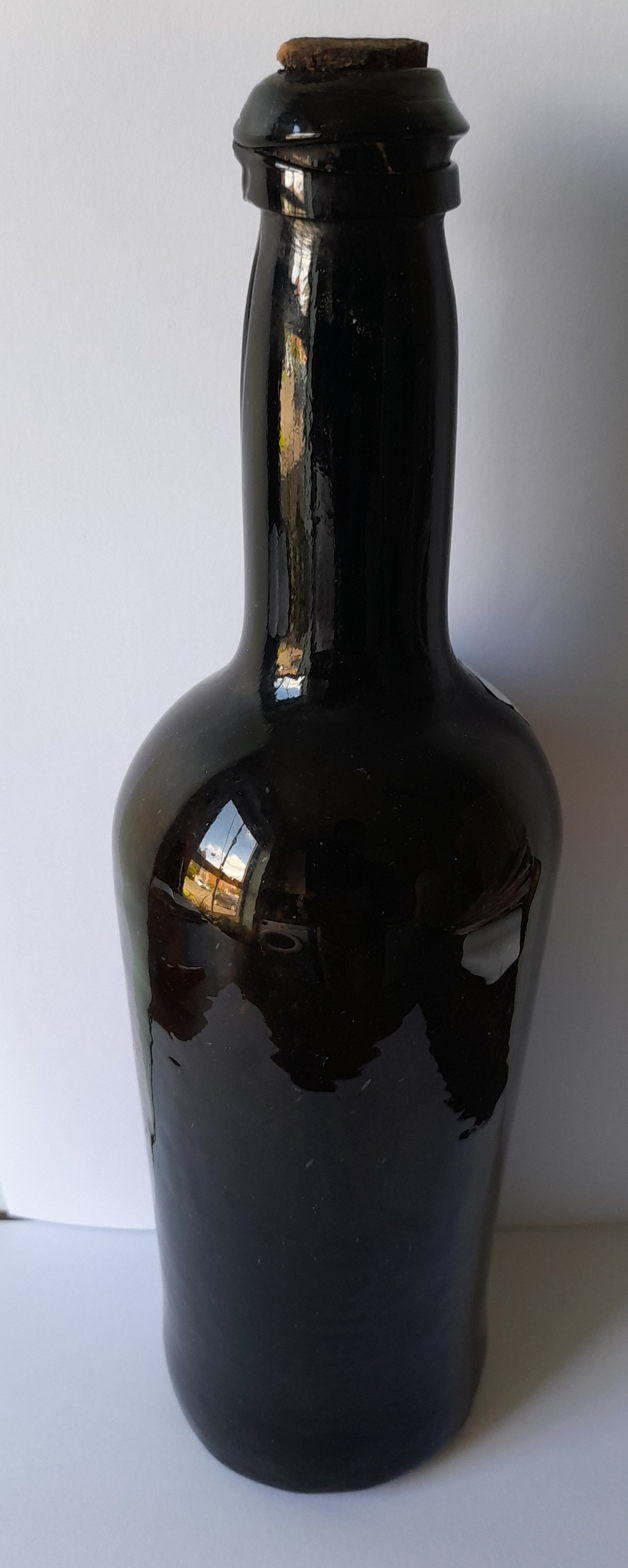
Hand blown Alloa glass port or wine bottle, early C19th with original cork & traces of sediment. Acquired from cellar in Montrose. 29 cm height.

== Historic status ==
On 10 November 1975, the structure was given the status of a scheduled ancient monument in accordance with the Ancient Monuments Acts of 1913 and 1931. It is one of 17 scheduled ancient monuments in Clackmannanshire.
