= Lemington Glass Works =

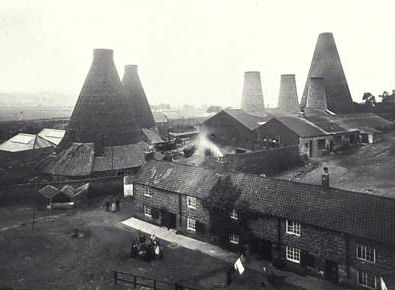
- Lemington Glass Works c.1900

- Location in Tyne and Wear

General information
- Type: Glass Works
- Location: Lemington, Newcastle upon Tyne, Tyne and Wear
- Coordinates: 54.979°N 1.717°W
- OS grid: NZ182649
- Current tenants: Land Rover; Stanegate Cookers and Stoves
- Completed: 1787
- Demolished: Partly in 1837 and 1997

Height
- Height: 35 m (115 ft)

Dimensions
- Diameter: 21 m (69 ft)

Design and construction
- Main contractor: Northumberland Glass Company

Lemington Glass Works was the site of glass production in Lemington, Newcastle upon Tyne, England, for over 200 years. All that remains now is its iconic last glass cone, a famous local landmark.

== History ==
Lemington Glass Works were opened in 1787 by the Northumberland Glass Company in the village of Lemington 3.5 miles (5.6 km) west of Newcastle upon Tyne. The land was leased to them by the Duke of Northumberland. At first their four large cones only produced flat glass. The location of the works was ideal for local coal supplies, with the North Wylam to Lemington Point Waggonway running within very close proximity to the works. It was also situated beside the River Tyne (prior to its rerouting in 1876) which made it easy to bring sand, alkali, and suitable clay for the melting pots to the works. In 1837 three of the glass cones were demolished as the Northumberland Glass Company relinquished their ownership of the works. Between 1838 and 1845 the glass works were owned by Joseph Lamb & Co. After this period there was a decline in the glass industry and operations at Lemington were further reduced. Between 1898 and 1906 the works were owned by Sowerby & Co, which led to full scale glass production being reinstated in the works. In 1906 ownership passed to the General Electric Company, who expanded the works and adapted it for the production of light bulbs and glass tubes. During the 1950s there was an introduction of new furnaces and machinery, followed by another decline, resulting in machine production being halted. In 1977 Amber Films made a film of the works called "Glassworks", which included various aspects of commercial glass manufacture; tube drawing by hand, the manufacture of a melting pot on the premises, and the dramatic pot changing process. In 1997 production of glass in the works was stopped. It was the last working glassworks of its type. With closure, all buildings except for the cone were demolished.

== The Glass Cone ==
The only surviving element of the former glassworks site is a large English bond brick-built glass cone, standing over 35 m (115 ft) high, and 21 m (69 ft) in diameter. This particular cone was built in 1797 and was the largest of the works' four cones, having been constructed from an estimated 1.75 million bricks. In the south and west sides of the cone are five segmental arches, with two smaller arches to the north. A door has been inserted on the northwest side because the cone is now used as a showroom by car manufacturer Land Rover and Stanegate Stoves. It is still owned by GB Glass Bulbs Ltd. This imposing structure is one of the most important industrial monuments in the North East and is a Grade II* listed building. The survival of this cone is one of only four such survivals in the United Kingdom. The other surviving cones can be found in Wordsley in the West Midlands, Catcliffe in South Yorkshire and Alloa in Scotland. The cone was cleaned and reappointed in 1993 by English Heritage and Newcastle City Council.

== See also ==
- Lemington
- Lemington Power Station
- Stella power stations
