= Red House Cone =

Coordinates: 52.476168°N 2.157235°W

Red House Glass Cone
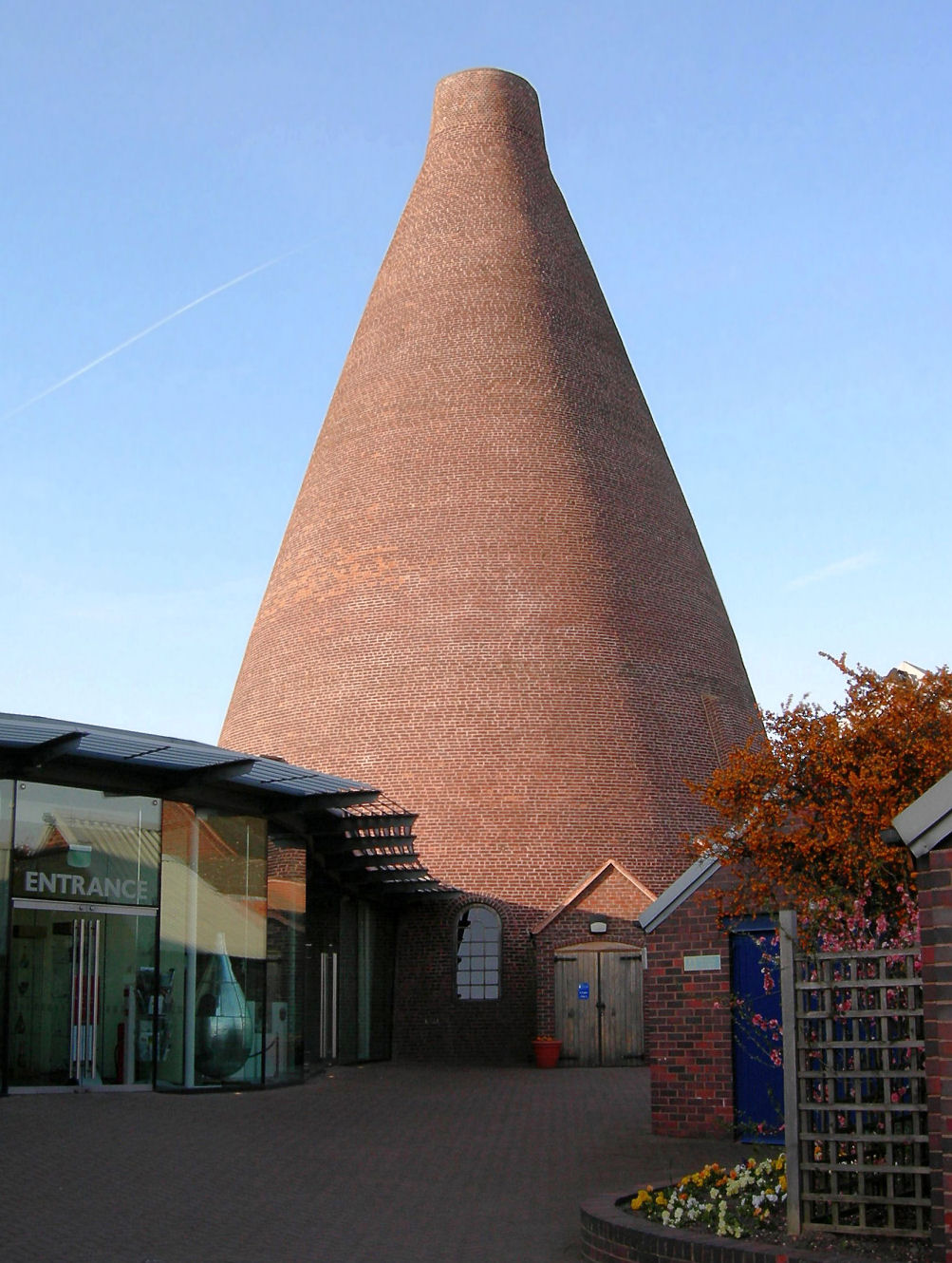
- Red House Glass Cone
- Interactive map of Red House Glass Cone
- Location: Wordsley, Stourbridge, West Midlands, England
- Designer: Richard Bradley and George Ensell
- Height: 90 feet (27 m)
- Completion date: 1794

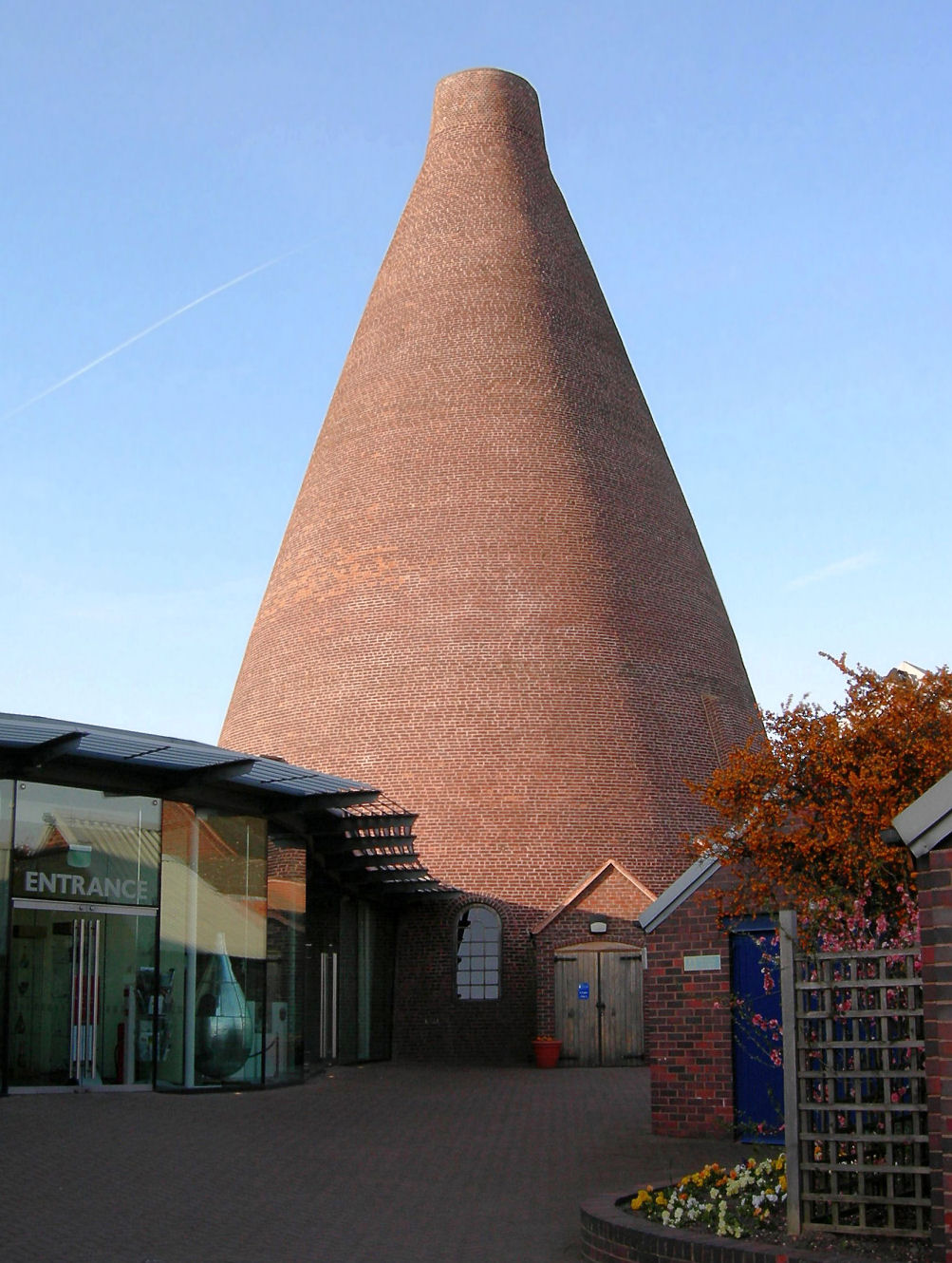
The Red House Glass Cone as seen from the gates

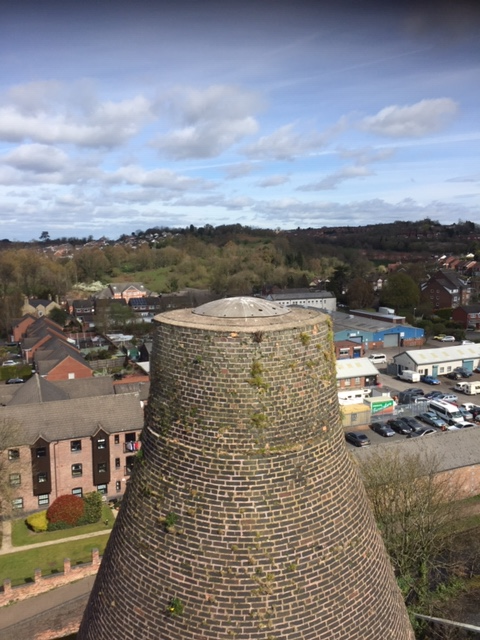
Top of the cone, seen in 2021

The Red House Glass Cone is a Grade II* listed glass cone located in Wordsley in the West Midlands, adjacent to the Stourbridge Canal bridge on the A491 High Street. It is a 90-foot (27 m) high conical brick structure with a diameter of 60 feet (18 m), used for the production of glass. It was used by the Stuart Crystal firm till 1936, when the company moved to a new facility at Vine Street. It is one of only four complete cones remaining in the United Kingdom.

It is one of four such structures in the UK and is currently maintained as a museum by Dudley Council. (The other three cones are at Lemington, Catcliffe and Alloa). At the site are 10 businesses including glass artists, pottery, jewellers, textiles fine art and demonstrations of glass blowing along with a Coffee House and gift shop.

A 1-acre (4,000 m^{2}) site, on which the cone stands, was sold by John and Ann Southwell and Rebecca Stokes to Richard Bradley, a wealthy glass-manufacturer, on 21 June 1788. The cone was built by Bradley in partnership with his brother-in-law, George Ensell, for the manufacture of window glass. Ensell installed a moving lehr in the cone, which remains today and is the only surviving one in the world.

The cone received Grade II* listed building status on 23 September 1966.

In April 2022, the Cone received a pledge of £1.5m from Dudley Council in order to restore the structure. The restored cone was opened to the public in August 2024.

== Representation in the media ==
The Red House Glass Cone was featured in an episode of BBC Two's Great British Railway Journeys, in the episode Sarah Cordingley taught Michael Portillo how to make a lampwork bead.
