= Glass cone =

Historical glass production facilities in the United Kingdom

A glass cone is a glass production structure historically unique to the United Kingdom. A glass cone had a large central furnace, a circular platform where the glassblowers worked, and smaller furnaces around its wall to ensure the glass did not cool too quickly.

There are five surviving glass cones:

- Catcliffe Glass Cone, South Yorkshire
- Lemington Glass Works, Newcastle upon Tyne
- Northern Glass Cone, Alloa Glass Works, a Scottish scheduled monument,
- Red House Cone in Wordsley, granted listed building status in 1966
- Pilkington's Jubilee Cone, St Helen's, restored in the 1990s and now part of the World of Glass

== See also ==
- Bottle oven, a bottle-shaped kiln typical of Stoke-on-Trent
