= Catcliffe Glass Cone =

Grade I listed building in the United Kingdom

Coordinates: 53.3926°N 1.3617°W

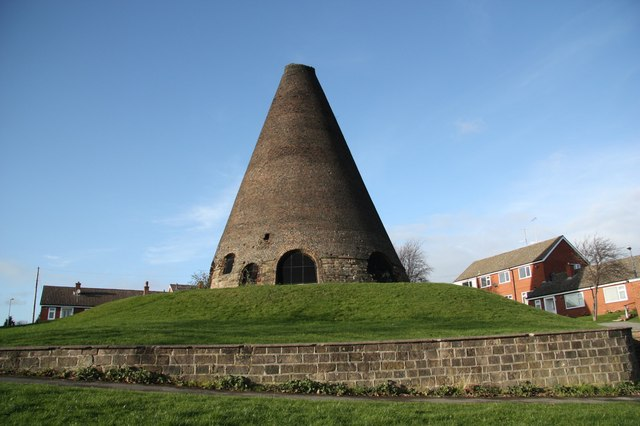
Catcliffe glassworks cone

The Catcliffe Glass Cone is a glass cone in the village of Catcliffe in South Yorkshire, England. It is the oldest surviving structure of its type in Western Europe, and it is a Grade I listed building and Scheduled Ancient Monument. Only three other glass cones survive in the United Kingdom; at Lemington, Wordsley and Alloa.

The glassworks cone was part of the Catcliffe glassworks, which was established in 1740 by William Fenney. Fenney had previously been the manager of the glassworks at Bolsterstone that was owned by his mother-in-law. The site at Catcliffe was chosen in part because the terms of her will prevented him from setting up a glassworks within 10 miles (16 km) of the works at Bolsterstone and Catcliffe is 10.5 miles (16.9 km) away. The glassworks closed c.1887, but was reopened briefly in 1900. The brick cone has archways around the base to allow maximum air entry. It is approximately 20 metres (66 ft) high.

Although glassmaking is an ancient process, it was carried out on a small scale until the development of industrialised methods in Europe allowed it to be mass-produced. The fusion of silica and sodium oxide in a furnace was usually achieved by the burning of wood; but coal was often used instead in Britain, which prompted the development of the glass cone. Glass cones consisted of a large central furnace, a flue to carry waste gas to the top of the structure and away, smaller furnaces around the walls to ensure the finished products stayed warm, and a circular platform on which workers stood while making their glassware. Although invented earlier, they became commonplace in the early 19th century; but further innovations in the glassmaking industry made the float glass production method more efficient and allowed manufacture to be based in fewer but larger works. Most cones were knocked down after they fell out of use, and by the mid-1970s only four survived: the Alloa cone (the only example in Scotland), Catcliffe Glass Cone, Lemington Glass Cone in Tyne and Wear, and Red House Cone in Wordsley, West Midlands.

In the First World War the site was used as a prisoner-of-war camp and, as a canteen during the 1926 United Kingdom general strike. The cone was threatened with demolition in the 1960s so the foundations of the other buildings that comprised the glassworks were excavated in 1962. In 1968 the cone received Grade I listing.

Access to the site was closed in 2006 as bricks were falling from the top of the structure. Restoration work was undertaken in 2014.

== See also ==
- Grade I listed buildings in South Yorkshire
- Listed buildings in Catcliffe
