= List of tourist attractions in Sheffield =

As a large city, Sheffield, South Yorkshire, England, has many tourist attractions from performing arts centres to museums, shopping centres and public parks. Below is a list of some of the more famous and visited:

Key
	Abbey/Priory/Cathedral
Accessible open space	Accessible open space
	Amusement/Theme Park
	Castle
Country Park	Country Park
	English Heritage
	Forestry Commission
Heritage railway	Heritage railway
Historic house	Historic House
Places of Worship	Places of Worship
Museum (free) Museum	Museum (free/not free)
National Trust	National Trust
	Theatre
	Zoo

- Abbeydale Industrial Hamlet
- Arts Tower
- Beauchief Abbey
- Birley Spa
- Bishops' House
- Crucible Theatre
- Cutlers' Hall
- Devonshire Green
- Don Valley Stadium
- The Dore Stone
- Endcliffe Park
- Graves Art Gallery
- Graves Park
- IceSheffield
- Kelham Island Museum
- Lyceum Theatre
- Magna Science Adventure Centre
- Meadowhall Shopping Centre
- Millennium Galleries
- Millhouses Park
- Old Queen's Head
- Peace Gardens
- Ponds Forge
- Rivelin Valley
- Rother Valley Country Park
- Sheaf Square
- Sheffield Arena
- Sheffield Botanical Gardens
- Sheffield Cathedral
- Sheffield City Hall
- Sheffield Fire and Police Museum
- Sheffield Manor
- Sheffield Town Hall
- Sheffield Walk of Fame
- Sheffield Winter Gardens
- Shepherd Wheel
- Showroom Cinema
- Site Gallery
- Valley Centertainment
- Victoria Quays
- Weston Park Museum
- Wheel of Sheffield
- Wincobank (hill fort)
- Yorkshire ArtSpace
