= Ecclesall =

Electoral ward in the City of Sheffield, South Yorkshire, England

Coordinates: 53°21′43″N 1°29′53″W

- Shown within Sheffield

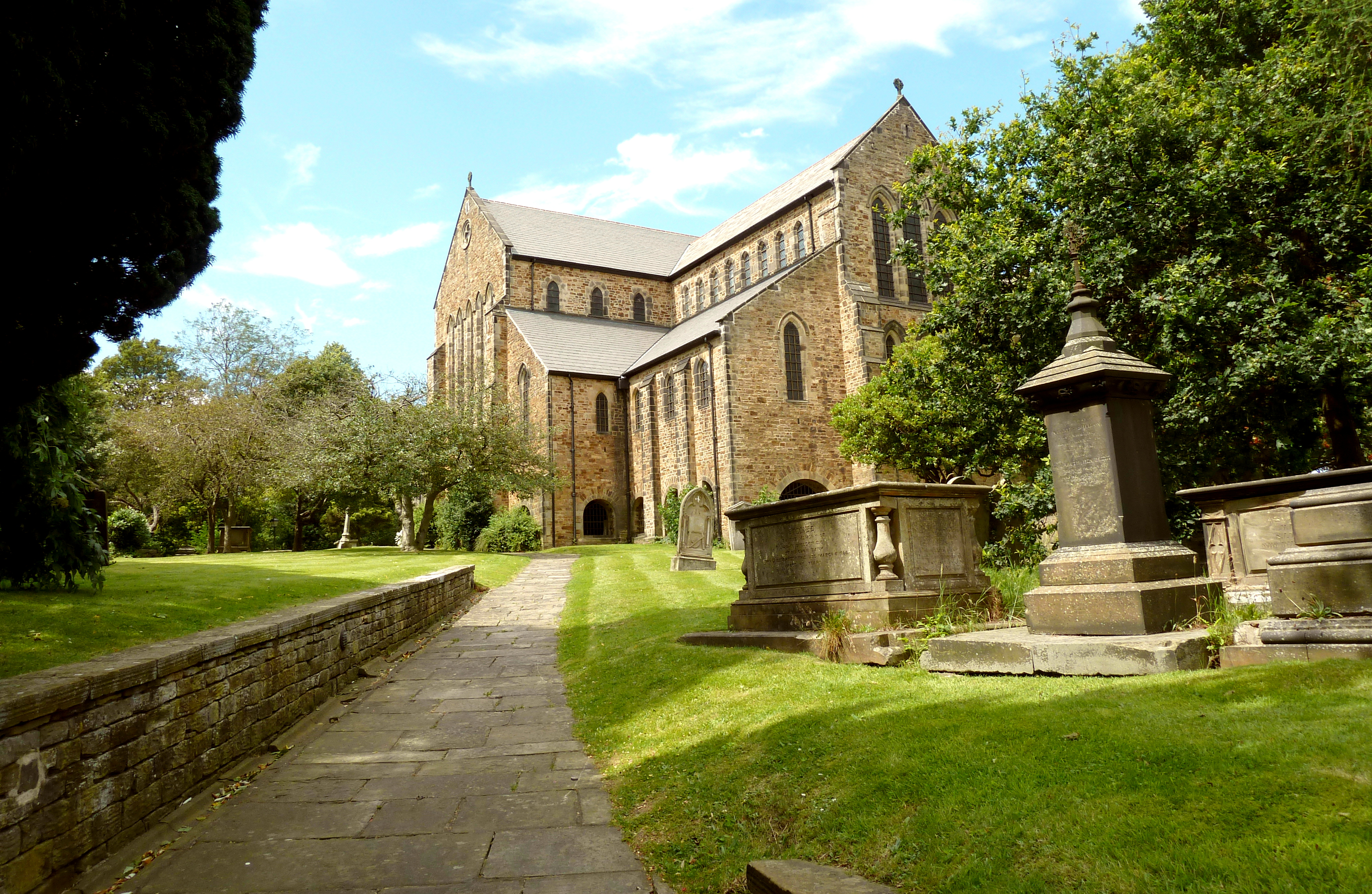
- All Saints Church

- Location within South Yorkshire
- Area: 3.6 sq mi (9.3 km^{2})
- Population: 19,211 (2007 est.)
  - Density: 5,336/sq mi (2,060/km^{2})
- Metropolitan borough: Sheffield
- Metropolitan county: South Yorkshire
- Region: Yorkshire and the Humber
- Country: England
- Sovereign state: United Kingdom
- UK Parliament: Sheffield Hallam
- Councillors: Peter Gilbert (Green Party); Barbara Masters (Liberal Democrats); Shaffaq Mohammed, Baron Mohammed of Tinsley (Liberal Democrats)

Ecclesall Ward—which includes the neighbourhoods of Banner Cross, Bents Green, Carterknowle, Ecclesall, Greystones, Millhouses, and Ringinglow—is one of the 28 electoral wards in the Sheffield district, in the county of South Yorkshire, England. It is located in the southwestern part of the city and covers an area of 3.6 square miles (2,300 acres; 9.3 km^{2}). The population of this ward in 2007 was 19,211 people in 7,626 households, reducing to 6,657 at the 2011 Census. Ecclesall ward is one of the four wards that make up the South West Community Assembly and one of five wards that make up the Sheffield Hallam Parliamentary constituency. The Member of Parliament is Olivia Blake, a Labour MP. Ecclesall is one of the least socially deprived wards in the entire country, with a 2002 deprivation score of 4.7—making it the 8,105th most deprived (hence 309th least deprived) ward out of 8,414 wards in the country. The demographic consists largely of white, middle-class families.

== History ==
Evidence of early occupation of the area can be found in Ecclesall Woods. A cup and ring-marked stone was discovered in 1981, and has been dated to the late Neolithic or Bronze Age periods. It, and the area a 2-metre (6 ft 7 in) diameter around it, is a scheduled ancient monument.

Ecclesall electoral ward was created 1934 when the old Ecclesall Bierlow ward was divided into Ecclesall, Broomhill and Hallam.

The boundaries of the ward include about half of the area that was historically known as Ecclesall Bierlow—one of the six 'townships' that made up the old Parish of Sheffield. Ecclesall Bierlow encompassed most of the land between the River Sheaf and the Porter Brook from The Moor to Ringinglow. It also included the areas of Broomhall and Crookesmoor to the north of the Porter Brook. Though this area contained numerous small villages and hamlets, there was never a village called Ecclesall. The parish of Ecclesall was formed on 1 April 1904 from "Ecclesall Bierlow", on 1 April 1933 the parish was abolished and merged with Sheffield. In 1931 the parish had a population of 203,892. It is now in the unparished area of Sheffield.

In ancient times this area was part of the Barnsdale Forest that, together with Sherwood Forest, made up the forest of the Robin Hood legends. The River Sheaf was thought for a time to be a "boundary" between the kingdoms of Northumbria and Mercia to the south. There is no historical proof of such a boundary as Northumbria stretched deep within Lindsey and modern Nottinghamshire and Derbyshire at different stages between the 6th and 11th century. What is thought to be the earliest historical record of this area refers to a defeat of the native Northumbrian army to an invasion force from the Kingdom of Wessex, which some historians have speculated may have taken place in the area around nearby Dore in 829.

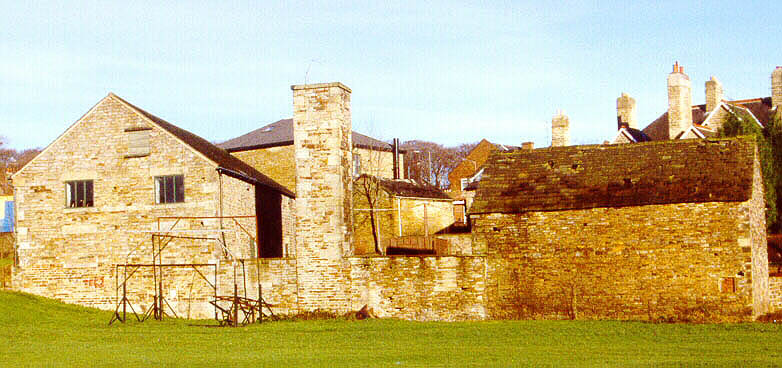
Ecclesall Corn Mill at Millhouses.

The name Ecclesall (either from Heeksel-Hallr meaning the witches' hill, or Eccles (church) halh (hollow)) is not mentioned in the Domesday Book of 1086—at that time Ecclesall was a part of the manor of Hallam. The name Ecclesall/Eccleshall is thought to be of Anglo-Scandinavian origin. The name is first found about 150 years later in the name of Sir Ralphus De Ecclesall a Norman feudal overlord who had taken over lands in the area from native Northumbrian landlords after the Norman invasion. The De Ecclesall family gave land to Norman and French monks who had come to Britain after the invasion. At Beauchief they established a corn mill on the river Sheaf, which was part of Beauchief Abbey. Many of the buildings of Ecclesall corn mill can still be seen at the northern end of Millhouses park—the district of Millhouses taking its name from this mill. In payment for the mill the monks of Beauchief were to provide a canon to say prayers daily at the Ecclesall chapel. These services continued at the chapel until the Dissolution of the Monasteries when Beauchief Abbey was abandoned. The chapel was restored in 1622 but was demolished when the present church was built nearby in 1788.

Until the 19th century Ecclesall Bierlow was very sparsely populated—in 1801 there were just 5362 people. This changed with the coming of the industrial revolution and the subsequent expansion of nearby Sheffield and by 1831 the population had increased to 14,239. In 1837 the Ecclesall Bierlow Poor Law Union came into being. As well as Ecclesall Bierlow, this encompassed Nether Hallam, Upper Hallam, Beauchief, Dore, Norton, and Totley. A workhouse was built near Ecclesall at Cherry Tree Hill, an area now part of the suburb of Nether Edge that was built up in the latter half of the 19th century. In 1929 the Ecclesall Bierlow Union Workhouse closed for good and became the Nether Edge Hospital, it remained in use as a hospital into the 1990s. Part of the old Workhouse the administration buildings that were across Union Road separate from the main Union Workhouse building became Nether Edge Grammar School, later renamed Brincliffe Grammar School in the late 1950s.

Historic sites within the ward include Abbeydale Industrial Hamlet and Shepherd Wheel (both now museums). Ecclesall Wood has many examples of white coal kilns and the grave of a wood collier who was killed here when his cabin burned down on 11 October 1786.

== Neighbourhoods ==
=== Banner Cross ===
Banner Cross is a district of Sheffield centred on the intersection of Ecclesall Road and Psalter Lane. This district is split evenly between Nether Edge/Sharrow and Ecclesall Wards. Banner Cross Hall, an ancient esquire seat, was virtually rebuilt in 1820. The main place of worship is Banner Cross Methodist Church. The nearby Banner Cross pub gained infamy when the notorious criminal Charles Peace shot and killed Arthur Dyson in the passageway beside the pub on 29 November 1876. The base of an old stone cross still remained at Banner Cross in 1819. Addy (1888) suggested that the name derives from bæna kross, meaning the cross of prayers.

=== Carter Knowle ===
Carter Knowle or Carterknowle (grid reference SK335843) lies south of Brincliffe Edge, between Ecclesall Road and Abbeydale. A residential area, which includes what was originally known as Knab Farm Estate. Housing was built on former farmland there, in the valley between Brincliffe Edge and the upper part of Carter Knowle Road during the late 1950s / early 1960s by local building firm Gleesons. The area was home to Sheffield College's Bannerdale campus, but after its closure and demolition, a new educational academy, the Mercia School was opened on the site adjacent to Carter Knowle Road in September 2018.

=== Ecclesall ===
The district of Ecclesall (grid reference SK323844) is centred roughly on Ecclesall parish church at the intersection of Carter Knowle Road and Ecclesall Road. The present church, dedicated to All Saints, was built in 1788, consecrated in 1789 and has been altered several times since. Banner Cross Hall, also in the area, was built in 1820.

=== Greystones ===
Greystones (grid reference SK322851) lies to the north of the district of Ecclesall. It is on a headland overlooking the Porter valley to the north and west.

=== Millhouses ===
Millhouses (grid reference SK330833) lies to the south of the district of Ecclesall. Its origins lie in a small hamlet that grew around the Ecclesall Corn Mill.

=== Bents Green ===
Bents Green (grid reference SK316843) lies to the west of the district of Ecclesall

=== Ringinglow ===
Ringinglow (grid reference SK290837) is a village on the western border of Ecclesall Ward. Although it is within the boundary of the City of Sheffield, it is self-contained, entirely surrounded by open countryside. It is focussed on the intersections of Fulwood Lane and Houndkirk Road with Ringinglow Road.

== Transport ==
Ecclesall Road is the main road (A625) from central Sheffield to the south-west, at first following the Porter Brook, then running through Ecclesall and Dore. The road is a major shopping area. Attractions including the Sheffield Botanical Gardens and the Sheffield General Cemetery lie alongside it, as does one of the campuses of Sheffield Hallam University. Abbeydale Road South (A621) is another major road that runs through the ward. The Midland Main Line railway line runs along the southern boundary of the ward, though the closest stations are outside of the ward at Sheffield and Dore & Totley. The former Millhouses & Ecclesall station was closed on 10 June 1968. The Sheffield Supertram currently has no routes through Ecclesall ward, but a planned extension to Dore would skirt the southern boundary.

== Parks and recreation ==
About half of Ecclesall ward is made up of rural areas, parkland, or woodland. These areas include a large portion of the 350-acre (140 ha) Ecclesall Woods, an area of ancient woodland that is known locally for being a bluebell wood. In the north section of the ward is Bingham Park, Whiteley Woods and part of the Porter valley; Millhouses Park marks the ward's southern boundary. The ward also includes some of Whirlow Brook Park and the Limb Valley. The Sheffield Round Walk skirts the ward, running through a number of these parks.

== Education ==
There are two secondary schools within Ecclesall ward, High Storrs School and Silverdale School. The ward also includes Ecclesall Primary School (formerly Ecclesall Infants) and Clifford All Saints C Of E Primary School (formerly Ecclesall Junior School), Dobcroft Junior School, Greystones Primary School, Mylnhurst Convent School, and St Wilfrid's Primary School.

== Bibliography ==
- Harvey, Peter (1996). Abbeydale and Millhouses. Stround: The Charlford Publishing Company Limited. ISBN 0-7524-0732-5
- Hunter, Joseph (1819). The Township of Ecclesall Byerlow. In Hallamshire. The History and Topography of the Parish of Sheffield in the County of York, pp195–219. London: Lackington, Hughes, Harding, Mayor & Jones.
- Vickers, J. Edward MBE (1999). Ecclesall. In Old Sheffield Town. An Historical Miscellany (2nd ed.), pp58–64. Sheffield: The Hallamshire Press Limited. ISBN 1-874718-44-X.
- "Ecclesall Bierlow Workhouse and Poor Law Union". History of the Workhouse. Archived from the original on 19 April 2005.
- "Ecclesall/Ecclesall Bierlow?". Sheffield Genealogy Family & Social History. Archived from the original on 7 February 2005.
- "Water Wheels on the River Sheaf in Abbeydale". The Tilt Hammer. Archived from the original on 14 February 2005.
