= Bingham Park =

Park and woods in South Yorkshire, England

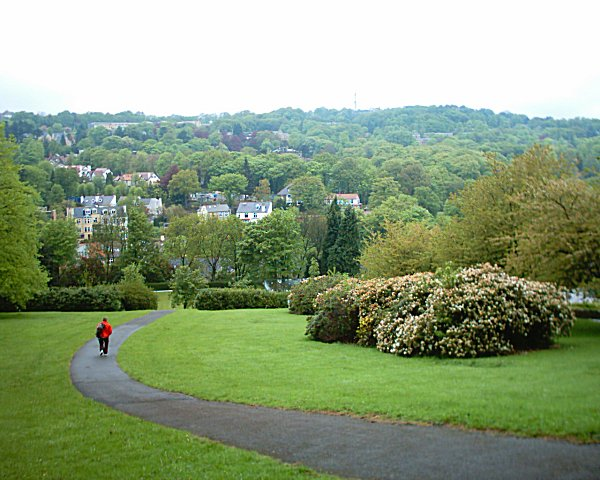
- View of Ranmoor from Bingham Park

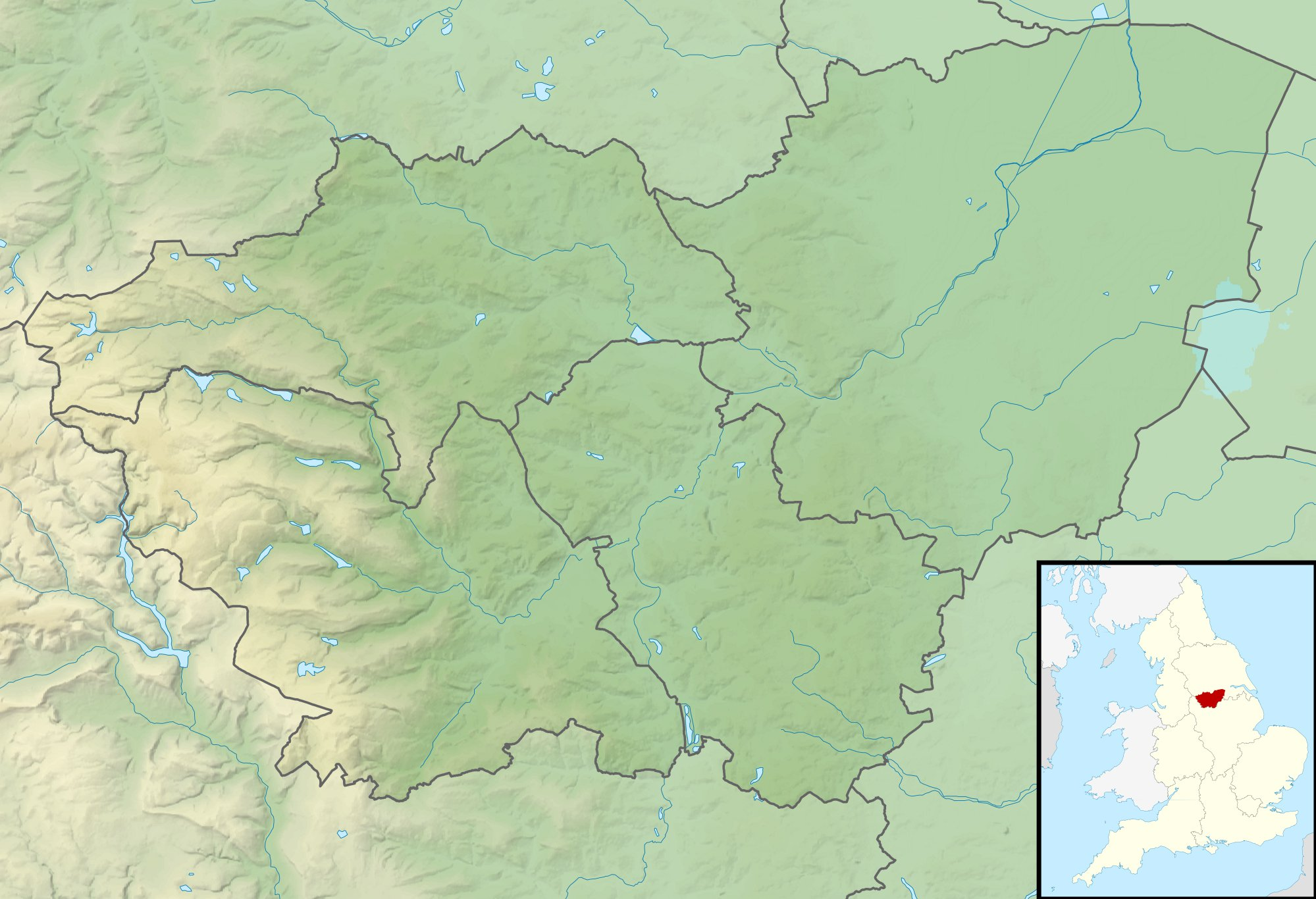
- Location within South Yorkshire
- Interactive map of Bingham Park
- Location: Ecclesall and Ranmoor, City of Sheffield, South Yorkshire, England
- Coordinates: 53°21′56″N 1°31′14″W

Bingham Park is one of the chain of Porter Valley Parks in Sheffield, South Yorkshire, England.

== Location ==
Bingham Park is a park near Ecclesall and Ranmoor, Sheffield. It is the second (when travelling west from the city centre) of a line of parks and public open spaces along the Porter Brook, known as the Porter Valley Parks. To the north-east it is separated from the first in the chain, Endcliffe Park, by Rustlings Road, and to the west from Whiteley Woods by Highcliffe Road. National Cycle Route 6 passes through the park, utilising the Peak Park Anniversary cycle route.

== Description ==
Bingham Park is a grassy area high on a hillside with views across the valley, to Ranmoor. A footpath, leaving Rustlings Road serpents the valley bottom towards Whiteley Woods. The footpath ends at Forge Dam Park, passing several dams of the Porter Brook, including Shepherd Wheel. The park possesses tennis courts, a mini golf course and a bowling green, an astroturf and has much woodland. The AstroTurf is commonly used by local footballers.

== History ==
The first 11 acres (4.5 ha) of land which now forms Bingham Park was presented to Sheffield Corporation on 11 September 1911 by Sir John E. Bingham. In 1927 the land around an early water-powered scythe works and its dam were incorporated into the park.
