= Forge Dam Park =

Park in Sheffield, South Yorkshire, England

Coordinates: 53.361°N 1.542°W

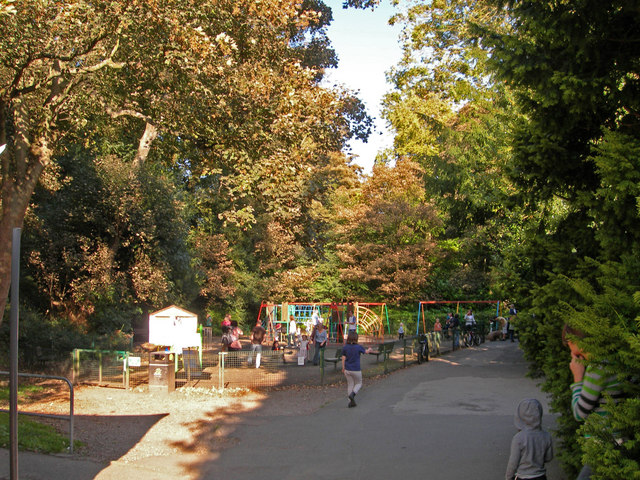
Playground in Forge Dam Park

Forge Dam Park is a park in Fulwood, in the city of Sheffield, South Yorkshire, England. Forge Dam Park is the fourth of the Grade II listed Porter Valley Parks, a connected series of parks (when travelling west from Sheffield city centre) along the course of the Porter Brook. The 49 acres (20 ha) park is on the site of the Old Mayhouse Farm and Forge Dam. It was acquired by the J G Graves Charitable Trust in 1938.

== History ==
In the 1700s, Sheffield's industry was focused on the manufacture of cutlery. To aid this, the Porter Brook was dammed diverting the water to a series of grinding mills. As the town expanded through the 19th century, the Porter valley was used for walks.

Sheffield Corporation (later Sheffield City Council), purchased 20 acres (8.1 ha) of land in the area in 1885 with the intention of building pleasure grounds as well as to improve local sanitation by building a new sewer. The new park was designed by William Goldring, who included features to improve the aesthetics of the walks, such as gravel paths, flower beds and stepping stones.

The series of parks and walks carried on expanding, and in 1938, the J. G. Graves Charitable Trust purchased 49 acres (20 ha), and created the Forge Dam Park. A walk known as the Sheffield Round Walk, which circled Endcliffe Park, Bingham Park, Whiteley Woods, Forge Dam Park and Porter Clough, was completed around 1945.

== Park ==
In 1913, when the pleasure grounds were sold, they advertised "boating, fishing, bowling green, swings, tearooms, and motor boats"

Today, the park is laid out a roughly rectangular space occupying approximately 23.5 acres (9.5 ha). It is located between Quiet Lane, Whiteley Lane, Ivy Cottage Lane and fields to the south. The main entrance is located on Ivy Cottage Lane, with some informal parking along the road.

In 1924 Patrick Abercrombie said of the parks, "The Porter Brook Parkway, consisting as it does of a string of contiguous open spaces, is the finest example to be found in this country of a radial park strip, an elongated open space, leading from a built-up part of the city direct into the country, the land occupied being a river valley and so for the greater part unsuitable for building."
