= Jane Gosling =

Jane Gosling (died 1804) was an English writer and schoolteacher of the 18th century.

== Biography ==
Relatively little is known of Jane Gosling. She was married in 1769 to Ralph Gosling, a great-nephew of Ralph Gosling (1693–1758; published the first map of Sheffield), and she ran a school in Sheffield, attended by a four-year-old Joseph Hunter, a historian who mentioned her in a later publication. She wrote and had published on her own account two volumes: Ashdale Village (1794) and Moral Essays and Reflections (1789).

The British Critic: And Quarterly Theological Review, Volume 4 commented on Moral Essays and Reflections: "It is an unfinished tale, but as far as it goes does credit to the sensibilities and agreeable talents of the author. We see no reason why it should not be completed. It will amuse many and will offend none." The British Library holds copies of the two volumes of Ashdale Village in decorative bindings.

She is mentioned in Robert Eadon Leader's Sheffield in the Eighteenth Century, in a section on education: "Mrs. Jane Gosling, who published a not ill-written volume of highly correct 'Moral Essays,' besides issuing a tale entitled "Ashdale Village," had a school where the inculcation of lofty precepts was, we may imagine, accompanied by decent teaching...", but also in a section on Sheffield writers: "and Mrs. Jane Gosling was propounding most unimpeachable but by no means recondite or startlingly original ethical maxims on the duties of early piety, of patience, of children, of parents, of beneficence, of female discretion, of female modesty, and of conjugal affection; and was, with immaculate orthodoxy, condemning the vices of swearing, gaming, lying, pride, and the keeping of evil company."
