= Porter Valley Parks =

Chain of public parks in Sheffield, England

Coordinates: 53.359°N 1.546°W

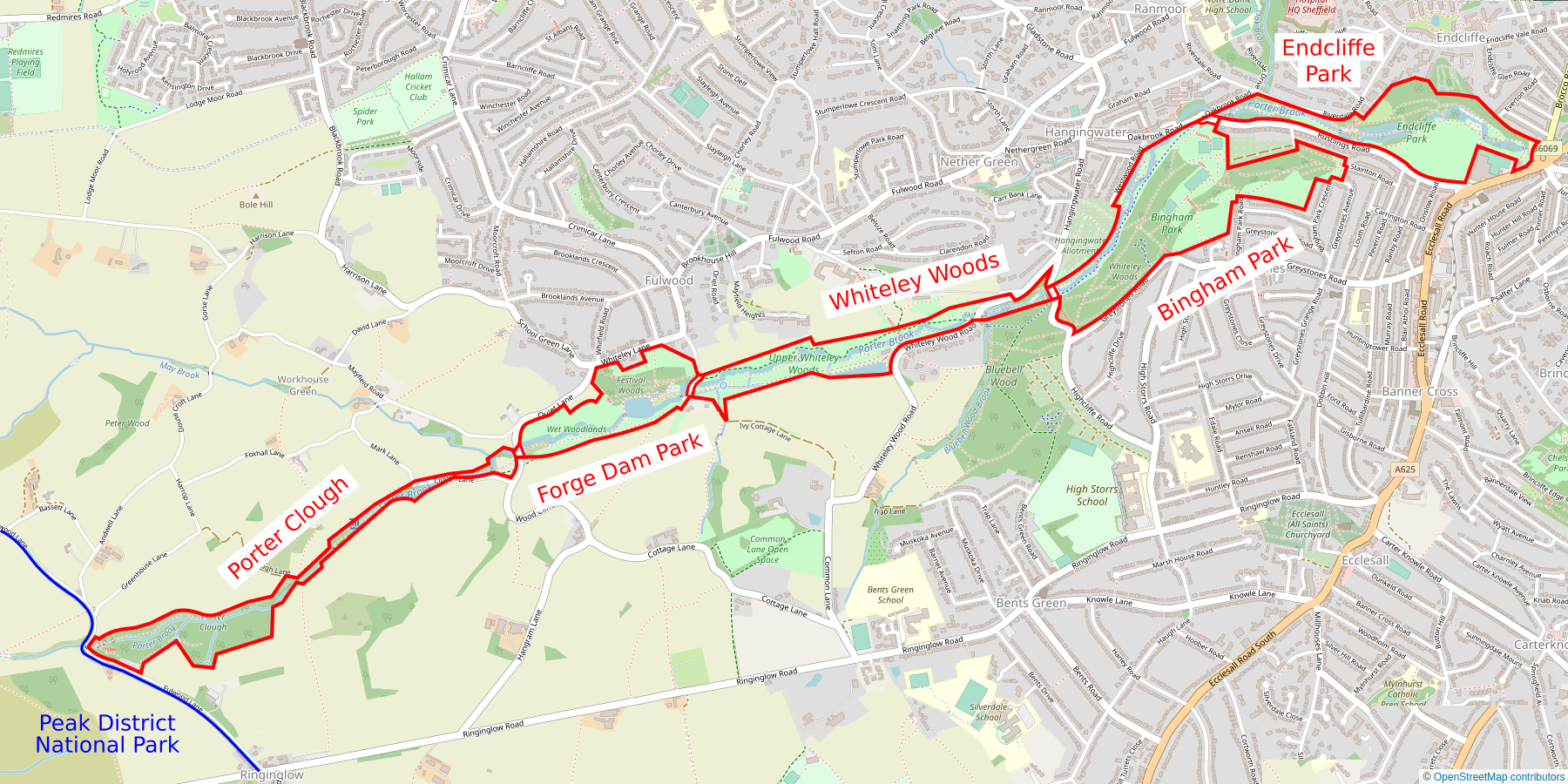
The five Porter Valley Parks

The Porter Valley Parks are a series of public parks and green spaces in Sheffield, England. Lying along the valley of Porter Brook, they run radially out from the city centre, providing a direct green-space connection to the Peak District national park. Created variously between 1855 and 1938, they comprise in order from the city centre; Endcliffe Park, Bingham Park, Whiteley Woods, Forge Dam Park and Porter Clough.

The parks are listed at Grade II on the Register of Historic Parks and Gardens. The Friends of the Porter Valley is a registered charity which supports their maintenance and improvement.

National Cycle Route 6 passes through parts of Bingham Park, Whiteley Woods and Porter Clough.

== Parks ==
In 1924 Patrick Abercrombie said of the parks, "The Porter Brook Parkway, consisting as it does of a string of contiguous open spaces, is the finest example to be found in this country of a radial park strip, an elongated open space, leading from a built-up part of the city direct into the country, the land occupied being a river valley and so for the greater part unsuitable for building."

Besides green spaces, the parks contain various recreational facilities and historic monuments.

The Porter Valley Parks are included as a part of the Sheffield Round Walk.

=== Endcliffe Park ===
Endcliffe Park comprises 38 acres (15.5 ha) and is adjacent to Sheffield city centre. It was opened in 1887 to commemorate the Jubilee of Queen Victoria.

The park is home to three monuments dedicated to Queen Victoria, as well as the "Mi Amigo" memorial and ten American Oak trees, marking the crash site of a USAAF B-17 Flying Fortress.

=== Bingham Park ===
Bingham Park is the largest in the chain at 61 acres (24.5 ha), and is separated from Endcliffe Park by Rustlings Road. It was originally donated to the people of Sheffield in 1911, by industrialist Sir John E. Bingham, and was later expanded. Situated up a hillside, it offers good views out over the valley.

=== Whiteley Woods ===
Whiteley Woods is adjacent to Bingham Park and covers 28 acres (11.5 ha).

The woodland and an existing dam and goit were also acquired in stages. In 1897/98 T Walter Hall presented land to Sheffield Corporation. A further grant of land was made in 1913 by Sheffield Town Trustees and in 1932 the J G Graves Charitable Trust donated land to the corporation.

The Shepherd Wheel is a working water wheel and museum, located on the Porter Brook where it runs through Whiteley Woods.

White Watson, geologist, was born in Whiteley Woods in the 1760s.

=== Forge Dam ===
Forge Dam Park was originally created in 1938 and covered 49 acres (20 ha), but today occupies only 23 acres (9.5 ha). The dam was originally built to supply water for the manufacture of cutlery.

=== Porter Clough ===
At 18 acres (7.2 ha), Porter Clough is the smallest of the five parks. Long but narrow, and for the most part with steep wooded sides up the valley, its south-western end extends 4.3 miles (7 km) from the city centre, to join up with the Peak District.

== Porter Valley Woodlands ==
The Porter Valley Woodlands is a designated local nature reserve (LNR), sited partly within the Porter Valley Parks. It comprises the wooded areas of the parks, together with the adjacent Bluebell Wood.
