= William Goldring =

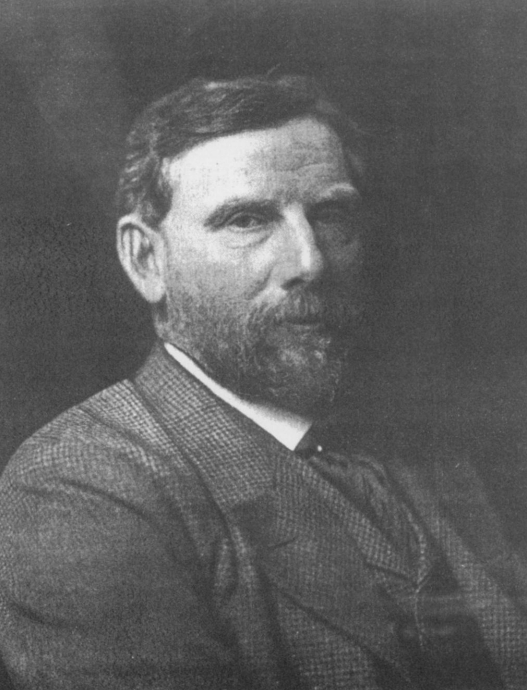
Goldring c. 1913

William Goldring (May 1854 – 26 February 1919) was a landscape architect, and naturalist. Goldring arrived in Royal Botanic Gardens, Kew (1875) where he was in charge of the Herbaceous Department at the world-famous botanical garden. He served as the Assistant Editor of The Garden (1879), and the Editor of Woods and Forests (1883-1886). He was also President of the Kew Guild, The Royal Botanic Gardens, Kew, London, England (1913). Goldring's work included many private houses, hospitals, asylums and public parks in England, Wales, India, and the United States of America. He is responsible for work on nearly 700 different garden landscape projects in England alone.

Goldring was born at West Dean, near Chichester. He died near Kew after suffering from asthma and bronchial problems.

== Notable projects ==
=== United Kingdom ===
- Cobham Hall, Maidstone, Kent
- Borough Gardens, Dorchester, Dorset
- Godinton House, Kent
- Hatfield House, Hertfordshire
- Napsbury Hospital, St Albans, Hertfordshire
- Phoenix Park, Dublin
- Endcliffe Park, Bingham Park, Whiteley Woods, Sheffield, S. Yorkshire

A linked sequence of public parks, gardens, and green spaces created along the valley of Porter Brook between 1855 and 1938 following a devastating moorland conflagration. Great fires occurred during the summer of 1868 setting the woods ablaze. Goldring's re-creation comprised Endcliffe Park 38.3 acres (15.5 hectares), Bingham Park 60.54 acres (24.50 hectares), Whiteley Woods 28.42 acres (11.50 hectares), Forge Dam 23.48 acres (9.50 hectares), and Porter Clough 17.8 acres (7.2 hectares). Porter Brook are all part of the Sheffield Round Walk, completed shortly after World War II.
Endcliffe Park was laid out by Goldring in 1885 when Endcliffe Wood was purchased by City of Sheffield. Many features in naturally occurring Millstone Grit, such as stepping-stones across Porter Brook, were incorporated and in 1887 a Jubilee Monument was erected commemorating the Golden Jubilee of Victoria of the United Kingdom. In 1891 he added a tennis pavilion and lodge in the fashionable Art Nouveau style located at the park entrance, Hunter's Bar. Further extensions to Endcliffe Park were made in 1888 and 1929.

- Welbeck Abbey, Clumber Park, Nottinghamshire

=== other ===
- Chateau de Laversine, near Chantilly, France.
- Laxmi Vilas Palace, Vadodara, India.

The Laxmi Vilas Palace, an extravagant building of the Indo-Saracenic school, was designed by architect, Major Charles Mant and built by the Maharaja of Baroda Maharaja Sayajirao Gaekwad III (1863-1939) in 1890 at a cost of £180,000. It is reputed to have been the largest private dwelling built in the nineteenth century and four times the size of Buckingham Palace. The interior is reminiscent of a large European country house and the Palace "compound" of over 700 acres (280 hectares) was landscaped by William Goldring.

- Missouri Botanical Garden, St. Louis, USA.
