= Ralph Gosling =

English topographer

- Born: 1693
- Died: 1758 (aged 64–65)
- Occupation: Topographer

Ralph Gosling (1693–1758) was an English topographer.

== Biography ==
Gosling was the youngest son of Charles Gosling, yeoman, of Stubley, in the parish of Dronfield in Derbyshire. He was baptised in the parish church on 15 July 1693. He was probably educated at the Elizabethan grammar school of Dronfield, but appears to have married at a comparatively early age, and to have settled at Sheffield, where he found employment as a writing-master, a schoolmaster, and perhaps also as a surveyor. In the baptismal register of his son John, 7 September 1720, he is described as a writing-master; in the register of John's burial, 26 December 1720, he is described as a schoolmaster; and in his will (proved 7 March 1758), in which he is still described as a schoolmaster, he mentions his surveying instruments.

In 1732 he published the earliest known map of Sheffield, which is referred to in Hunter's ‘Hallamshire’ (Gatty's edit. p. 18), where he is also said to have made some collections for the history of Sheffield. Of these no trace remains, and the map, of which another edition appears to have been published in 1736 (Gatty, Sheffield Past and Present, p. 121), is very scarce. There is no copy of either edition in the British Museum. At his death in 1758 he seems to have been in comfortable circumstances, a schedule of money owing to him amounting to 1,205l. His wife Mary had died previously in February 1755. Besides a daughter, Mary, whose name has no place in his will, and who presumably died before him, he had a son and a daughter who both died in infancy. Joseph Hunte, the historian of Hallamshire, speaks of Jane Gosling, the wife of Gosling's grandson, who eked out her husband's narrow means by keeping a dame's school, which he himself attended when four years old (Add. MS. 24440, f. 33). It is, however, almost certain that Gosling had no other children than those mentioned above, and that the husband of Jane Gosling was his grand-nephew. Besides keeping the school, Jane was the author of ‘Moral Essays and Reflections’ (Sheffield, 1789), and of ‘Ashdale Village,’ a tale of which only the first two volumes were published. She died in 1804. Her name does not appear in the Catalogue of the British Museum.
