= Leader House =

Georgian townhouse in Sheffield, England

Coordinates: 53.379707°N 1.46677°W

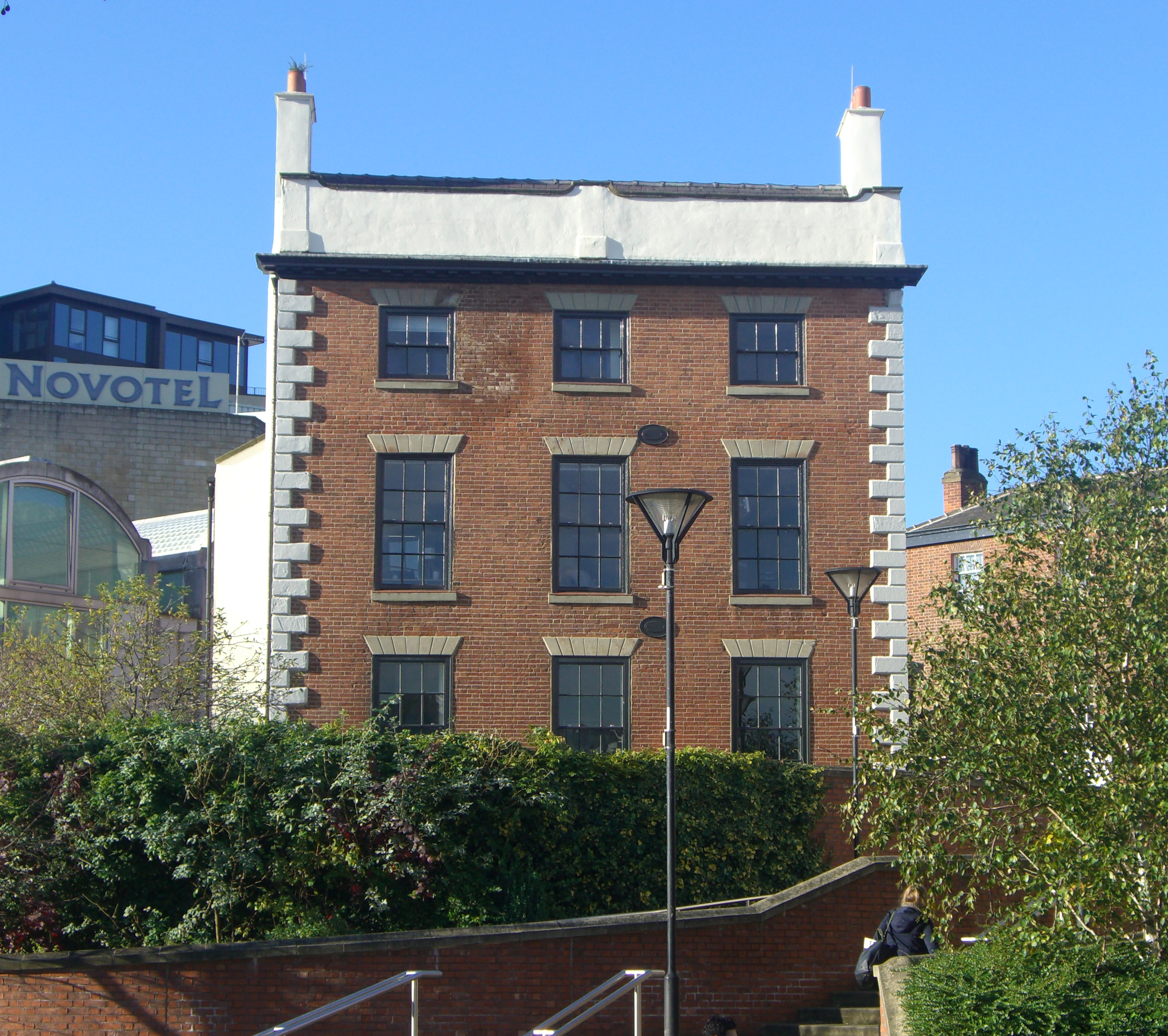
Seen from Arundel Gate

Leader House is a Georgian townhouse on Surrey Street in the city centre of Sheffield, England. It overlooks Arundel Gate and is a Grade II listed building.

== History ==
The house was built in 1770 by the Duke of Norfolk for his agent Vincent Eyre; however, there is no evidence that Mr Eyre actually lived in the house. In 1777, Thomas Leader leased the house; Leader was a silversmith, originally from Broxted in Essex, who came to Sheffield to set up the firm of Tudor, Leader & Co. in 1762 with Henry Tudor. The firm's speciality was high-quality snuff boxes. The house became known as Leader House at this time and has continued to be called so up to the present day. The Leaders emerged as one of the eminent families of Sheffield, becoming newspaper publishers and historians.

In 1780 there was a reorganisation of the street plan around the house, which resulted in the garden on the west side being spoilt. To compensate for this, the Leaders leased a garden plot on the opposite side of the house. In the late 1780s, the house was enlarged at the rear and a bay window was added on the north side. Thomas Leader retired in 1797 but his family continued to live there until 1817, with one of his sons, Daniel, living in the house for a time. In 1817, Leader House was sold to the Pearson family and between 1853 and 1873 Mr Pearson’s daughter lived there with her husband, the surgeon H. Brown Fisher. Charles Wardlow, owner of Wardlows Steel Company on Carlisle Street in Sheffield, bought the house in 1872 and later his son Marmaduke lived there, spending large amounts of money to renovate and improve the building.

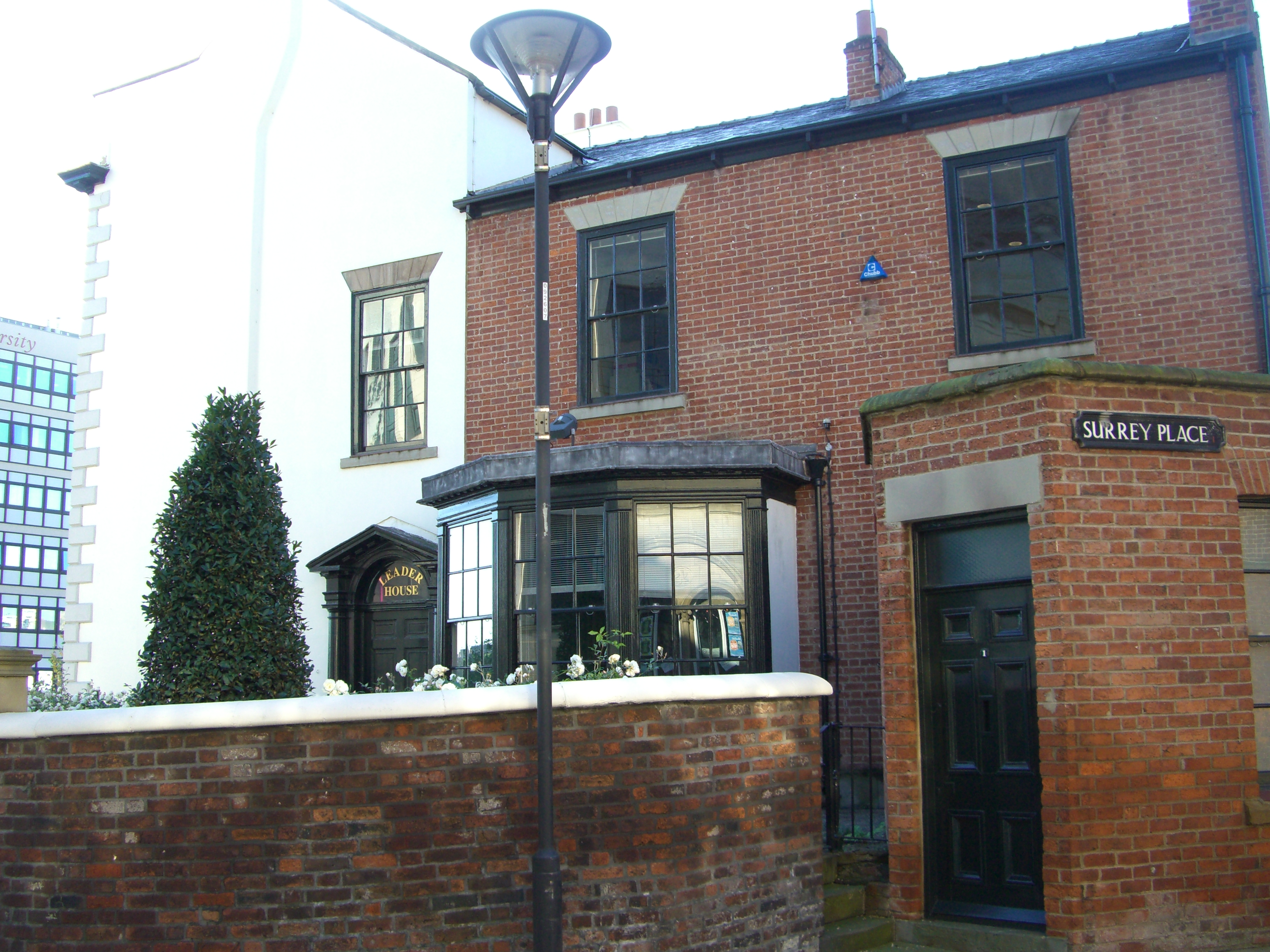
North side of the building showing the bay window and the Doric main entrance

The house was sold by the Wardlows in 1920 and had several occupants in the following years including the silversmith company Thomas Bradbury & Son (whose workshops were in nearby Arundel Street) and the accountants Joshua Worley & Sons (who later moved to Paradise Square). The house was purchased by Sheffield Corporation in May 1938 and was designated as a listed building in May 1952. On 20 March 1970 Sheffield Corporation applied to the Minister of Housing for Listed Building Consent to demolish Leader House so a modern circular register office could be built on the site. The project was strongly opposed by the allamshire Historical Building Society, which resulted in a public enquiry being held in September 1970. On 27 November 1970 the Minister gave the decision that Leader House should not be demolished. The circular register office known locally as the "Wedding Cake" was eventually constructed on a site 100 metres to the SW and was demolished in 2004.

From 1970 Leader House was leased out by the Council and became part of the Sheffield Polytechnic, which later became Sheffield Hallam University. In recent years the building has reverted to use by Sheffield City Council and is now the administration offices of Museums Sheffield. The late-1880s extension to the rear of Leader House is classed as a separate building with the address 2 Surrey Place; for many years it housed the Central Deaf Club, but is now used by The Source Skills Academy, a training and development organisation.

== Architecture ==
Leader House is brick built with a slate roof with one brick and two rendered gable stacks. On the north side is the main pedimented door with Doric columns and a large canted bay window. The house is three storied with a three window range at the front, these being twelve pane sashes on the first two floors and six pain sashes on the top storey.
