= Weston Park Museum =

Museum in Sheffield, South Yorkshire, England

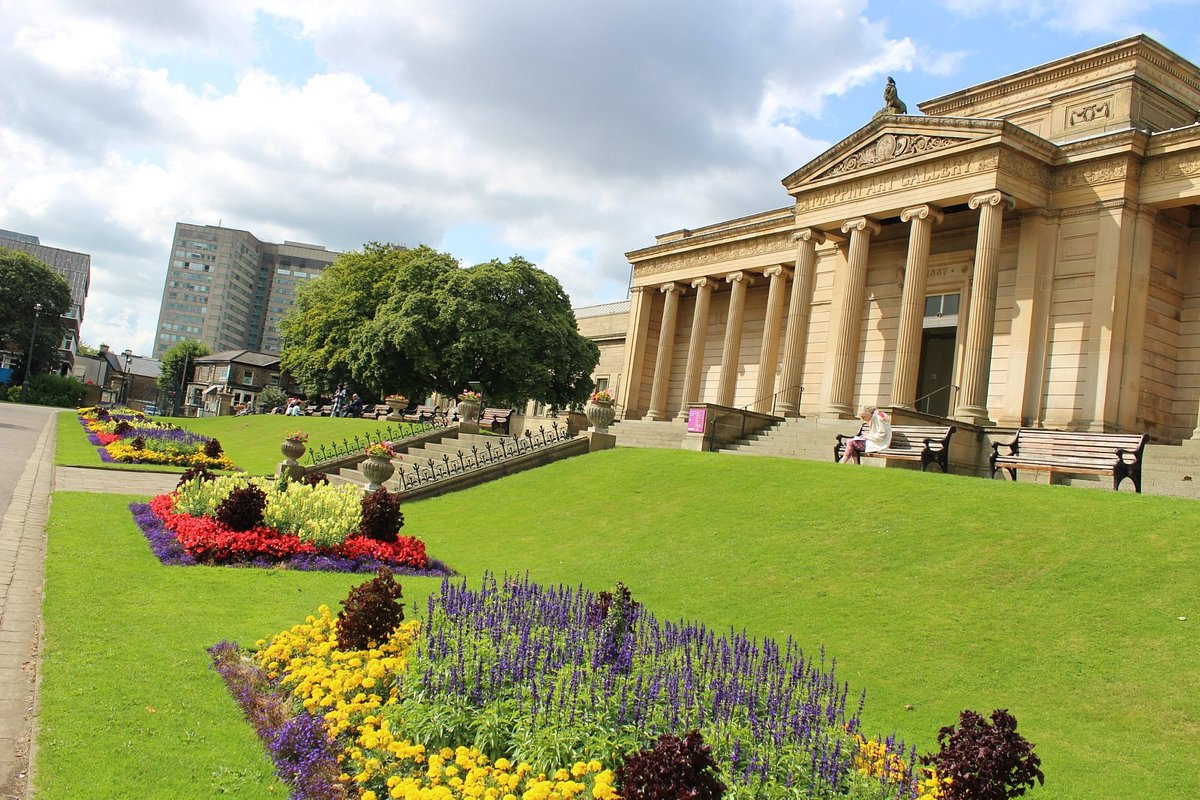
- View of Weston Park Museum

- Location within South Yorkshire
- Established: 1875; 151 years ago
- Location: Western Bank, Weston Park Museum, Mushroom Lane, Sheffield S10 2TP, England
- Coordinates: 53°22′54″N 1°29′32″W
- Public transit access: B Y University of Sheffield
- Website: www.sheffieldmuseums.org.uk/visit-us/weston-park-museum/

Weston Park Museum is a museum in Sheffield, South Yorkshire, England. It is one mile west of Sheffield city centre within Weston Park. It is Sheffield's largest museum and is housed in a Grade II* listed building and managed by Museums Sheffield. Until 2006 it was called Sheffield City Museum and Mappin Art Gallery.

== History ==
The museum opened in 1875 in Weston House, whose grounds later became the park. A neoclassical extension, in the Ionic order, was added in 1887. The Mappin Art Gallery was built to house the collection of work bequeathed to the city by the Rotherham businessman John Newton Mappin. Weston Hall was demolished in the 1930s and a purpose-built structure, adjoining the Mappin Art Gallery, and funded in part by donations from local businessman J. G. Graves, was completed in 1937.

For much of its history the complex was officially known as the Sheffield City Museum and Mappin Art Gallery. The museum contained Sheffield's archaeology, natural history, decorative art and social history collections. The Mappin Art Gallery held Mappin's own collection and temporary art exhibitions. In December 1940 the Mappin Art Gallery suffered a direct hit in the Sheffield Blitz, destroying a significant part of the building and damaging much of the rest. During the 1950s and 1960s the museum remained open to the public, whilst the Mappin Art Gallery was left in a partially demolished state after the structure had been made safe. The Mappin Art Gallery reopened in 1965. From 1965 to 2003 it hosted significant art exhibitions, such as the British Art Show, and celebrated its centenary in 1987.

The two buildings closed in March 2003 for complete renovation. The £17.3 million re-development was partly funded by the Heritage Lottery Fund, Sheffield City Council and Objective 1 for South Yorkshire. The building reopened in October 2006 as Weston Park Museum. This removed the separate identity of the Mappin Art Gallery. The museum closed again in summer 2016 for a refurbishment and to celebrate the tenth anniversary of the renovation.

The museum's archaeology exhibits include a replica of the Bronze Age rock art from Gardom's Edge and many items collected by Thomas Bateman, notably the Benty Grange helmet which closely matches the descriptions of warriors' helmets in Beowulf. There are seven galleries: the Royle Gallery; Sheffield Life and Times; Beneath Your Feet; Ancient Egypt; What On Earth!; Sheffield Stories; and Picturing Sheffield. The Royle Gallery houses temporary exhibitions celebrating Sheffield's stories, creative talents and the city's connections to the wider world.

The museum is home to one of the longest serving weather stations in the country, providing data on Sheffield's weather since 1882.

Weston Park museum receives around 250,000 visitors a year and was nominated for the prestigious Gulbenkian Prize in 2007. In 2008 the museum won The Guardian's Family Friendly Museums award.
