= Robert Eadon Leader =

British journalist and politician (1839–1922)

- Born: 2 January 1839
- Died: April 18, 1922 (aged 83)
- Education: New College London
- Occupations: journalist liberal activist historian
- Spouse: Emily Sarah Pye-Smith (m. 1864)
- Father: Robert Leader

Robert Eadon Leader (2 January 1839 – 18 April 1922) was a journalist, Liberal activist, and historian. He published many books on the history of the Sheffield area.

He was the son of Robert Leader, Alderman and Town Trustee, and proprietor of the Sheffield and Rotherham Independent newspaper. Educated at New College London he joined his elder brother, John Daniel Leader, and father at the Sheffield Independent. In 1864 he married his second cousin Emily Sarah Pye-Smith (both were great-grandchildren of John Pye-Smith).

He was one of the founders of the Sheffield Junior Liberal Association, and of the Sheffield Parliamentary Debating Society. He unsuccessfully ran for parliament twice. In 1892 he ran as the Liberal Party candidate for the Sheffield Ecclesall constituency, and in 1895 he ran in the Bassetlaw constituency. He served as president of the Hunter Archaeological Society and the Provincial Newspaper Society.

Leader House, a Grade II listed Georgian townhouse takes its name from the Leader family, their home from the early C19.

== List of publications ==
- Reminiscences of Old Sheffield; its Streets and its People (1875)
- Life and Letters of John Arthur Roebuck Q.C., M.P. (1897)
- Sheffield in the Eighteenth Century (1901)
- History of the Company of Cutlers in Hallamshire in the County of York (1905–6)
