= Mi Amigo memorial =

World War II memorial in Sheffield, England

- Location: Endcliffe Park, Sheffield, South Yorkshire, England
- Coordinates: 53.368978°N 1.5078983°W
- Type: War memorial
- Material: Two bronze plaques, attached to a boulder
- Dedicated date: 1969
- Dedicated to: The ten crew members of Mi Amigo

The Mi Amigo memorial is a war memorial at Endcliffe Park, Sheffield, England, marking the World War II crash site of the USAAF B-17 Flying Fortress Mi Amigo.

== Air crash ==
On 22 February 1944, the USAAF B-17 Flying Fortress aircraft Mi Amigo, from the 364th Bomber Squadron, based at Chelveston, Northamptonshire, was returning from a bombing mission over Aalborg, Denmark, during which it was heavily damaged by enemy fighter aircraft. Around 5 pm, engines faltering, it emerged out of low clouds and crashed in the park. The entire crew (pilot 1st Lt. John Kriegshauser, co-pilot 2nd Lt. Lyle J. Curtis, navigator 2nd Lt. John W. Humphrey, bombardier 2nd Lt. Melchor Hernandez, flight engineer/top turret gunner S/Sgt. Harry W. Estabrooks, radio operator S/Sgt. Robert E. Mayfield, ball turret gunner Sgt. Charles H. Tuttle, waist gunners T/Sgt. George M. Williams and Sgt. Vito R. Ambrosio, and tail gunner Sgt. Maurice D. Robbins) perished. The pilot, John Kriegshauser, received a posthumous Distinguished Flying Cross.

The collision site is still visible from Rustlings Road and Ecclesall Road, which run past the park, due to a distinct decline in tree height on the hillside behind the café. This was due to the fact that twelve trees had to be cut down as a result of the crash's impact. Some of the surviving trees still have burn marks on their tops, which are visible in the winter.

== Memorial ==
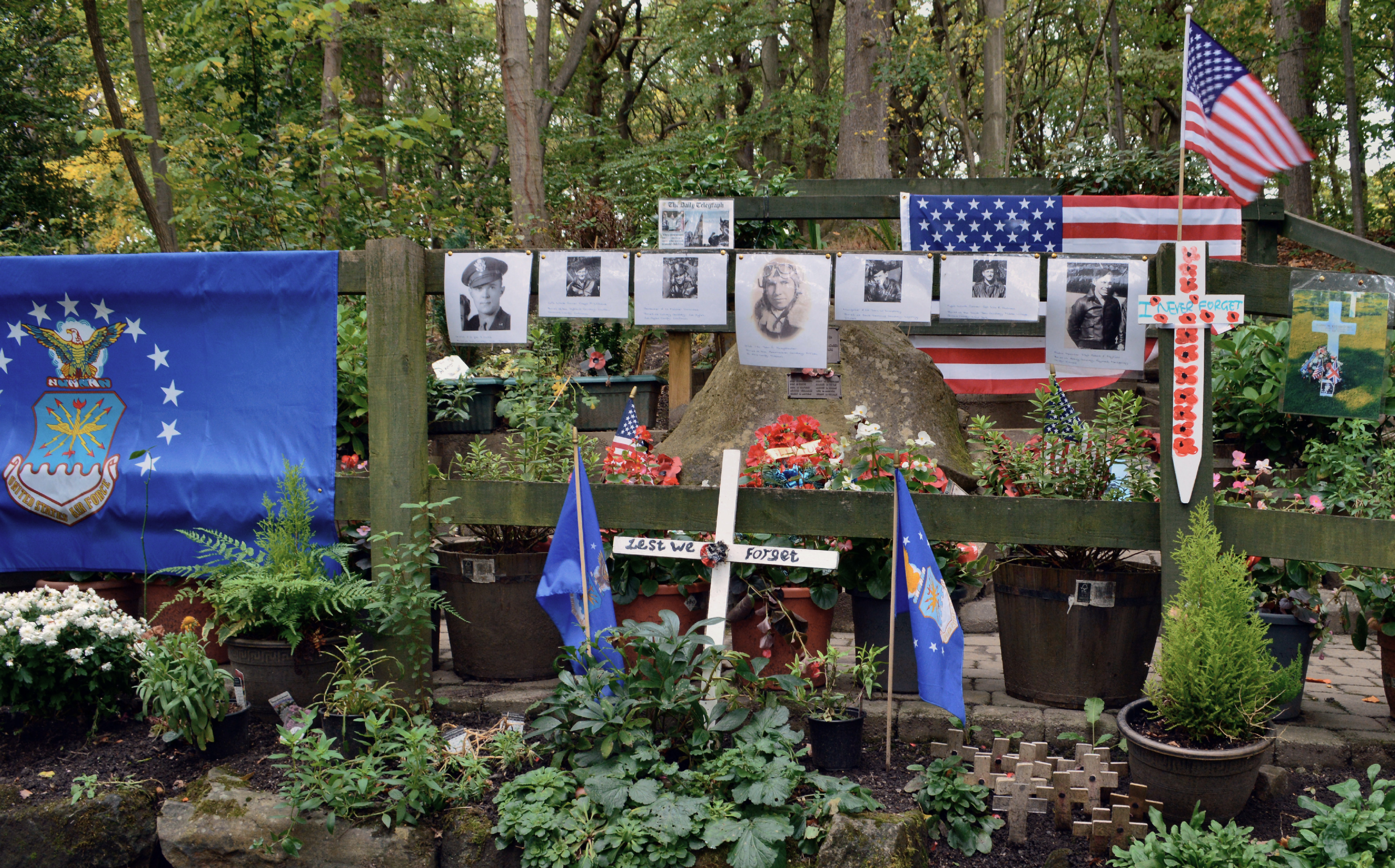
Mi Amigo memorial

A grove of ten scarlet oak trees (Quercus coccinea) was planted on 30 November 1969 as replacement trees to honour the crew, and on the same day a pair of memorial plaques attached to a large boulder were unveiled in a ceremony attended by the Lord Mayor of Sheffield, Alderman Daniel O'Neill; the Bishop of Sheffield, John Taylor, and Major General John Bell, Commander of the 3rd US Air Force in Britain. Since 2018, local man Tony Foulds has maintained the memorial, which for many years had been cared for by local military cadets, alongside the parks department, and Friends of Porter Valley. Mr Foulds' caretaking involves sweeping the path and watering the flowers in the Memorial Garden, which were all donated by garden centres and well-wishers.

An interpretation board including a wording and a painting of Mi Amigo, by South Yorkshire artist Paul Rowland was placed near the memorial by Sheffield City Council in time for the 75th anniversary of the crash in 2019. A flagpole was also erected, funded by donations by students from Birkdale (a local school) and Boeing Europe.

An annual memorial service organised by the Sheffield branch of the Royal Air Forces Association is held at the site on the Sunday closest to 22 February. The 2021 ceremony was not held due to the Coronavirus pandemic.

In summer 2023 the Sheffield branch of RAFA launched an appeal for funds to carry out a refurbishment of the memorial and immediate area. A GoFundMe page was created and within a few months the target funds of over £16,000 was raised.

Working together with Sheffield City Council the refurbishment work was carried out in December 2023 - January 2024 to improve disabled access to the memorial, increase visibility of the memorial and viewing opportunity from the pathway by carrying out the following work -

• complete replacement of the heavy timber posts and fences with lightweight painted steel posts and handrails;

• reordering of the uneven/sloping steps and provision of new and additional handrails

• Provision of additional display board and box for family and friend’s memorabilia

The 80th Anniversary memorial service took place Sunday 25 February 2024 with representatives of the RAF, US Air Force, US Embassy officials, Lord-Lieutenant of South Yorkshire and Sheffield City Council officials present.

=== Inscriptions ===
The upper of the two plaques reads (all in upper case):

Erected by
Sheffield R.A.F. Association
in memory of
the ten crew of U.S.A.A.F. bomber
which crashed in this park
22-2-1944
Per Ardua Ad Astra

The lower plaque lists the names of the ten crew members. Lt Kriegshauser (whose name is misspelled on the plaque was pilot; Lt Lyle Curtis (co-pilot); Lt John Whicker Humphrey (navigator); Lt Melchor Hernandez (bomb-aimer); Sgt Robert Mayfield (radio operator/log-keeper/photographer); Sgt Harry Estabrooks (flight engineer/top-turret gunner); Sgt Charles Tuttle (lower turret gunner); Sgt Maurice Robbins (rear-gunner); Sgt Vito Ambrosio (waist-gunner and assistant radio operator) and Sgt George Malcolm Williams (waist-gunner and assistant flight engineer).

== Flypasts for 75th & 80th Anniversaries ==
In January 2019, BBC Breakfast presenter Dan Walker met Tony Foulds. This led to Walker publicising Fould's wish for a commemorative flypast over the memorial.

On 22 February 2019, at 8:45 am, the United States Air Force (USAF) and Royal Air Force (RAF) carried out a fly-past to commemorate the 75th anniversary of the crash. The ten aircraft involved were, in order:

- Dakota ZA947 of the RAF's Battle of Britain Memorial Flight (flying from RAF Coningsby)
- MC-130J Commando II and CV-22 Osprey of the USAF's 352d Special Operations Wing (RAF Mildenhall)
- KC-135 Stratotanker of the USAF's 100th Air Refueling Wing (RAF Mildenhall)
- Two Typhoons of the RAF's 41 Squadron (RAF Coningsby)
- Four F-15E Strike Eagles of USAF 48th Fighter Wing (RAF Lakenheath), flying in missing man formation

The names of all ten of the Mi Amigo crew were painted onto the F-15Es. The F-15Es flew on to perform a second flypast at the American Cemetery and Memorial at Cambridge, where three of the crew are buried, the others having been repatriated.

Thousands of members of the public watched the flypast from the park, alongside relatives of the deceased air crew. BBC Breakfast was broadcast live from the event with family members of Lt Kriegshauser and Lt Hernandez as featured guests. The related hashtags "#RememberTheTen", "#MiAmigo75th" and "#sheffieldflypast" were trending on Twitter.

On 22 February 2024, at 11:00am, two F-15E Strike Eagles of the USAF 48th Fighter Wing from RAF Lakenheath, performed a fly-past to commemorate the 80th anniversary of the crash.
