= Sheffield Museums Trust =

Museum service in Sheffield, England

- Formation: 1 April 2021; 5 years ago
- Merger of: Sheffield Galleries and Museums Trust; Sheffield Industrial Museums Trust
- Type: Nonprofit
- Headquarters: Leader House, Surrey Street, Sheffield
- Region served: Sheffield
- Website: https://sheffieldmuseums.org.uk

Sheffield Museums Trust, is a charity created in 2021 to run Sheffield City Council’s museums and galleries. It was formed from the merger of Sheffield Galleries & Museums Trust (Museums Sheffield), and Sheffield Industrial Museums Trust. It currently manages six sites in the city: Graves Art Gallery, Millennium Gallery, Weston Park Museum, Kelham Island Museum, Abbeydale Industrial Hamlet, and Shepherd Wheel Workshop, as well as being responsible for the city's historic collections. Its mission is to be 'an ambitious, resilient, and united museums service that represents, celebrates, and inspires Sheffield'. It is run from offices at Leader House on Surrey Street.

== History ==
=== Predecessor organisations ===
Sheffield Galleries & Museums Trust, trading as Museums Sheffield, was a charity created in 1998 to run Sheffield City Council’s non-industrial museums and galleries. Museums Sheffield managed three sites in the city: Graves Art Gallery, Millennium Gallery and Weston Park Museum. Its offices were located at Leader House on Surrey Street. The trust was responsible for the care of the city's historic collections, including visual and decorative art, social history, archaeology and natural sciences. Its mission was 'to connect with our visitors, share stories about Sheffield and the wider world, and care for the city's collections'.

The Sheffield Industrial Museums Trust (SIMT) used to run the council's industrial museums: Kelham Island Museum, Abbeydale Industrial Hamlet, and Shepherd Wheel Workshop. The trust was originally created from a partnership between the City Council, Sheffield Hallam University and the Company of Cutlers in Hallamshire as Kelham Island Museum Ltd. in November 1994. It was reconstituted as the Sheffield Industrial Museums Trust in 1998 when the City Council passed to them control of the recently closed Abbeydale Industrial Hamlet and Shepherd Wheel. SIMT was commended by the Museums, Libraries and Archives Council for its repairs to Kelham Island after the 2007 floods.

=== Post-merger ===
Following years of collaboration, Museums Sheffield and SIMT merged on 1 April 2021 to form Sheffield Museums Trust.

== Sites ==
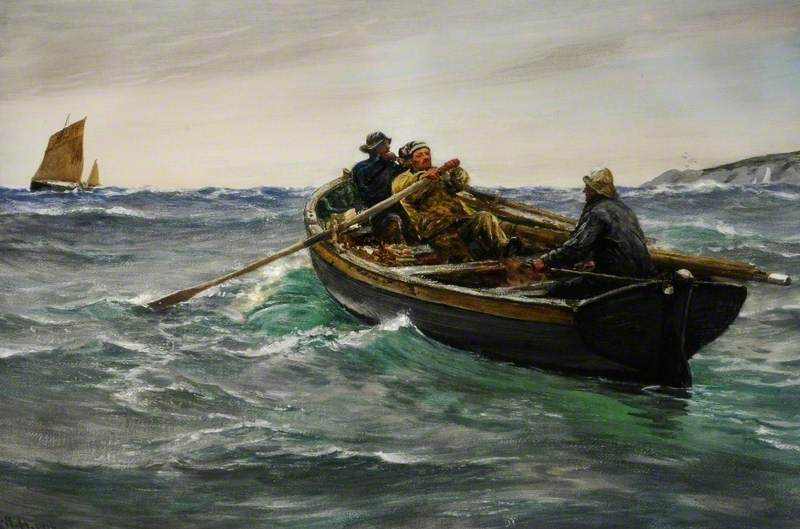
Charles Napier Hemy's A Pull to Windward, Falmouth, Cornwall, one of the paintings held by Sheffield Museums Trust

=== Non-industrial museums and art galleries ===
- Graves Art Gallery - an art gallery showcasing historic and contemporary British and European art
- Millennium Gallery - a museum housing collections and exhibitions relating to local history
- Weston Park Museum - Sheffield's largest museum with locally-themed exhibitions

=== Industrial museums ===
- Kelham Island Museum - a museum hosting exhibitions on Sheffield's industrial history
- Abbeydale Industrial Hamlet - former steel working site now run as a working museum
- Shepherd Wheel - a working 18th century water wheel and preserved workshop
