= Abbeydale Industrial Hamlet =

Industrial museum in South Yorkshire, England

Coordinates: 53.333679°N 1.512272°W

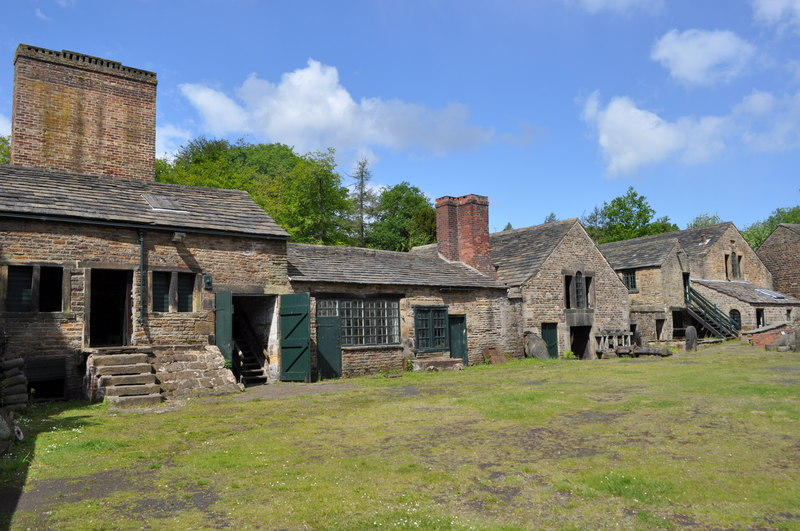
The site's Crucible Furnace building

Abbeydale Industrial Hamlet is an industrial museum in the south of the City of Sheffield, England. The museum forms part of a former steel-working site on the River Sheaf, with a history going back to at least the 13th century. It consists of a number of dwellings and workshops that were formerly the Abbeydale Works—a scythe-making plant that was in operation until the 1930s—and is a remarkably complete example of a 19th-century works. The works are atypical in that much of the production process was completed on the same site (in a similar manner to a modern factory). A more typical example of water-powered works in the area can be found at Shepherd Wheel.

The site is a scheduled monument, the works are Grade I listed and the workers' cottages, counting house, and manager's house are Grade II* listed.

== History ==
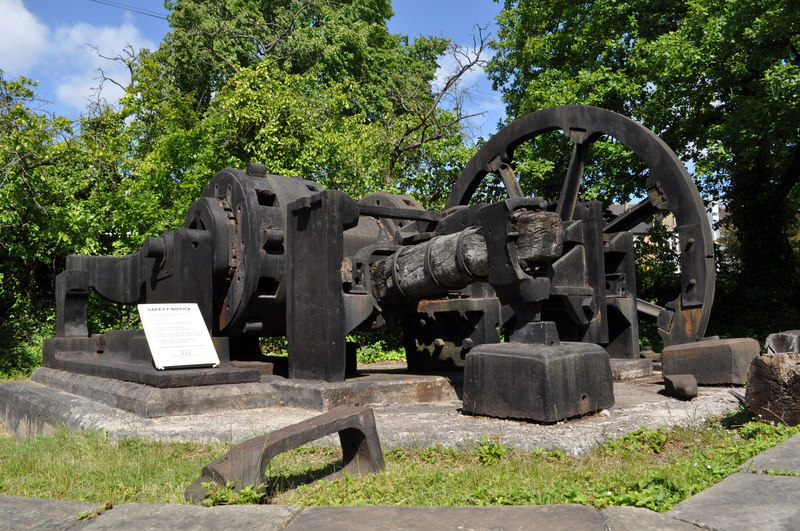
Jessop tilt hammer, Abbeydale Industrial Hamlet

The site was used for iron forging for 500 years, although there is evidence of other metal working before 1200. Its early history is intimately tied with the nearby Beauchief Abbey, which operated a smithy (blacksmith's shop) in the vicinity as well as number of mills along the River Sheaf.

A 1725 map shows that the fields, subsequently flooded to provide the dam at the site, had been called "Sinder Hills", the cinders referring to the waste resulting from prior lead smelting activities in the area in the 16th and early 17th centuries. However, the "Abbey Dale Works" as such, the buildings of which now form the Abbeydale Industrial Hamlet, are first formally recorded in 1714 (though it may have derived directly from the "New Wheel" operated by Hugh Stephenson, as detailed in rent books from 1685).

Development of the site continued with:

- 1777 enlargement of the dam
- 1785 construction of the tilt hammer
- 1793 construction of the workmen's cottages
- 1817 construction of the grinding hull
- 1838 construction of the manager's house
- 1840 construction of the coach house and stabling
- 1876 construction of the first storey warehouse (above the blacking shop).

From the 17th century onwards, the site primarily operated as a scythe works until, in 1933, it was closed by Tyzak Sons and Turner (tenants since 1849). In 1935 it was bought by the Alderman J. G. Graves Trust, which donated the site to the city. The works was briefly reopened during the Second World War to aid in Britain's war effort.

The Council for the Conservation of Sheffield Antiquities explored and initiated the restoration of Abbeydale Works in 1964. They discovered the remains of six buildings in addition to those still standing. These were identified from a 1924 map of the site as:

- a "disused hardening shop"
- a "disused open furnace shed"
- a "lime and coke shed"
- a "boiler house and chimney"
- the "housing for the steam engine"
- a "store for clay and anvils"

Following the complete restoration the works were finally opened as a museum in 1970. Sheffield City Council closed the museum in 1997 as a cost-cutting measure. It was then leased to the Sheffield Industrial Museums Trust who reopened the museum in 1998.

== The museum ==
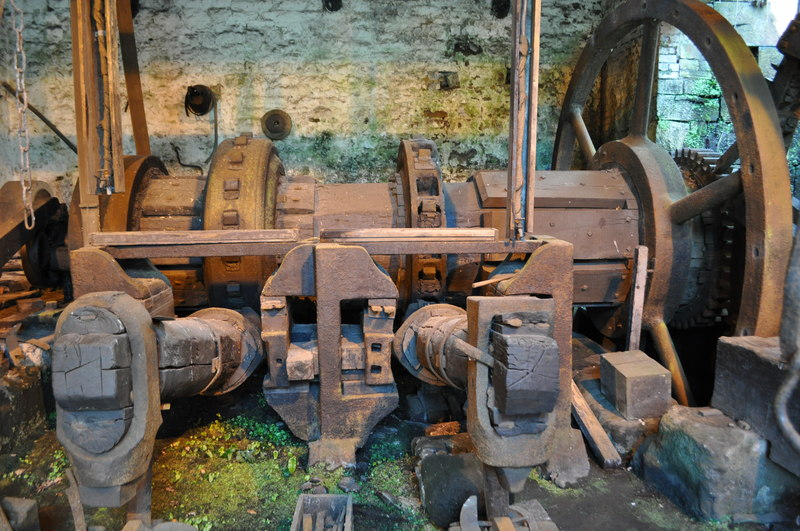
Water-powered, belt-driven machinery, Abbeydale Industrial Hamlet

Abbeydale Industrial Hamlet is run as a working museum, with works and buildings dating from between 1714 and 1876. The museum demonstrates the process making blister steel from iron and coke, then refining this steel using techniques that originated with Benjamin Huntsman's invention of the crucible steel process. The river provides water power via a water wheel. There are several wheels on the site for driving a tilt hammer, for the initial forging of the scythe blades; grinding machinery, which also has steam installed as backup for times of drought, and a set of bellows. The blades were also hand forged for finishing.

The museum is open Thursday to Sunday inclusive during peak season, and entry is free.

== See also ==
- Kelham Island Museum
- Shepherd Wheel
