= Millhouses Park =

Public urban park in Sheffield, England

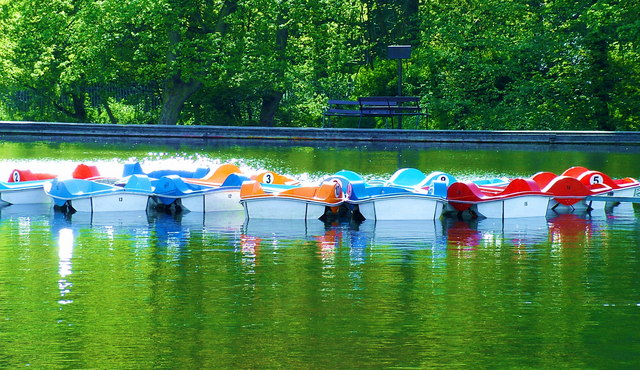
- The boating lake at Millhouses Park
- Interactive map of Millhouses Park
- Type: Urban park
- Location: Millhouses, Sheffield
- Coordinates: 53°20′32″N 1°30′3″W
- Area: 12.87 hectares (31.8 acres)
- Created: 1859
- Operator: Sheffield City Council
- Status: Open all year

Millhouses Park is a public urban park located in the Millhouses neighbourhood in south of Sheffield, England. It is a 12.87-hectare (31.8-acre) park stretching approximately 0.75 miles (1.2 km) along the floor of the valley of the River Sheaf, sandwiched between Abbeydale Road South (A621) and the railway tracks of the Midland Main Line.

== History ==
=== Early history ===
Before the park was created, the area had been used for farmland and small industrial sites, which had been built to take advantage of the power provided by the river. The Ecclesall corn mill—remnants of which can be seen at the north of the park—is recorded as early as 1299, when it was given by Robert de Ecclesall to the monks of Beauchief Abbey. The Skargell or Bartin wheel was located on the site of the present-day boating lake. It was a cutlers wheel that was constructed in the first half of seventeenth century and remained in use into the mid-nineteenth century.

In the late eighteenth century land at Millhouses, known as the Grange Ville Estate, was purchased by Peter Wigfall. He died in 1828 and the land passed to Thomas Whitehead under the terms of a will dated 1812. In 1837 William Speck filed a court case claiming that the will of 1812 was a forgery, and that he, as the closest living relative of Peter Wigfall should inherit the land. This case was dismissed, but in 1855 Joseph Oldale also claimed ownership of the land and took forcible possession of property at Millhouses, a siege ensued and eventually Oldale was removed. Legal proceedings followed, and in 1858 Oldale was charged with having fraudulently altered the parish records to bolster his claims. Whitehead sold the property to William Wentworth-Fitzwilliam, 6th Earl Fitzwilliam, but in 1875 Oldale's son William reasserted the family's claim to the land and forcibly took possession of property in Millhouses, including farmland that was leased by the miller of the corn mill and the inn keeper at the Waggon and Horses Inn (the future site of Millhouses Park). Once again the claim was unsuccessful and the land returned to Earl Fitzwilliam.

=== The park ===
In 1907 William Wentworth-Fitzwilliam, 7th Earl Fitzwilliam gave some of his land in Millhouses to the City of Sheffield. The City Council bought more land and laid out a public park. By the 1930s facilities at the park included a boating lake, an open-air swimming pool, paddling pools, a cricket pitch, bowling greens, and tennis courts. By the 1960s the park could attract up to 50,000 visitors on summer weekends.

In the 1980s, the lido (the successor of the open-air swimming pool) was closed, and in the 1990s the paddling pools were also closed due to fears of water pollution in the River Sheaf, which fed the pools.

In 2010, Splash Waterplay was opened, completing the renovation of the old Lido area. This now incorporates a traditional and adventure play area, skate park and Splash area. The old paddling pools were also filled and landscaped to form a 'fish ladder' which allows migratory fish to swim up-stream to spawn. It also creates several rock-pools and planting areas for wildlife to thrive.

Later in 2010, the old park-keeper's hut was taken over by the Park Cafe to provide refreshments to the play area. This also saw the banning of dogs in this area, with the installation of gates and fencing to surround the playgrounds. A sensory garden was established which has now matured to provide an oasis of calm within the park.

In 2011, Cliffhanger was once again held in the park and a new Outdoor Gym was opened next to the skatepark, along with a zipwire in the playground area. The park was also granted the Green Flag award for its excellent facilities, environmental sustainability and horticultural standards.

Plans for 2012 saw the installation of a children's cycle roadway, the old poplar trees were removed and replaced by an avenue of mature oak trees and improvements to the old Mill Buildings at the Northern end of the park during 2012 & 2013 saw the smaller mill building brought back to a usable state.

In 2014, Cliffhanger once again returned to Millhouses Park, following a short absence in Graves Park.

=== Flooding ===
As the park is situated on the valley floor alongside the River Sheaf it is occasionally flooded. On 1 July 1958 a severe flood damaged many of the facilities in the park and washed away a foot bridge across the river. It is now hoped that this bridge will be replaced in the near future, opening up an area of the park made inaccessible in 1958. On 25 June 2007, Ryan Joe Parry, a 14-year-old boy, was swept to his death in the park by the flooded river.

== Activities in the park ==
Millhouses Park shown in Sheffield

The park contains open grassed areas, woodlands, and floral displays.

Facilities on offer include:

- Football pitches
- All-weather 5-a-side pitch
- Crown Bowling greens
- Cricket pitch - home to Millhouses Works Cricket Club
- Boating lake for paddle boats and model/radio controlled boating
- Basketball court
- Children's play area
- Climbing Frame
- Skate park
- Adventure playground
- Zip Wire
- Splash Water Play
- Tennis courts
- 9-hole putting course
- Outdoor Gymnasium
- Heart Walk (signposted)
- Café serving gourmet food, drinks and ice creams
- Car Parking (Pay & Display)

The Millhouses Park Duck Race takes place each year, usually in conjunction with the Cliffhanger festival.

Every Saturday at 9 am, a parkrun (a free, weekly, timed 5 km run/walk) is held in the park.

There was previously a full-time funfair on the grassed area at the northern end of the park; it had to be removed when Yorkshire Water installed a large storm drain under this area of land.
