= Sheffield Round Walk =

14-mile footpath in South Yorkshire, England

Coordinates: 53.3676°N 1.5023°W

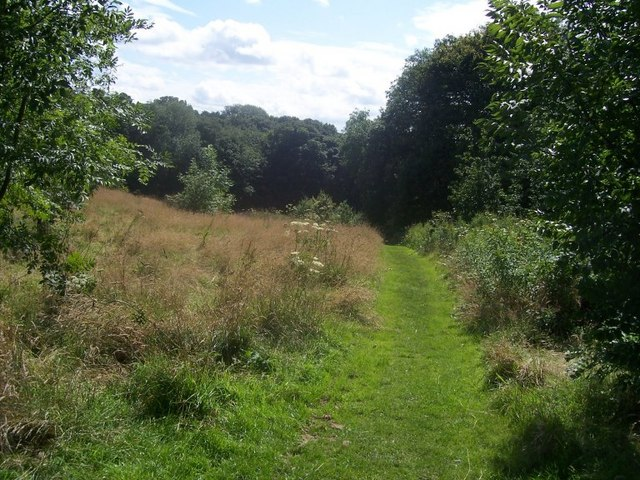
Part of Sheffield Round Walk in Graves Park

The Sheffield Round Walk is a 14 mi (23 km) walk through the south west of Sheffield, South Yorkshire, England. Starting from Hunters Bar, it travels along the Porter valley to Ringinglow. It then descends through the Limb valley and Ecclesall Woods to Abbeydale Road, before climbing through Ladies Spring Wood to Graves Park. The walk then passes through the Gleadless valley, Meersbrook Park and Chelsea Park before returning to Hunters Bar.

== Round Sheffield Run ==
The annual Round Sheffield Run event follows the route of the Sheffield Round Walk, starting from Endcliffe Park. It is typically held over the two days of the weekend of the last Sunday of June, and it is a fundraiser for the Weston Park Cancer Charity. The timed portions of the event split the route into 11 sections covering a total of 20 km (12 mi), separated by untimed sections that cover the remainder of the Walk's length.

The course record for two laps of the route is held by Cara George, Louis Rose and Matt Shorrock, who ran in 6:22:06 on 22 August 2025.
