= Endcliffe Park =

Park in Sheffield, South Yorkshire, England

Encliffe Park
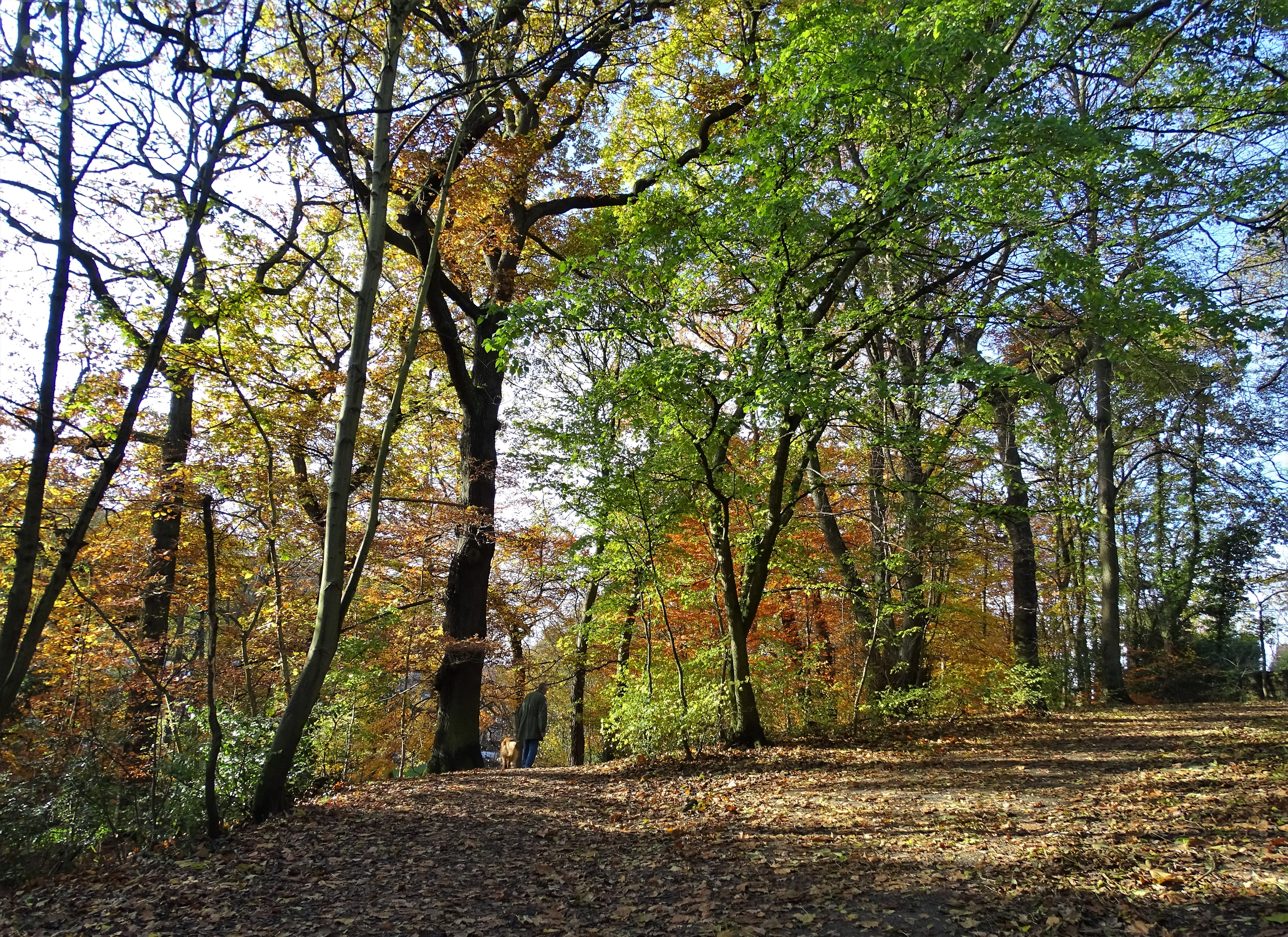
- A path through the Park

- Location within South Yorkshire
- Location: Rustlings Road in City of Sheffield, South Yorkshire, England
- Coordinates: 53°22′07″N 1°30′33″W
- Area: 19 acres (7.7 ha)
- Opened: 1887
- Website: https://www.sheffield.gov.uk/parks-sport-recreation/parks-gardens/parks-green-spaces

Endcliffe Park is a large park in the city of Sheffield, South Yorkshire, England. The park was opened in 1887 to commemorate the Jubilee of Queen Victoria. When one travels west from the city centre, it is the first in a series of parks and green spaces known collectively as the Porter Valley Parks, all of which lie along the course of the Porter Brook.

The next park in the sequence is Bingham Park, separated from Endcliffe Park by Rustlings Road. In 1924 Patrick Abercrombie said of the parks, "The Porter Brook Parkway, consisting as it does of a string of contiguous open spaces, is the finest example to be found in this country of a radial park strip, an elongated open space, leading from a built-up part of the city direct into the country, the land occupied being a river valley and so for the greater part unsuitable for building."

Endcliffe Park comprises parkland as well as woodland. The portion along Rustlings Road is grassy and used as a recreation ground whilst the northern border, separated from the recreation grounds by the Porter Brook, is woodland and is traversed by many paths.

The Ecclesall Road entrance to the park is next to the former Hunter's Bar toll bar on the former Sheffield and Chapel-en-le-Frith toll road. Next to the entrance is a Grade II listed pavilion and lodge, built in 1891.

== Monuments ==
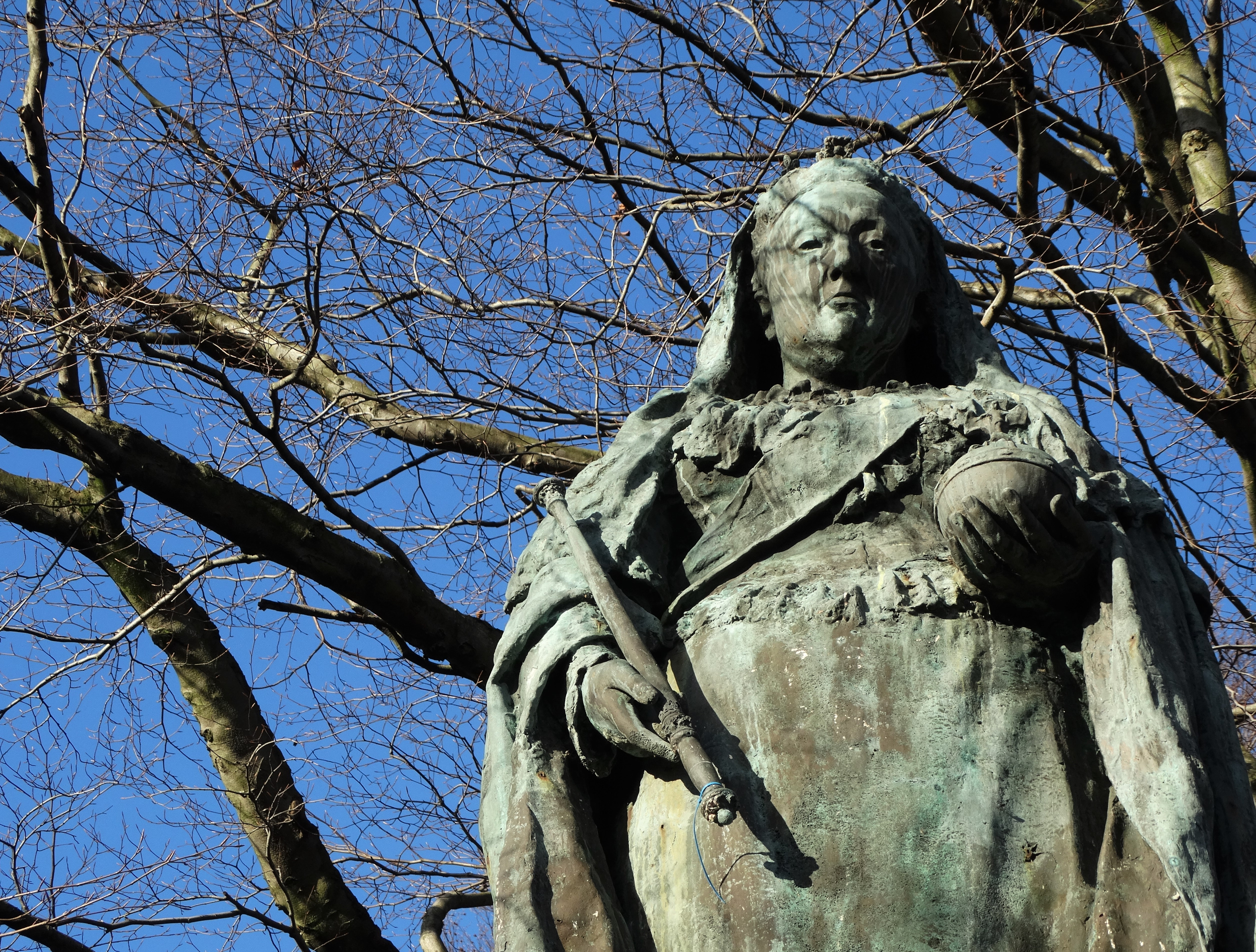
Erected by Citizens of Sheffield in honour of a Great Queen MDCCCCIV.

The park features three monuments dedicated to Queen Victoria. Near the entrance is a statue of Queen Victoria and midway up the path towards Whiteley Woods is an obelisk also in honour of Queen Victoria. Both originally stood at the top of Fargate in Sheffield city centre. In the centre of the park, enclosed by railings, is a pile of rocks arranged to form a dolmen. The top stone has a coat of arms and an inscription which refers to the founding of the park.

A tree planted by the Lord Mayor of Sheffield to commemorate Queen Victoria's Jubilee stands near her statue.

There is also a memorial stone marking the crash site of the USAAF B-17 Flying Fortress "Mi-Amigo" with a description board, installed by the Parks Department ahead of the 75th anniversary. The stone was put in place in 1969 after a fund-raising drive by the Sheffield branch of the Royal Air Force Association, who have since organised the annual service of remembrance. Ten American oak trees, one per airman, were planted by the City Council in 1969 and since then, if any have needed replacing, another tree has been planted in advance, as happened in 2019/20.

== Facilities and events ==
The park has a playground which was revamped in 2008 which has many attractions for children. The park also includes a parkour training facility which was built in 2014, funded by the Sheffield Parkour Movement group. There is also an outdoor gym area which includes pull up bars and self-weighted machines. All these facilities are currently free to use. There is also a family-friendly cafe which is open daily, serving a wide range of food and drinks. There are also toilet facilities and a small children's amusement area next to the cafe, and close to the park's entrance is the Hallamshire Tennis & Squash Club.

The park often hosts many events in the summer, such as circuses, musical events and a fair; including the Easter duck race event. The Folk in the Forest music festival is held in the park during the Tramlines Festival. The Endcliffe parkrun takes place weekly every Saturday at 9:00 am.

== Ponds ==
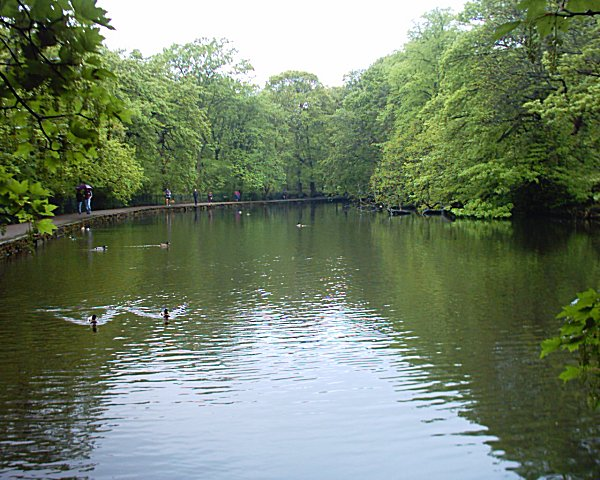
The second, and larger, pond

The Porter Brook, although flowing freely between the many old trees of the park, is dammed and forms two ponds, home of ducks and feral pigeons. The first pond, situated to the West of the park has an island. There is no access to the island. Like all the ponds along the Porter Valley, the ponds in the park are old mill ponds and retain their races that once drove a water wheel. In Endcliffe Park these have been semi-blocked to achieve an attractive waterfall effect. Endcliffe Park and many of the other parks and public spaces along the Porter Brook, are a re-claimed, pre-steam-age industrial landscape.

These days the ponds act as wildlife refuges, especially the island in the larger pond, with mallard, moorhen and coot resident, joined by a flock of black-headed gulls each winter. The ponds also enjoy frequent visits from grey herons and kingfishers throughout the year. The Porter Brook itself supports many more species, including the territories of dippers in its higher reaches. Grey wagtails frequently feed on insects just above the brook all along its length and are usually first glimpsed as a flash of bright canary yellow when strolling along those paths of Endcliffe Park that follow the course of the Brook.

== Special designations ==
- City Park
- Listed on English Heritage's Register of Parks and Gardens of Special Historic Interest in England
- Grade II listed features: Toll Gates, Jubilee Monument, Jubilee Obelisk, Pavilion & Lodge, Statue of Queen Victoria.
