= Porter Brook =

River in Sheffield, South Yorkshire, England

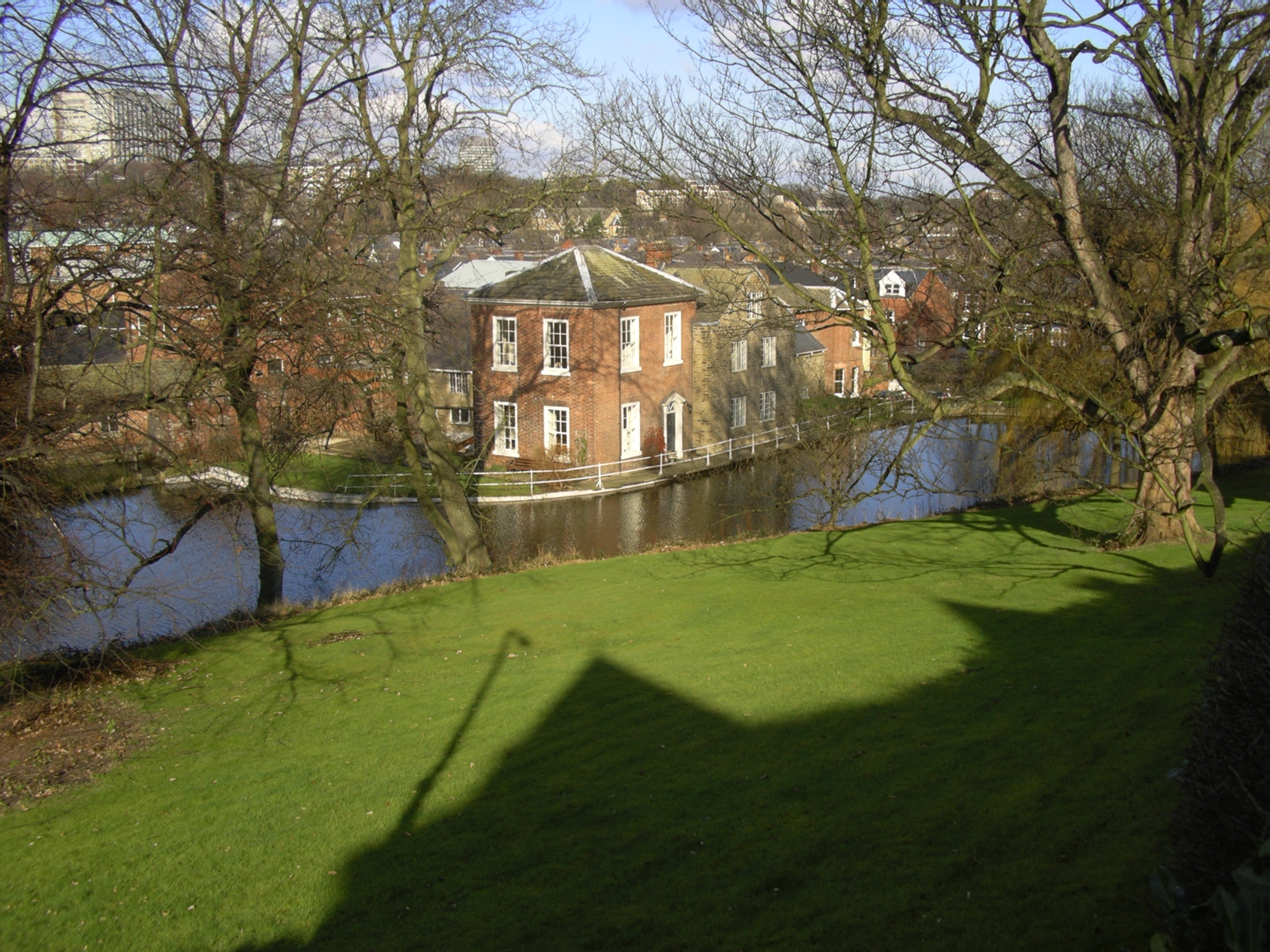
- The Porter Brook at Wilson's Sharrow Mill.

Location
- Country: England

Physical characteristics
- Source
  - location: Pennines
- Length: 6.5 mi (10.5 km)

The Porter Brook is a river which flows through the City of Sheffield, England, descending over 1,000 feet (300 m) from its source on Burbage Moor to the west of the city to its mouth where it joins the River Sheaf in a culvert beneath Sheffield railway station. Like the other rivers in Sheffield, its steep gradient made it ideal for powering water mills and works associated with the metalworking and cutlery industries, and around 20 dams were constructed over the centuries to facilitate this. At its lower end, it is extensively culverted, but parts of it are gradually being restored to open channels, as part of a daylighting scheme for the city.

The brook derives its name from its brownish colour, similar to the colour of Porter beer.

== Route ==
=== Source ===
The Porter Brook rises from a series of springs among the sedge grass of Burbage Moor, the highest of which is close to the 370-metre (1,210 ft) contour near Brown Edge Farm. Its source is just inside the Peak District National Park, to the north-west of the village of Ringinglow. It passes through Clough Hollow, and under Fulwood Lane, where it leaves the National Park. Nearby, at the junction of Fulwood Lane and Greenhouse Lane is a Rotary Club funded toposcope, Finder Cairn, a rotary orientation table which indicates the direction of local landmarks.

=== Porter Valley ===
Beyond Fulwood Lane the brook flows into the Porter valley. The valley is divided into a series of five green and open spaces, created along the river valley between 1885 and 1938 and collectively known as the Porter Valley Parks.

Just before it reaches the bridge carrying Woodcliffe over it, the river is joined by Mayfield Brook, which rises at a similar level but a little further to the north. Before the junction, Mayfield Brook supplied power to Fulwood corn mill, the highest mill on the system. Soon the combined flow reaches Forge Dam, now a large lake with an island. In Sheffield, "dam" referred to the body of water, rather than the structure which impounded it. Mills used for grinding were known as wheels, and the tail race was known as a goit.

Beyond Forge Dam, where the Porter is defined as a main river, the brook passes Wire Mill Dam, where there is a monument celebrating the life of Thomas Boulsover, the inventor of Sheffield Plate. The grade II listed structure was constructed in 1927 by a Master Cutler called David Flather, and may have been built from materials taken from the Wire Mill. Below Whiteley Wood Road bridge it is joined by a small tributary, flowing northwards from springs in the Porter Valley Woodlands Local Nature Reserve (LNR). Next it reaches Hangingwater Road bridge, a massive structure built around 1800, with two small segmental arches. Immediately below the bridge is the dam for Shepherd Wheel, with the buildings at its downstream end. The dam, goit, buildings and weir are grade II* listed, as internally, the machinery is complete and still operational. The site is run as a museum.

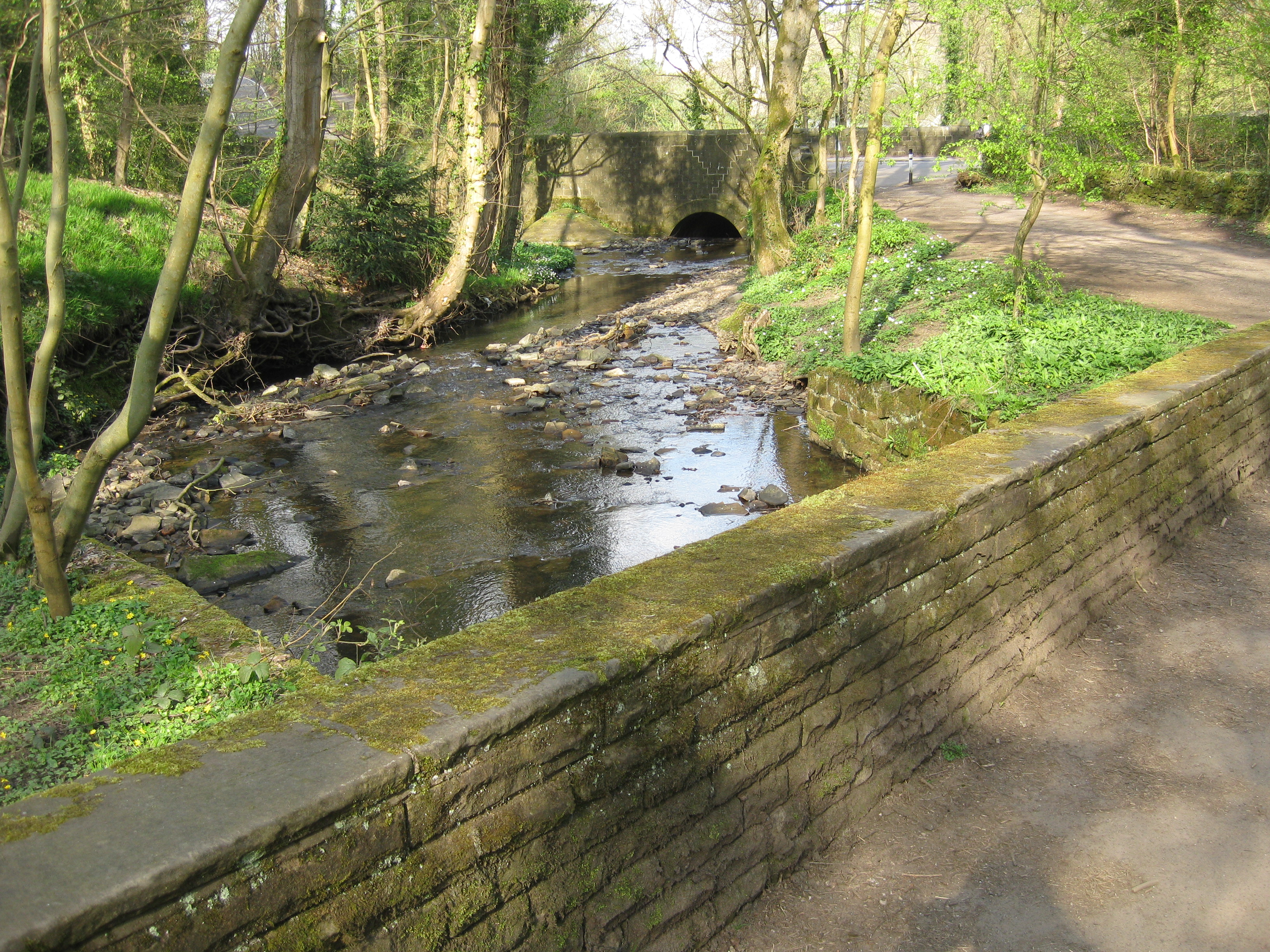
Hangingwater Road Bridge

The river continues through Whiteley Woods, passing Ibbotson dam before crossing under Oakbrook Road and back again to reach Nether Spurgear dam. Oak Brook flows southwards from the grounds of Tapton Hall to join the north bank, and Holme dam is close to the river as it enters Endcliffe Wood. 20 acres (8.1 ha) of land in Endcliffe Woods, at the eastern end of the linear park, was bought by Sheffield Corporation in 1885, to create public walks and pleasure grounds, but they also had another motive. The river at the time was a serious health risk, as sewage from newly built houses to the north of the river was flowing into the channel. Once they owned the woods, they were able to build a sewer through it. They then asked William Goldring to create a public park in the woods, which included gravelled paths, flower beds, ornamental shrubberies, rustic bridges, seating and a refreshment room. Several dams were repurposed, with Endcliffe dam used for bathing, Holme dam for skating, and Nether Spurgear dam for wildfowl.

In 1924, Sheffield's commitment to public spaces was recognised by Patrick Abercrombie in his Civic Survey, where he described the Porter Valley parks as "the finest example to be found in this country of a radial park strip, an elongated open space, leading from a built-up part of the city direct into the country."

=== Inner city ===
At the eastern end of Endcliffe Park the river is crossed by the B6069 Brocco Bank road, close to the roundabout on Ecclesall Road, now the A625. Ecclesall Road became a toll road in 1810, and the toll gate is situated in the centre of the roundabout, although it is not in its original location, as it was moved in the early 20th century. Beyond Brocco Bank is a small bridge built in 1899 to serve the George Woofindin almshouses, arranged in a crescent on the north side of the river. The river then enters a section of culvert, to emerge on the south side of Ecclesall Road, and weaves its way between housing to reach Sharrow Vale dam and snuff mill. The main building, dating from 1737 onwards, straddles the river, with a newer building dating from 1880 to the north, containing the original machinery which was still in use in 2004. At the eastern end of the buildings is a bridge dating from the late 18th century.

The river then runs parallel to Ecclesall Road along the north-western edge of Sheffield General Cemetery. The main gateway, built in Greek Revival style by the Sheffield architect Samuel Worth in 1836, incorporates a lodge on either side, and the whole structure is built on an elongated bridge across the river. After passing under Pear Street and Summerfield Street, it enters a site which was Ward's Brewery until it closed in 1999. It has been redeveloped as housing, although the original entrance arch has been retained. The river then enters the Waitrose culvert, which carries it under Harrow Street and a Waitrose supermarket. It appears again near the former Sheffield Union Banking Co building, which in 2021 was the Baan Thai Restaurant, before the St Marys Gate culvert takes it under London Road and the A61 St Mary's Gate. There is a short exposed section by the Theatre Deli car park and the Eyre Street culvert then passes under Eyre Street and the Decathlon sports shop, before the river re-emerges on the north side of Mary Street. It flows under Matilda Street Bridge, through the new Matilda Street Pocket Park and behind the BBC offices on Shoreham Street, before entering the Shoreham Street culvert beneath Leadmill Road and the A61 road. It surfaces briefly to run along the back edge of Sheffield Station car park, and enters the station culvert, which joins the culvert carrying the River Sheaf beneath the station platforms. The junction is beneath platform 5A, where there is a wooden access cover.

== Physical modification ==
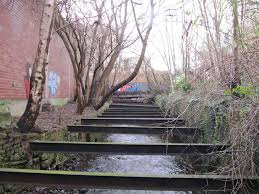
The Porter Brook before the Pocket Park

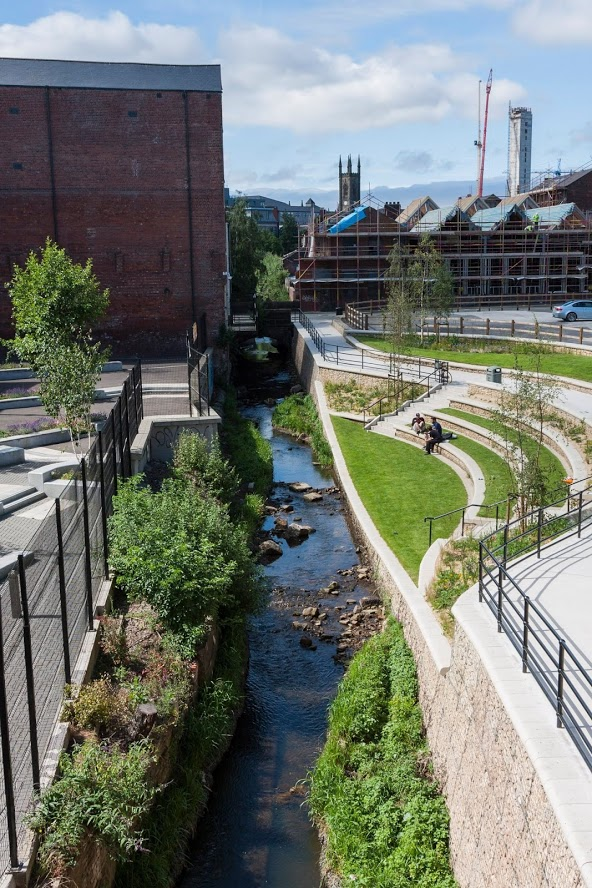
Matilda Street Pocket Park after completion

The river channel has been heavily modified over centuries. This has included the construction of dams to impound water for milling and metal working. The earliest mentions are of Shepherd Wheel, possibly in 1566 and certainly in 1584, while Mayfield corn mill on Mayfield Brook is mentioned in 1641. Expansion took place in the 18th century, and by 1780 there were 20 mills, with no obvious locations left where others could be built. Weirs were built with no thought for the ecology of the river, and while most were constructed to feed water into a dam at the side of the channel, the Fullwood mill impounded the whole of the flow of Mayfield Brook, as did Forge mill on the Porter Brook.

Below its junction with the River Sheaf, the tunnels which carry the combined waters under Sheffield Station and the Castlegate area have been celebrated by urban explorers and include a huge cavern known as the 'Megatron'. However, a significant proportion of the Porter Brook is also heavily culverted as it meets the city. The river in the vicinity of Matilda Street was rerouted into a new straight channel between 1797 and 1808, bypassing several meanders. The channel was still open in 1832, as shown by Taylor's map of Sheffield, but when the first Ordnance Survey map of the area was published in 1853, parts of the Porter Brook had been culverted, to allow housing and industrial buildings to be built. This included a bone mill, and later a timber yard, with further sections having been culverted by 1891 to accommodate industrial expansion.

Sheffield station opened in 1870, and was built over an area previously known as Sheaf Island, as it was hemmed in by the River Sheaf to the east, the Porter Brook cross link to the Sheaf to the south, and an unnamed dam, Bamford Dam and Pond Forge dam to the west. Both rivers had been diverted in the late 1700s, as the Bamford dam was built over the redundant course of the Sheaf, and around 1778 the Porter Brook was diverted along a cross link which ran due east to a new junction with the Sheaf. The Midland Railway bought the water rights in 1868, and effectively closed down Pond Forge. Both rivers were culverted to enable the construction of the station to proceed, and the cross link became the main channel of the Porter Brook when the dams were later filled in.

The Porter Brook is prone to flooding within the city, because it has been hemmed in to narrow channels between buildings, and passes through culverts that are of inadequate size for storm flows. Sheffield began to research the concepts of de-culvering or daylighting rivers in 2008, but found that while there were a significant number of documented projects, there were very few where the outcomes of the daylighting were critically assessed. They set about collecting such information through a web-based approach. In 2011 they embarked on two daylighting projects on the Porter Brook, one rural and one urban. The headwaters had been culverted in Victorian times, and these had been daylighted by 2013. The urban project was at Matilda Street, and took rather longer to complete, not being finished until 2016.

The chosen site is in Sheffield's Cultural Industries Quarter, close the buildings used by BBC Sheffield and the University Technical College on Shoreham Street. The river was in a channel with vertical sides, with steel beams running over it, before it disappeared into the Shoreham Street culvert. To the north was an area of derelict land, used for car parking, and the area was overgrown. A semi-circular amphitheatre was created, leading down to the river. A chance meeting been the landscape architect Sam Thorn and Paul Gaskell of the Wild Trout Trust near the start of the project led to a rethinking of how the river would be handled, and resulted in it being re-naturalised, rather than beautified. The pocket park has two main functions, for as well as providing public green space within an area of the city which has few such facilities, it is also designed to flood under storm conditions, slowing down the progress of water further downstream. Funding came from the council's City Centre Breathing Spaces programme, the South Yorkshire Forest Partnership, the Environment Agency Local Levy, because of its flood defence aspect, and the European Union under the Interreg IVB SEEDS project, which funded the feasibility study.

The project was announced as the winner in the Contribution to the Built Environment’ category at the 2016 Living Waterways Awards ceremony, held by the Canal and River Trust in Birmingham Town Hall on 14 September 2016. While the pocket park only covers 87 yards (80 m) of the river, the council are negotiating with other landowners and looking at redevelopment of some sites to extend the length of river that is improved. There are also proposals to create a walking and cycle route that follows the course of the river. One possible redevelopment site is Decathlon Sportswear, where part of the car park is unusable because the roof of the culvert collapsed into the river in January 2017.

Major engineering work took place at Endcliffe Park in 2004-5, to reduce the impact of overflows from the sewage system under storm conditions, and to reduce the likelihood of flooding on the lower river. In September 2014 Sheffield City Council announced plans for a flood alleviation scheme on the Porter Brook and its tributary the Mayfield Brook. It was planned to create floodwater storage areas at Mayfield, Whiteley Woods and Endcliffe Park while parts of the watercourse would be contained by walled defences downstream of Endcliffe Park. The work on the Porter Brook and the Sheaf was costed at £12.4 million, and was part of a larger project costing £56 million. Work started in 2015, and was expected to be completed in 2021.

== Water power ==
The Porter Brook, like the other rivers in Sheffield, is ideally suited for providing water power, as the final section falls some 450 feet (140 m) in a little over 4 miles (6.4 km). This enabled dams to be constructed reasonably close together, without the outflow from one mill being restricted by the next downstream dam. In addition to this water-power, natural sandstone was available in abundance in the nearby hills of Sheffield and the Peak District National Park. Lying at the edge of these hills, mill-owners found Millstone Grit was an easily extractable resource. By 1740 Sheffield became the most extensive user of water-power in Britain and probably in Europe. Ninety mills had been built, two-thirds of them for grinding. By 1850 these mills numbered well over 100. In the Porter valley alone 21 mill dams served 19 water-wheels, mostly used for grinding corn, operating forge-hammers, and rolling mills, grinding knives and the various types of blade that made Sheffield famous. Most were active during the 18th and 19th centuries.

- Fulwood Cornmill

A mill is known to have existed at Fulwood in 1641, when Ulysses Fox its builder appeared before the Court of Kings Bench changed with "trespass", as the rights to grind corn were owned by the manor. Despite having to pay £35 8s 9d (£35.43) the mill survived. Later, there were two wheels served by two dams lying between Mill Lane and Mark Lane in Mayfield Valley above Forge Dam. In 1760 the mill was used by Thomas Boulsover for the production of Sheffield-plate buttons. A steam engine was used at the Nether or lower mill from 1847, and both were unused by 1884. The complex was given to Sheffield Corporation in 1937, but most of it has since been demolished. Unlike most installations in Sheffield, the dam impounded the whole of the flow from the Mayfield Brook, with the result that the dam (the normal local term for the lake, rather than the structure that creates the lake) has completely silted up.

- Forge Dam (extant) c.1760 to c.1887

This workshop was built by Thomas Boulsover, the inventor of Sheffield Plate. It was also known as ‘Upper Forge’, ‘Whiteley Wood Forge’ and ‘Bottoms Forge and Tilt’ and was used for the manufacture of saws.

Sometime before 1900 the dam became a boating pool.

Thomas Boulsover first used this site for the production of writing paper, but this was unsuccessful, as the water contained ochre. By 1765, it had become a forge and rolling mill, and by 1832 was used for the production of saws, while two drop-hammers were used to beat heated metal ingots into wrought-iron. Two water wheels were supplemented by a steam engine in 1835, and the operation ceased around 1887. A showman called Herbert Maxfield used the dam as a boating pool between 1900 and 1920, and the site was bought by Sheffield Corporation in 1939. The workers’ cottages became a café. The 40-foot (12 m) weir is still in good condition, but the dam has suffered from silting, as its layout was similar to the Fulwood dam.

- Wiremill Dam (extant) c.1761 to c.1876 – Previously Whiteley Wood Rolling Mill, also known as Bowser Bottom or Thomas Boulsover's Rolling Mill.

This workshop was built by Thomas Boulsover, the inventor of Sheffield Plate. It was originally part of ‘Whiteley Wood rolling mill and a saw works’.

The mill produced thin steel plate suitable for sawplate and for other items fashioned from strip steel, and wire used mainly in the cutlery industry. Wiremill Dam was once the site of the largest diameter water-wheel in Sheffield. Two overshot wheels were recorded in 1829, each 34.5 feet (10.5 m) in diameter and 4.25 feet (1.30 m) wide. They rotated at 6 rpm and were fed by a head of water of about 10 feet (3.0 m).

It gained its Wire Mill name in 1855 when it was used for wire drawing.

- Nether Wheel 1754 to c.1891

This workshop was also known as ‘Porter Wheel’, ‘Holme Wheel’, and ‘Whiteley Wood Bottoms Wheel and Shops’. It had a 20ft fall, six working troughs, and was used for cutlery grinding until 1891.

By 1901 the mill was declared ‘empty’ and demolished in 1907.

- Shepherd Wheel (extant)

This was originally called Porter Wheel, and was mentioned in a will read in 1566. From 1749, it was leased to Edward Shepherd, and the wheel was then known by his name. He worked there until he died in 1794, when it passed to his son-in-law. Samuel Hind began working there when aged ten in 1818, and the Hind(e) family were associated with it until about 1930, when commercial operation ceased. The leaseholder was John Eyre, who bought the wheel from the Duke of Norfolk's estate in 1811, and ownership passed to Sheffield Corporation in the late 1890s, although the transaction was not completed until 1908. After 1930, the wheel was maintained and occasionally demonstrated by the forerunner of the South Yorkshire Industrial History Society until 1941. Its condition deteriorated, and it was almost demolished, but the Council for the Conservation of Sheffield Antiquities renovated it, and it was given to the City Museums. It is now run as a museum by the Sheffield Industrial Museums Trust.

- Ibbotson's Wheel (extant) 1754 to 1902 – previously Upper Spurgear Wheel or 4th Endcliffe Wheel.

This workshop was also known as ‘New Wheel’, and ‘Cutler Wheel’. It became ‘Ibbotson Wheel’ in 1775 and had a 22ft fall of water with 11 working troughs.

The first wheel on this site was erected by Stephen Hawksworth in 1754, but it was operated by Josepoh Ibbotson from 1759, and became known by his name from 1775. After his death, it was bought by Ebenezer Marsden, who opposed the Water Works Bill in 1835, and was charged an extra £7 rate because of his stance. In 1847, the wheel was subjected to rattening, when unknown people entered the building and broke five of the grindstones. Ownership was transferred to Sheffield Corporation, who gave the Ibbotsons notice to quit in 1902. A proposal in the 1930s for it to become an industrial museum came to nothing, and it was demolished around 1950. During the early 1900s the dam became Porter Glen Boating Lake.

- Nether Spurgear Wheel (extant) 1749 to c.1875 – also known as 3rd Endcliffe Wheel

Initially this workshop had 10 working troughs. By 1830 it had been enlarged to include 17, which were driven by a 23ft diameter wheel. Nether Spurgear Wheel was mainly used to power a cutlers’ workshop, with a brief period being used by a filesmith.

- Second Endcliffe Wheel
- Holme Wheel (extant) 1724 to c.1891 – also known as Nether Mill, Leather Wheel, or Whiteley Woods Bottoms Wheel (1754).

When first built, this workshop had 4 working troughs which were used by cutlers. It was rebuilt in 1769 and by 1830 had expanded to 17 troughs to produce high quality blades.

Endcliffe Park was re-opened in 1887 to commemorate the Jubilee of Queen Victoria following major re-design and landscaping by landscape architect William Goldring. From about 1903 the dam was used as a boating lake.

Porter Valley Parks are all part of the Sheffield Round Walk.

- First Endcliffe Wheel – 1706 to c. 1891

This workshop was also known as ‘Elcliffe Wheel’ and was used for the manufacture of scissors. It had a 19ft fall of water and later had 10 working troughs used for knife grinding. The dam was used as a bathing pool from about 1903 until 1938. It was closed at the outbreak of World War II. Some 20 years later it was drained and filled in.

- Upper Lescar Wheel This cutlers wheel and the Nether Lescar Wheel took their names from the marshy area, Leeche Carr by the Porter Brook, carr (or kjarr) being Old Norse for a wetland undergoing transition to a woodland. The wheel existed in 1587. This dam was to supply power to the Porter Steel Works until 1890 when the works closed.
- Nether Lescar Wheel Dam Records indicate that this cutlers wheel existed in 1587. In 1630 John Bamforth paid £2-00 and two hens per annum to the Lord of the Manor to rent this wheel. This dam also supplied power to the Porter Steel Works.
- Porter Works Dam

Both Lescar Wheels and Porter Works Dams were drained to provide housing between Ecclesall Road and Sharrow Vale Road.

- Sharrow Mills

Sharrow Wheel was in use by cutlers by 1604, and was sometimes known as Bamforth Wheel, as it was leased to members of the Bamforth family from then until 1719. In the mid 1740s, Joseph Wilson enlarged the wheel, and in 1757 plans were drawn up for changes to the tail goit, which was carried under the river in a culvert, to rejoin the river further downstream. A snuff mill was erected in 1763, and the cutler wheel was not mentioned subsequently. The Wilson family bought the freehold from the Duke of Norfolk's estate in 1798, and have run the mill ever since. The water-powered snuff grinding equipment remains in place, although it is no longer used to grind snuff commercially.

- Stalker Wheel also known as Three-Square Dams

Lying between Ecclesall Road and the high wall stone wall of Sheffield General Cemetery.

- Sharrow Forge

Drained and filled in, c. 1870. The land was developed to build houses in Napier Street and St Matthias Primary School.

- Broomhall Cornmill

Also drained and filled in, c. 1870.

- Bennett's Wheel also known as Little Sheffield Moor or Vulcan Works Dam

The original grinding wheel (1810–1851) closed and the dam was leased to the Vulcan Works a forge, and rolling-mill providing water for boilers.

- Leadmill Dam also known as Marriott's Wheel (1732–1780s).

The White Lead Works was erected in 1759 producing pigments for paint and pottery glazes and continued in use until the later 19th century. When it closed, the dam was filled in and the site used to construct a tram-depot c. 1910.

- Ponds Lane Dam

The Peak Park Anniversary Cycle Route follows the Porter Brook from Bingham Park to Porter Clough near Ringinglow.

== Water quality ==
The brook derives its name from its brownish colour, similar to the colour of Porter beer. The discolouration is created as the water passes through and over local iron-ore deposits.

The Environment Agency measure the water quality of the river systems in England. Each is given an overall ecological status, which may be one of five levels: high, good, moderate, poor and bad. There are several components that are used to determine this, including biological status, which looks at the quantity and varieties of invertebrates, angiosperms and fish. Chemical status, which compares the concentrations of various chemicals against known safe concentrations, is rated good or fail. The Porter Brook is designated as "heavily modified", which means that the channels have been altered by human activity, and the criteria for this designation are defined by the Water Framework Directive.

The water quality of the Porter Brook was as follows in 2019.

Section	Ecological Status	Chemical Status	Length	Catchment	Channel
Porter from Source to River Sheaf	Moderate	Fail	4.8 miles (7.7 km)	6.59 square miles (17.1 km^{2})	heavily modified

The water quality in the river has deteriorated since 2013, when it was rated good for ecological status. Like most rivers in the UK, the chemical status changed from good to fail in 2019, due to the presence of polybrominated diphenyl ethers (PBDE), perfluorooctane sulphonate (PFOS) and mercury compounds, none of which had previously been included in the assessment.

== Sheaf & Porter Rivers Trust ==
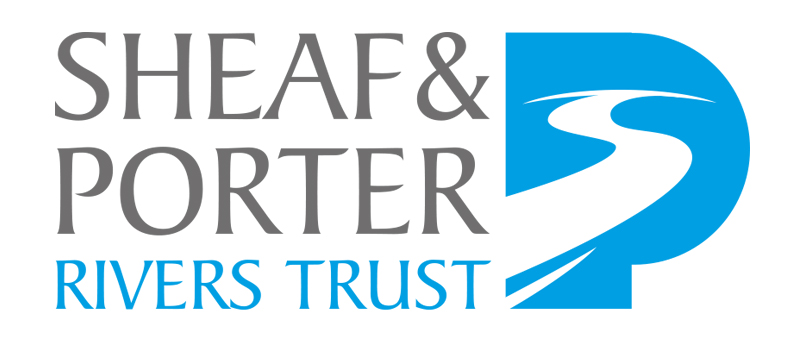
The logo of the Sheaf & Porter Rivers Trust

The Sheaf & Porter Rivers Trust is a voluntary organisation set up on 15 May 2019, to promote public awareness of the two urban rivers and their gradual regeneration.

The trust is one of several organisations which promote remediation of these rivers, including Sheffield Corporation. The trust believe that remedial action on the lower Sheaf and Porter would improve biodiversity, as well as the health and wellbeing of the increasing population of the inner city. At the time of its formation, there were significant re-development projects taking place on the lower Porter, which gave scope to improve the level of daylight on the river and to create public spaces. A retail outlet has been persuaded not to replace the culvert roof where their car park had collapsed into the river, and the Trust are working with the Environment Agency to ensure that the exposed river gets re-naturalised. They have also negotiated with the BBC, where the river runs beneath the car park. It included a section where the exposed river was totally overgrown, to the extent that the owners did not realise there was a river. As of May 2022, the intention is to cut back the growth and so let light into the river.

The Trust are also promoting the creation of a larger park where the combined waters of the Porter and Sheaf flow into the Don. The final culvert through which they run is decaying, and the trust would like to see it removed. They would also like to see light wells added throughout the rest of the culverts, to enable wildlife to pass through them to reach the upper rivers, and believe that redevelopment as part of the HS2 high speed rail link could be the catalyst for that to take place. They are also seeking a continuous path along the river bank, joining the current disconnected sections.

== Popular culture ==
The river is one of several which inspired the song "Wickerman" by Pulp.

The Sheffield morris dance group, Five Rivers Morris, who take their name from the city's waterways, have a dance called 'Porter' after the Porter Brook.

The Porter Brook featured heavily in a 2016 BBC Radio 4 documentary entitled "A River of Steel", produced by sound recordist Chris Watson, ex-member of Caberet Voltaire. The programme included discussion of the recently completed Porter Brook daylighting scheme, which also featured in an article in The Guardian newspaper.

== Points of interest ==
Point	Coordinates (Links to map resources)	OS Grid Ref	Notes
Junction with River Don	53.3853°N 1.4622°W	SK358877	by Blonk Street bridge
Start of Sheffield Station culvert	53.3771°N 1.4632°W	SK358868	
Porter Brook daylighting scheme	53.3756°N 1.4679°W	SK354866	
Start of St Mary's Gate culvert	53.3725°N 1.4818°W	SK345863	
Sharrow Snuff Mill	53.3685°N 1.4930°W	SK338858	
A625 Ecclesall Road bridge	53.3685°N 1.4990°W	SK334858	
Oakbrook Road bridge	53.3685°N 1.5205°W	SK320858	
Fulwood Lane bridge	53.3532°N 1.5742°W	SK284841	
Clough Hollow	53.3530°N 1.5780°W	SK281840	source

== Bibliography ==
- Armstrong, Julia (16 April 2020). "Fancy a pint of Ward's". The Star. Archived from the original on 27 April 2020.
- Ball, Christine; Crossley, David; Flavell, Neville (2006). Water Power on the Sheffield Rivers: Second Edition. South Yorkshire Industrial History Society. ISBN 978-0-9556644-0-3.
- Cox, David (29 August 2017). "A river runs through it". The Guardian. Archived from the original on 4 October 2020.
- DCRT (3 November 2018). "Porter Brook Pocket Park – Bringing the river back to the surface" (PDF). Don Catchment Rivers Trust. Archived (PDF) from the original on 7 February 2021.
- Gregory, Sam (8 August 2019). "Uncovering Sheffield's lost waterways". Now Then magazine. Archived from the original on 26 November 2020.
- Griffiths, Andrew (11 September 2017). "The hidden stream which became a vital part of city's flood defences". Yorkshire Post. Archived from the original on 6 February 2021.
- Ogden, Simon (12 February 2017). "Hidden rivers of Sheffield". Caught by the river. Archived from the original on 8 February 2021.
- Tarkovsky (January 2018). "Porter Brook culverts". 28dayslater.com. Archived from the original on 1 March 2020.
- UED Team (March 2013). "Porter Brook Pocket Park". Sheffield City Council, Urban & Environmental Design Team.
- Wild, T. C.; Dempsey, N.; Broadhead, A. T. (April 2019). "Volunteered information on nature-based solutions — Dredging for data on deculverting" (PDF). Urban Forestry & Urban Greening. 40 (1): 254–263. doi:10.1016/j.ufug.2018.08.019.
