= Shepherd Wheel =

Shepherd Wheel Workshop
- Location within Sheffield
- Location: Whiteley Woods, Sheffield, England
- Coordinates: 53.3645°N 1.5245°W
- Type: Industrial museum
- Owner: Sheffield Museums Trust
- Website: www.sheffieldmuseums.org.uk/visit-us/shepherd-wheel-workshop/

Shepherd Wheel is a working museum in a former water-powered grinding workshop situated on the Porter Brook in the south-west of the City of Sheffield, England. One of the earliest wheels on the River Porter, it is one of the few remaining—and effectively complete—examples of this kind of enterprise, one that used to be commonplace in the Sheffield area. Its 5.5 m (18 ft) diameter overshot water wheel is powered from a large dam stocked with water diverted from the Porter Brook. The workshops, dam, goit and weir are Grade II listed, and the site is a Scheduled Ancient Monument.

== History and buildings ==
In 1584, William Beighton, a cutler of Stumperlowe left to his sons in his will: "all my interest terms titles and possession which I have in and upon one watter whele called Potar Whele which I have of the grant of the said Lord". This is the earliest reference to a wheel on the site. The description of this wheel matches one that Edward Shepherd – after whom the site is now named – held the tenancy of in 1794. There were no similar wheels in the area, which leads us to the conclusion that the references are to the same wheel.

The present buildings date from c. 1780. Throughout the 19th century the wheel was held by the Hinde family, who operated it until its closure in 1930.

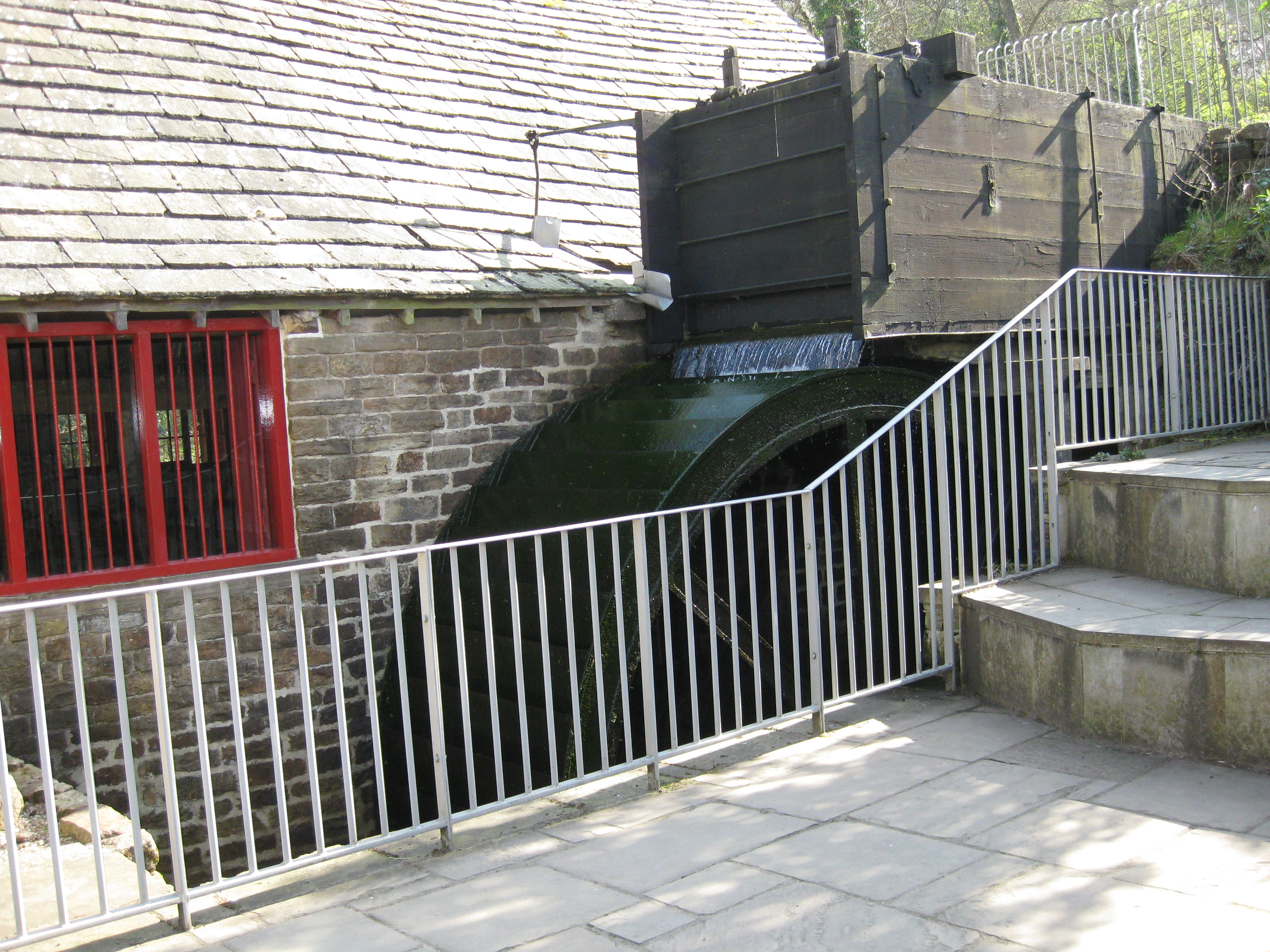
Shepherd Wheel water wheel

In William Beighton's time, the land was originally owned by Gilbert Talbot, 7th Earl of Shrewsbury, who was Lord of the Manor of Sheffield. When he died, his estates passed to Thomas Howard, who became Duke of Norfolk. The land remained with the Dukes of Norfolk until 1900, when Sheffield City Council bought Whiteley Woods to make a public park. The sale also included Shepherd Wheel itself. After a campaign by local history societies, the wheel was restored and opened as a museum in 1962. The museum was closed in 1997 and passed to the management of the Sheffield Industrial Museums Trust in 1998.

== Museum ==
Since 1998, Shepherd Wheel has been run as a museum by the Sheffield Industrial Museums Trust (now the Sheffield Museums Trust). The museum includes a water wheel, two grinding hulls (rooms with multiple large grinding wheels, operated by the water wheel, built into the floor) and grinding wheels; there is also a collection of tools and equipment on display within the grinding hulls.

The Shepherd Wheel reopened (after a restoration project partly funded by a £500,000 Heritage Lottery grant) on 31 March 2012.

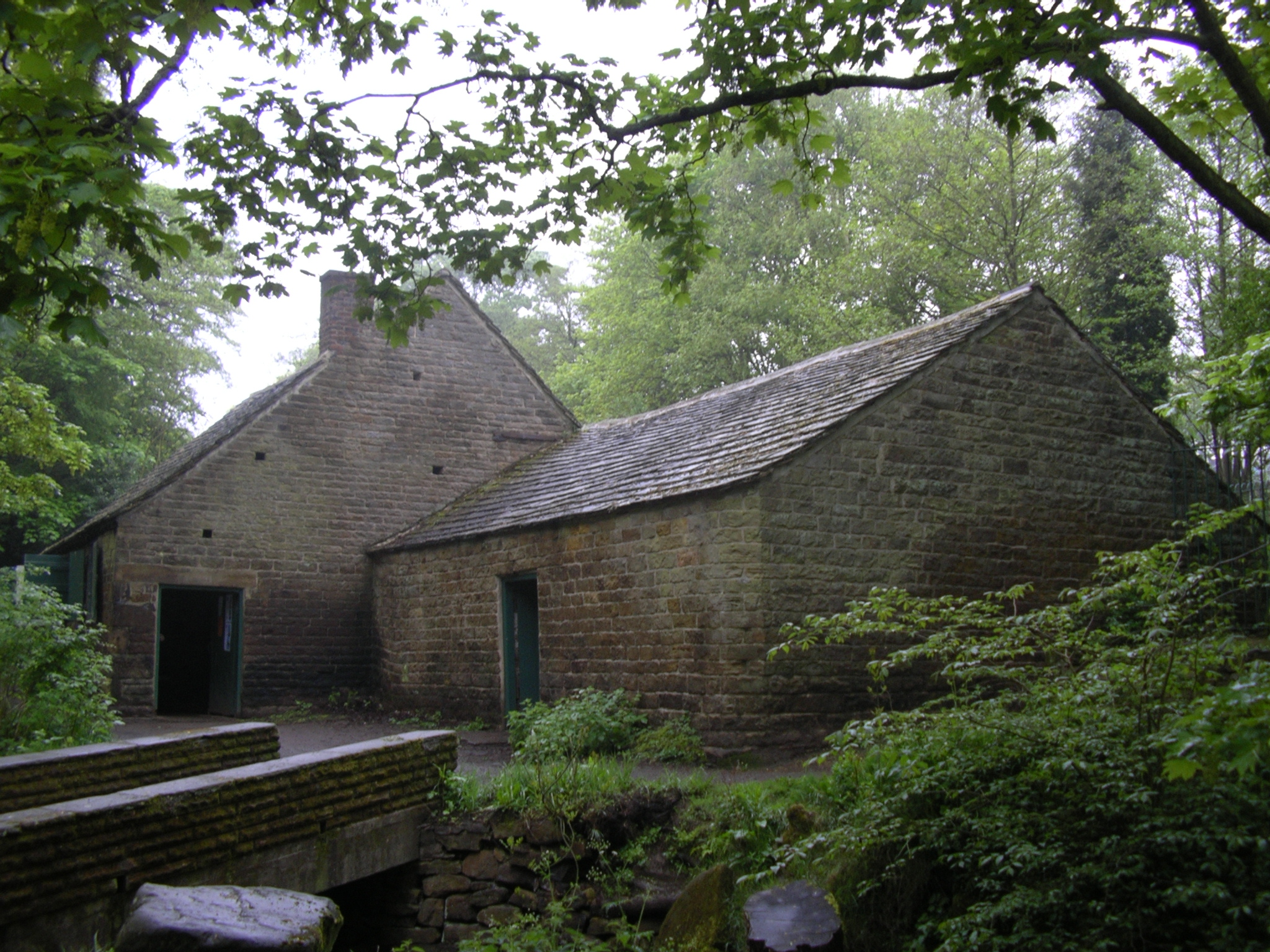
Buildings

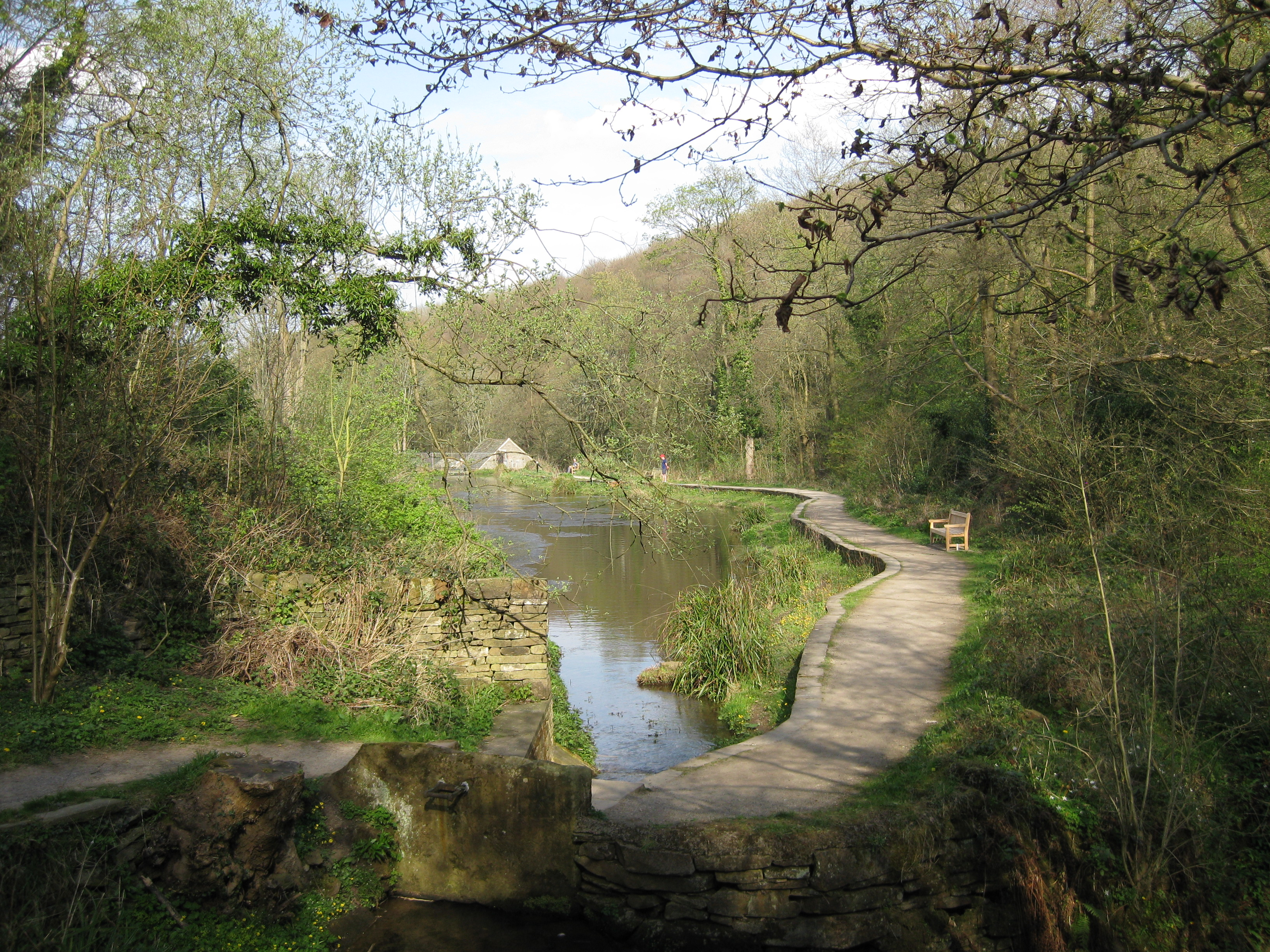
Millpond

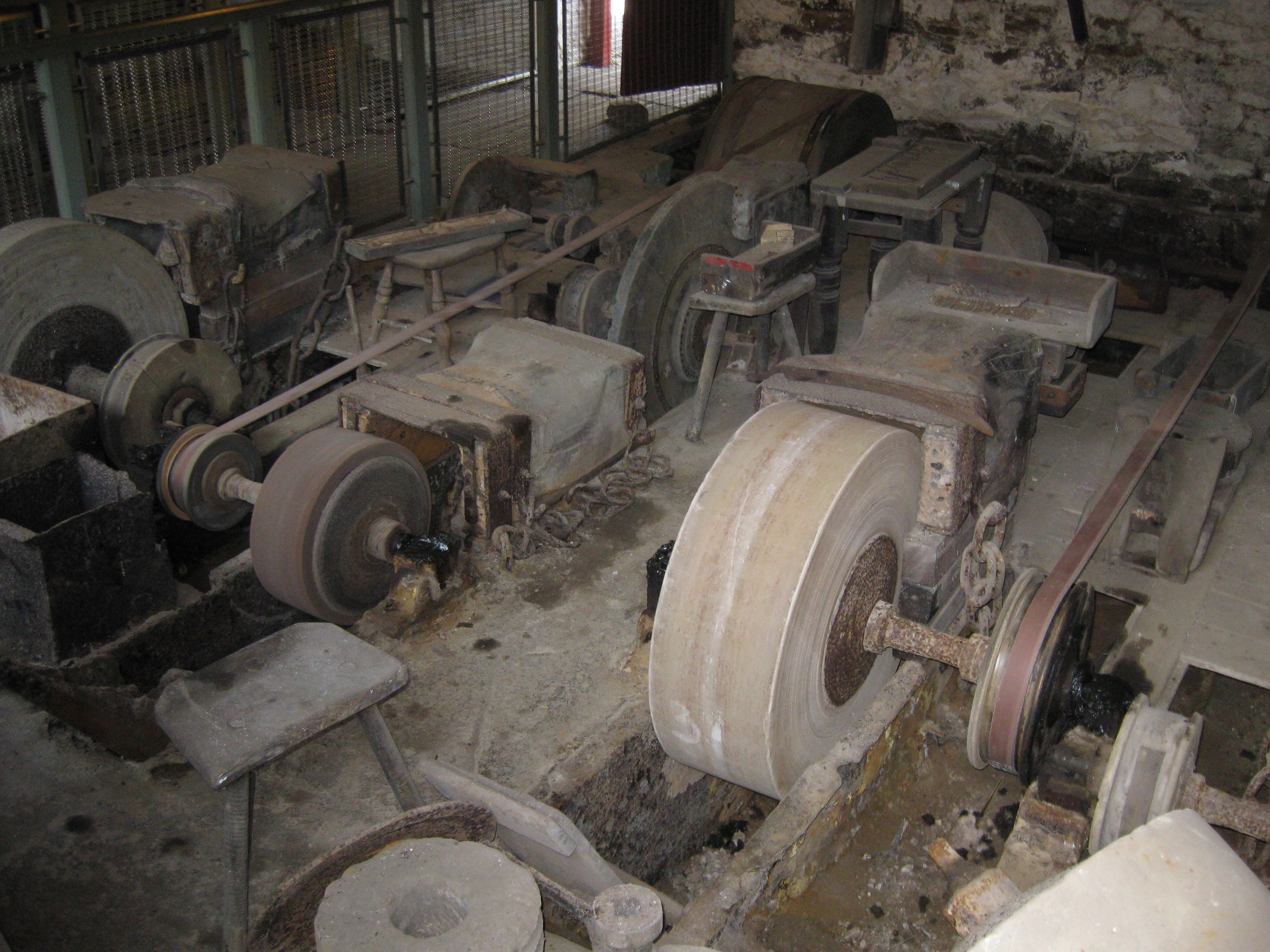
Grinding wheels in a workshop

== See also ==
- Abbeydale Industrial Hamlet
- Kelham Island Museum
- Listed buildings in Sheffield
