= Sheffield district rail rationalisation plan of the 1960s =

The Sheffield District Rail Rationalisation Plan was a series of linked railway civil engineering projects, station and line closures and train route changes that took place in and around Sheffield, South Yorkshire. The majority of these changes took place in the 1960s and early 1970s, however the plan, by now much modified in the face of rapidly dwindling freight traffic, was not fully realised until the 1980s.

== History ==
In the 1960s, the Sheffield area was one of the busiest areas in the country for rail traffic, in particular for freight traffic: a British Rail Board report showed that 10% of the country's rail freight emanated from the Sheffield area. The facilities that existed, however, were built by competing railway companies in the 19th century and were cramped and outmoded. In an era of central government economic planning this was seen as a constraint on Britain's economic growth; government money was made available to relieve these bottlenecks. At the same time, passenger facilities in Sheffield were to be made more convenient, representing the need for faster and more frequent trains on fewer routes stopping at fewer intermediate stations, but allowing more convenient changing between trains for the remaining local and long-distance express trains.

== The Plan ==
The major part of the rationalisation plan involved:

- The concentration of passenger services on Sheffield Midland and the closure of Sheffield Victoria.
- The closure of Rotherham Central and the concentration of services on Rotherham Masborough.
- The concentration of parcels traffic and goods transshipment on a new 'Sheffield Freight Terminal' built on a site adjacent to the former Midland Railway locomotive sheds at Grimesthorpe.
- The construction of a new marshalling yard at Tinsley (Tinsley Marshalling Yard) to replace many small yards around South Yorkshire.
- The construction of a Freightliner depot on the site of the former Masborough Sorting Sidings in Rotherham.
- The upgrading of signalling to multiple-aspect signalling or MAS.

== Details ==
=== Passenger services ===
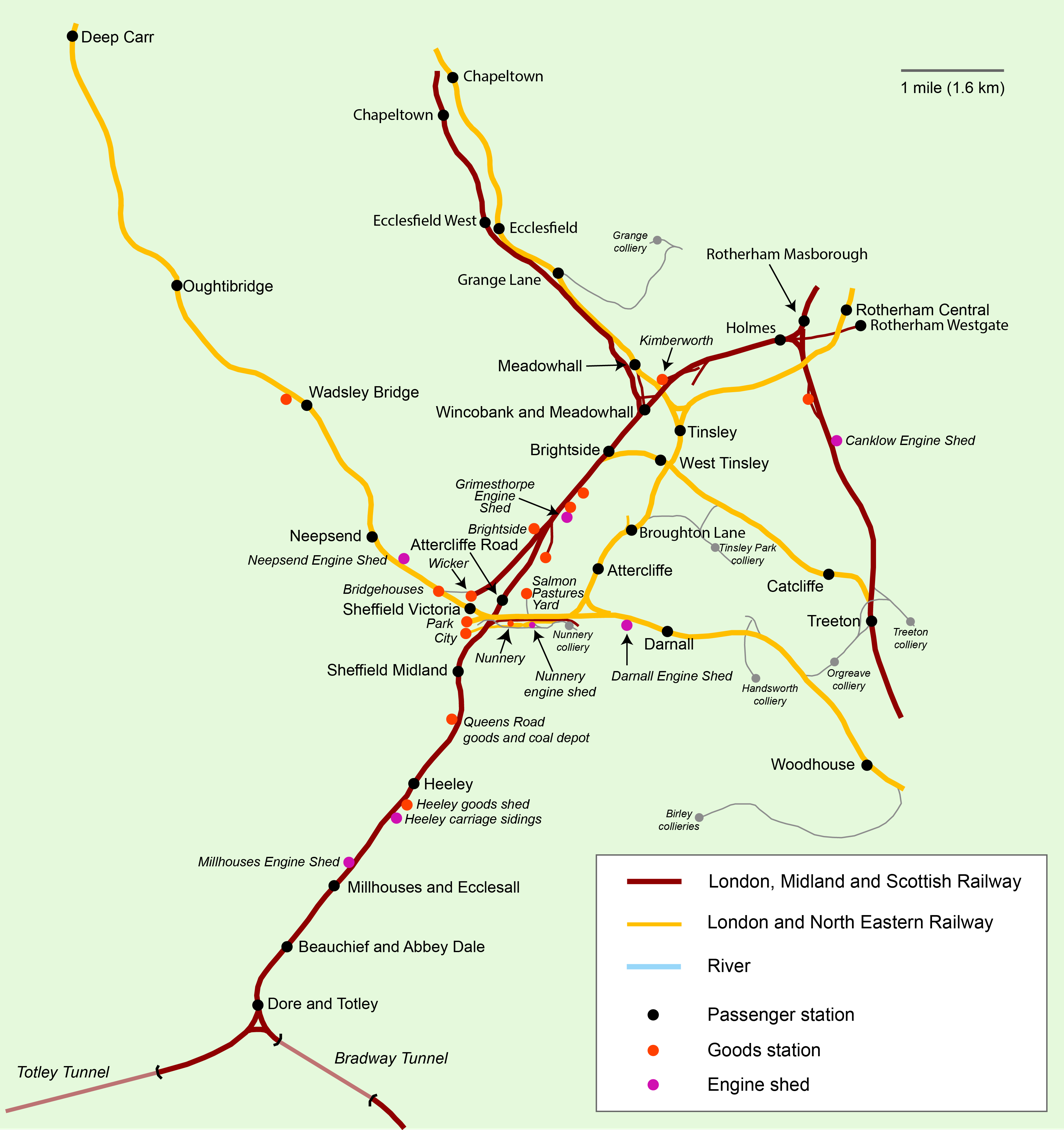
Railways in Sheffield in the 1930s

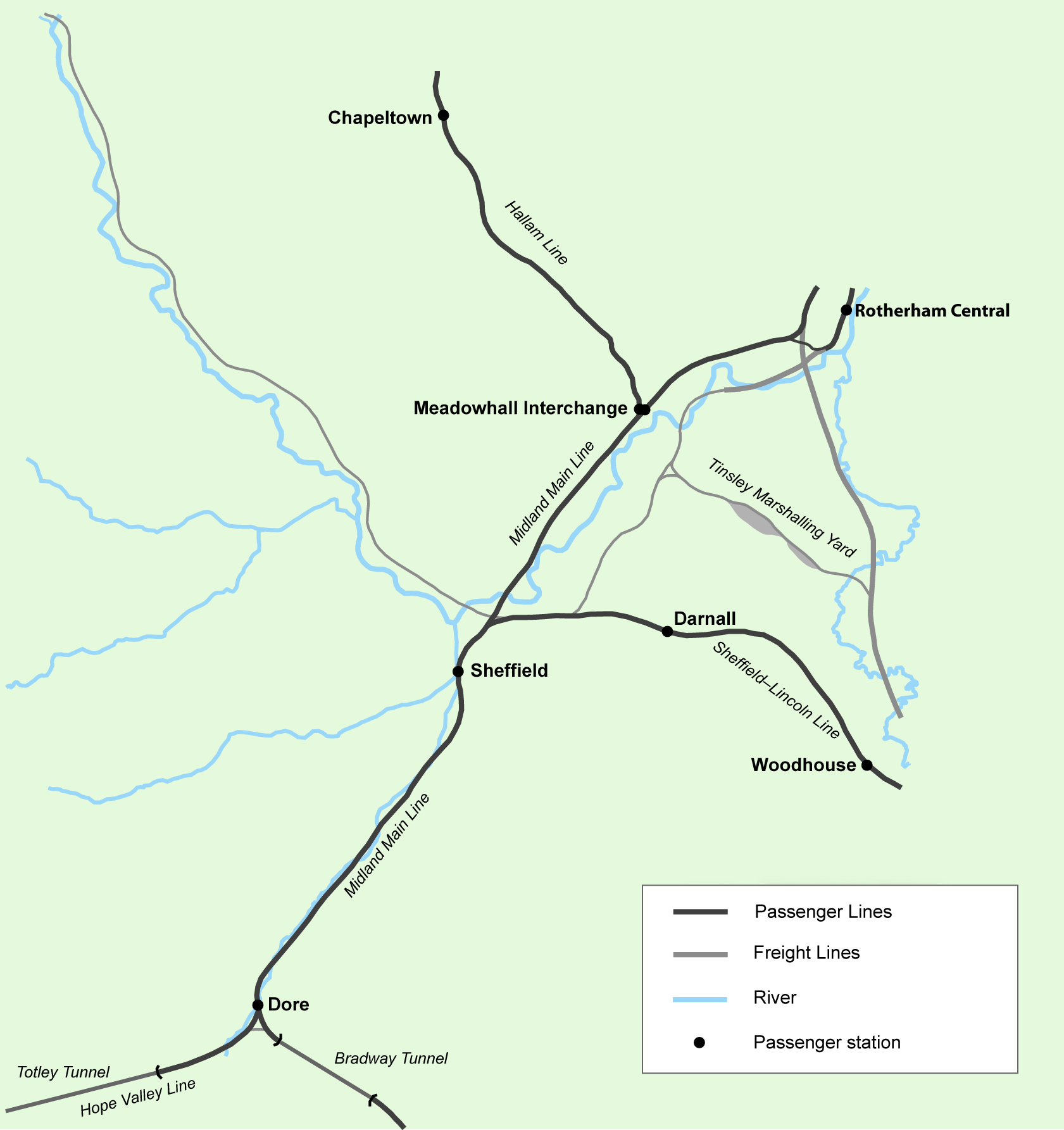
Railways in Sheffield in 2005.

In 1965, Sheffield Midland station's exterior was cleaned for the first time 95 years. At the same time, Sheaf House, new home of British Rail Sheffield Division headquarters were opened. Sheaf House stood on the site of the former Pond Street Goods station closed in 1963. Midland Main Line services South were improved with hourly workings (alternatively via Nottingham or Derby) from 1966 with departure times scheduled just past the hour. Cross-country passenger services from the North-East to the South-West were transformed with services running via Sheffield Victoria station rerouted to Sheffield Midland. Services via Retford and the ECML to London King's Cross were stopped and all London trains routed via the Midland Main Line to London St Pancras. The Master Cutler was transferred to the Midland line and lost its Pullman cars.

Stopping trains to Derby and Nottingham were taken off and Heeley, Millhouses and Beauchief stations were closed in June 1968. Stopping trains on the former Midland main line north of Rotherham were also axed in January 1968 and many South Yorkshire stations closed: all Leeds-bound stopping services were diverted to run via Chapeltown and Barnsley replacing the short distance Sheffield-Barnsley and Barnsley-Wakefield stopping trains on this line; York-bound services became semi-fast with Bolton-on-Dearne being the only South Yorkshire station north of Rotherham remaining open on that line.

The Nunnery Curve built in 1870 was upgraded and brought into passenger use, allowing trains arriving in Sheffield from the East over former Great Central lines to access Sheffield Midland. Passenger services to Lincoln, Doncaster, Hull, Grimsby and Cleethorpes were moved from Sheffield Victoria to Midland. It had been suggested that after the closure of Victoria the electrification be extended to Sheffield Midland from the Woodhead Line, but this was dismissed as being too expensive and the Woodhead became a freight only line under the 1984 Trunk Route Plan. All Manchester services were consequently diverted to the Hope Valley Line; electrified passenger services ended on 5 January 1970 and Sheffield Victoria station closed.

After closure the Sheffield to Huddersfield service continued to pass through Victoria by reversing at Woodburn Junction. This service was diverted via Barnsley in 1983 by an initiative of the SYPTE who agreed to subsidise the diversion (see Penistone line). The operation was a success and the diverted service was kept, resulting in subsequent station re-openings at Silkstone and Dodworth, which had both closed in 1959. Victoria station was demolished in 1989.

=== Freight traffic ===
Pond Street Goods station closed on 7 October 1961, Queens Road Goods station on 11 May 1963 and Park Goods station in October 1963. Work on Sheffield freight terminal at Grimesthorpe began at the end of 1963. A third Western entrance to Tinsley Yard over Shepcote Lane was opened in summer 1964 and was electrified. Followed the opening of Grimesthorpe in summer 1965. In order to allow goods trains reach the new Tinsley Marshalling Yard from the north a scissors junction, Aldwarke Junction, was constructed near Parkgate, North of Rotherham. This also enabled passenger trains to reach Sheffield Midland station from the Great Central route following the closure of the Swinton Curve. New lines were constructed from the Great Central in the Attercliffe/Broughton Lane area to reach the Sheffield District Railway and access to Tinsley Marshalling yard. Dr Beeching opened both complexes on 29 October.

=== Locomotive and train servicing ===
Between 1961 and 1965 the fleet of steam locomotives in the Sheffield area was gradually withdrawn and replaced with new diesel locomotives and multiple units. Millhouses engine shed was the first to close. Grimesthorpe lost its steam locomotives but became the temporary home to the new diesel locomotive fleet pending the opening of the new shed at Tinsley. This new depot, which could service both diesel and electric locomotives opened in February 1964. This resulted in the closure of Grimesthorpe and the steam/electric depot at Darnall, which became a wagon-repair depot and stabling point for Diesel Multiple Units. Barrow Hill and Canklow lost their allocation of steam locomotives in 1965; the former remained open up to February 1991 as a stabling point for diesel locomotives and the latter remained open for servicing visiting steam locomotives until the numbers of these dwindled in 1966 with withdrawals elsewhere.

All remaining servicing of passenger trains was done at Nunnery carriage sidings, or at Midland station itself in the through roads or on the former Pond Street goods depot.

=== Multiple-aspect signalling ===
The multiple-aspect signalling scheme, or MAS, was the two-stage introduction of multiple-aspect light signalling in the Sheffield area, which began in 1971. The scheme began with the reduction of the quadruple track between Sheffield Midland and Dore & Totley and the simplification of the up entrance to Sheffield Midland. The reduction in track was completed by January 1972 with the closure of Dore West and Dore South signal boxes. The dive under built in 1900 was taken out of use from 25 June 1972. There, the track was reduced from four to three and to two between Heeley and Dore & Totley. A passing loop was kept between Heeley and Millhouses.

Sheffield Power Box was commissioned between 20 and 22 January 1973. The new box replaced Sheffield station signal boxes A, B, North, South 1 and South 2, as well as Queens Road, Heeley station, Heeley carriage sidings and Millhouses. The end of stage I of the MAS scheme was announced in June.

Between 20 January and 22 January 1973 Sheffield Victoria station was temporarily reopened while Midland station was completely closed for commissioning of the new power box. Only the main up and down platforms were used as the loop platforms had already been lifted. The station was still complete but the electrics were deemed beyond help so the station was strung with light bulbs strung through the station roofing. Trains to Manchester went via Woodhead although diesel traction was used rather than electric working.

Stage II of the MAS was completed on 14 January 1979 when Wincobank signal box was closed. The boxes at Holmes, Masborough and Canklow closed in July 1979 followed on 16 May 1982 by Beighton Junction. Track work at Treeton was realigned and simplified and both boxes, Treeton Junction and Treeton South were closed in October 1982. At that point all Midland lines had been converted to MAS. The Sheffield to Lincoln line is however still operational using semaphore signals controlled by Woodhouse Junction signal box. The resignalling project was completed to encompass Chesterfield, Rotherham and lines north of Sheffield as far as Thurnscoe, Conisbrough, Darfield and Wath.

== The outcome today ==
As with much of the BR Modernisation Plan, a lot of expenditure was made in upgrading facilities to deal with wagonload freight and heavy industry traffic that would rapidly become obsolete. Tinsley Yard was never used to its full capacity, and although it remained impressively busy until the early 1980s it was almost defunct by the mid-1990s along with its locomotive depot. A major fire in 1985 proved convenient for the closure of the Grimesthorpe parcels/freight depot, which by that time was only being used for limited steel industry-related activity; the Freightliner depot between Masborough and Canklow was found to be more useful for steel loading than containers. The Darnall wagon-repair depot closed in the mid-1980s with the run-down of freight in the area. Nunnery carriage sidings also closed in the mid-1980s with the introduction of High Speed Trains on the Midland Main Line, which required less servicing, all of which was done from Leeds Neville Hill. After that time all remaining passenger train stabling and servicing was done at Midland station or outside the area; this was becoming increasingly problematic in the early 21st century leading to plans to re-open a Traincare Depot in the Sheffield area.

The decision to concentrate Rotherham's traffic on Masborough station was a mistake, which lead to declining passenger numbers. This was rectified in 1987 with the switching of Rotherham's passenger traffic to a brand new Central station on the site of its predecessor and, later, the closure of Masborough, albeit via a low-cost single line connection that is now seen to be a bottleneck.

A general increase in passenger numbers in the area since the 1980s has shown that, with hindsight, many of the suburban and urban station closures were premature. The stations at Meadowhall (on the site of the former Wincobank station) and Swinton, closed in the 1960s, were re-opened in 1990. Millhouses has been repeatedly put forward as a candidate for re-opening, with line capacity constraints usually cited as a confounding factor; indeed it is notable that the rationalised track layout to the south of Sheffield Midland that was enabled by the closure of the southern suburban stations is now cited as a major bottleneck. The re-opening of stations at Ecclesfield, Parkgate and Wath-upon-Dearne has also been mooted.
