= Sheffield Tramway =

Former tramway system in Sheffield, England

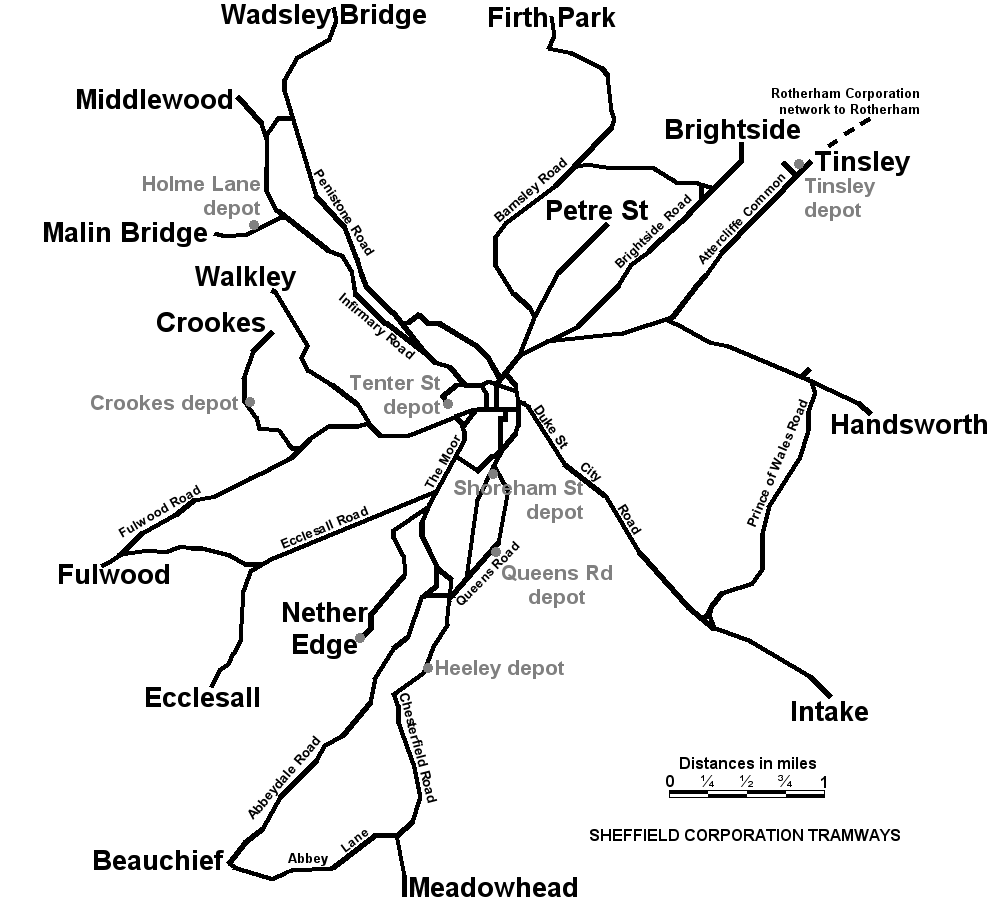
The Sheffield Corporation tramway network at its fullest extent, circa 1933. The lines to Nether Edge and Petre Street closed before the Second World War.

Sheffield Tramway was an extensive tramway network serving the English city of Sheffield and its suburbs.

The first tramway line, horse-drawn, opened in 1873 between Lady's Bridge and Attercliffe, subsequently extended to Brightside and Tinsley. Routes were built to Heeley, where a tram depot was built, Nether Edge and Hillsborough. In 1899, the first electric tram ran between Nether Edge and Tinsley, and by 1902 all the routes were electrified. As of 1910 the network covered 39 miles (62.7 km) and as of 1951 48 miles (77.2 km).

The last trams ran between Leopold Street to Beauchief and Tinsley on 8 October 1960—three Sheffield trams were subsequently preserved at the National Tramway Museum in Crich. 34 years later trams returned to the streets of Sheffield under a new network called Supertram.

== History ==
=== Horse tram era ===
Sheffield Tramways Act 1872
- Act of Parliament
- Parliament of the United Kingdom
- Long title: An Act to authorise the construction of Tramways in the Borough and Parish of Sheffield in the West Riding of the County of York; and for other purposes.
- Citation: 35 & 36 Vict. c. cxliii

Dates
- Royal assent: 25 July 1872
Other legislation
Repealed by	Sheffield Corporation (Consolidation) Act 1918

Status: Repealed

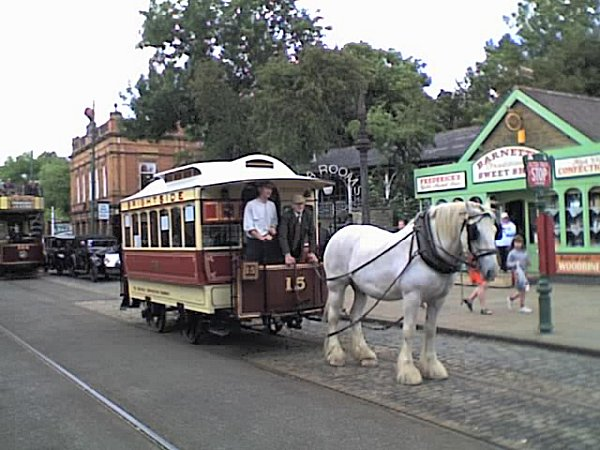
Sheffield tramcar 15, used on the Brightside route, at the National Tramway Museum

The Sheffield horse tramway was created under the Tramways Act 1870 (33 & 34 Vict. c. 78), with powers granted by the Sheffield Tramways Act 1872 (35 & 36 Vict. c. cxliii) in July 1872. The first routes, to Attercliffe and Carbrook, Brightside, Heeley, Nether Edge and Owlerton opened between 1873 and 1877. Under the legislation at that time, local authorities were precluded from operating tramways but were empowered to construct them and lease the lines to an individual operating company. Tracks were constructed by contractors and leased to the Sheffield Tramways Company, which operated the services.

Prior to the inauguration of the horse trams, horse buses had provided a limited public service, but road surfaces were poor and their carrying capacity was low. The new horse trams gave a smoother ride. The fares were too high for the average worker so the horse trams saw little patronage; services began later than when workers began their day so were of little use to most. Running costs were high as the operator had to keep a large number of horses and could not offer low fares.

=== Electric tram era ===
Sheffield Tramways Act 1896
- Act of Parliament
- Parliament of the United Kingdom
- Long title: An Act to extend the Agreement scheduled to the Sheffield Tramways Act 1872 and to authorise the winding up voluntarily of the Sheffield Tramways Company.
- Citation: 59 & 60 Vict. c. liii

Dates
- Royal assent: 2 July 1896
Other legislation
Amends	Sheffield Tramways Act 1872
Repealed by	Sheffield Corporation (Consolidation) Act 1918

Status: Repealed

Text of statute as originally enacted

Sheffield Corporation Tramways Act 1896
- Act of Parliament
- Parliament of the United Kingdom
- Long title: An Act to empower the Mayor Aldermen and Citizens of the City of Sheffield to work and use their Sheffield Tramways Undertaking.
- Citation: 59 & 60 Vict. c. cxxxvi

Dates
- Royal assent: 20 July 1896
Other legislation
Repealed by	Sheffield Corporation (Consolidation) Act 1918

Status: Repealed

Text of statute as originally enacted

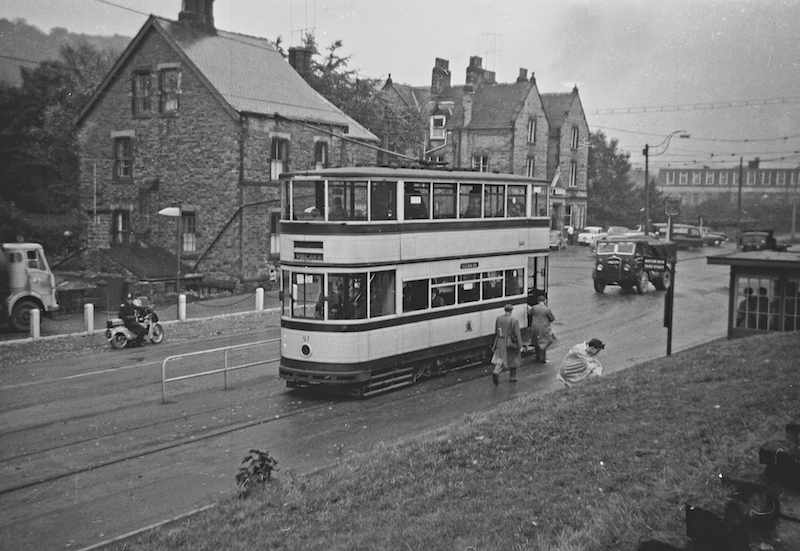
'Standard' tramcar 97 at Beauchief on the last day of the tramway, 1960. This is the junction with Abbey Lane, where it would turn left to loop back to City via Woodseats.

Sheffield Corporation (Sheffield City Council) took over the tramway system in July 1896 under the Sheffield Tramways Act 1896 (59 & 60 Vict. c. liii) and the Sheffield Corporation Tramways Act 1896 (59 & 60 Vict. c. cxxxvi). The corporation's goal was to expand and mechanise the system. Almost immediately a committee was formed to inspect other tramway systems to look at the improved systems of traction. Upon their return the committee recommended the adoption of electrical propulsion using the overhead current collection system.

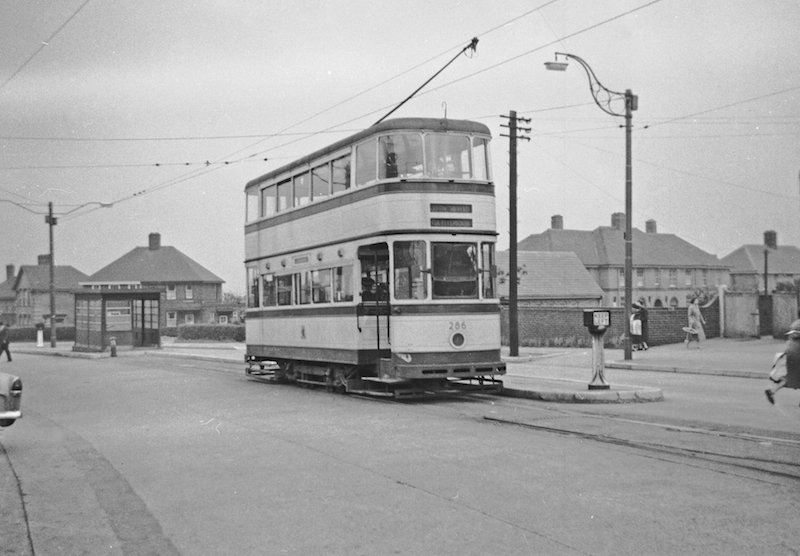
'Improved Standard' tramcar 286 at Sheffield Lane Top terminus, 1959

The National Grid had not been developed at that time, and so the corporation set out to generate the required current - the corporation became the local domestic and industrial electricity supplier. A power station was built for Sheffield Corporation Tramways on Kelham Island by the river Don between Mowbray Street and Alma Street. Feeder cables stretched from there to the extremities of the system, covering over 40 miles of route.

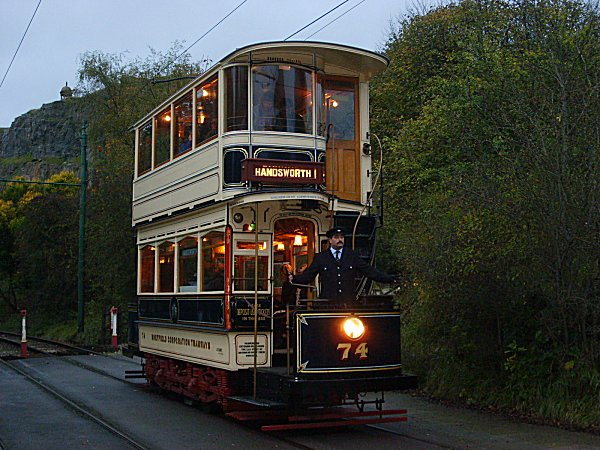
Preserved Sheffield tramcar 74, built 1900 as an open-top car and modified in 1909 to have a short top cover, as seen here, providing passengers protection from the elements

The horse operated lines were left opened and track replaced with heavier rails. Along with lines opening to Abbeydale, Walkley and Hunter's Bar, the missing link in the centre of the sprawling network between Moorhead and Lady's Bridge was finally laid.

Electric lines opened in succession; Nether Edge to Tinsley on 6 September 1899, to Walkley on 18 September 1899 and Pitsmoor on 27 September 1899. The other electric lines opened soon after allowing the Hillsborough to be closed in November 1902.

The network was basically in place by 1905, further development included extending lines out of the city and connecting lines.

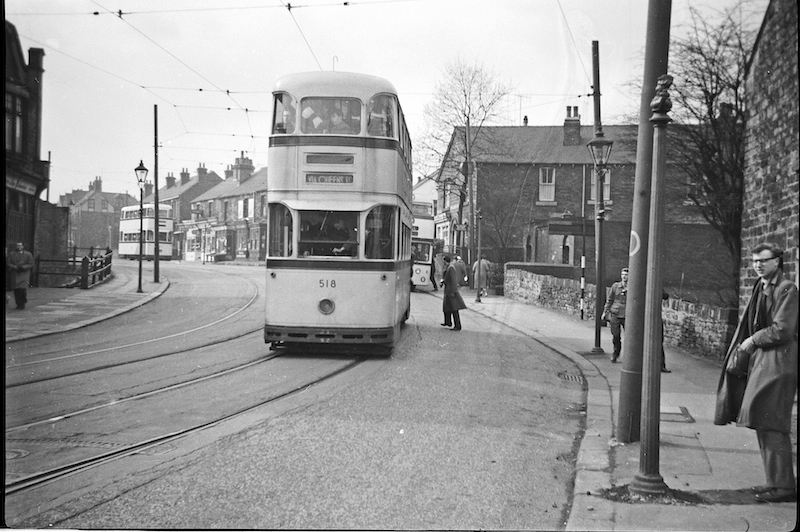
'Roberts' tramcar 518 on a special at Woodseats, March 1960. This photo is taken on Abbey Lane near the junction with Chesterfield Road.

In 1905, Rotherham Corporation connected their line to Templeborough to Tinsley and both Sheffield and Rotherham corporations began running services between both towns. Some tensions existed between both councils and services were halted between September 1914 and May 1915 leaving passengers to either walk between both networks or use the railways. Sheffield Corporation introduced motor bus services from the termini to outlying districts in 1918.

The First World War made material scarce and progress in bus technology which meant that many cities abandoned their tram networks. Sheffield considered trolleybuses, but found no favours in the council, who preferred motor buses. Twenty second-hand double-deck tramcars were purchased from London County Council Tramways in 1917 and 1918, due to the material shortage. This was a rare move but a necessary one to replace single-deck cars. The scarcity of material did not deter the corporation, though, who extended the network to Handsworth, Mansfield Road and to Sheffield Lane Top. In 1927, the Beauchief and Meadowhead lines were joined by the laying of track along Abbey Lane. Prince of Wales Road line was linked to the Handsworth and Intake line. The Nether Edge line was closed in 1934, in face of line renewal costs, the Nether Green via Broomhill line suffering the same fate.

The Prussian blue with cream bands with gold leaf lining livery gave way to the Cream with azure blue bands.

After the Second World War, the railway bridge on Sheffield Road was replaced and the through-tram service to Rotherham temporarily suspended. It was never reinstated. In 1951, the decision was taken to eventually close the tramway system and replace it with motor buses. The decision was not unanimous, Councillor R. W. Allott resigned from the ruling Labour Group in protest. The council compared the price to replace tramcars with that of buses, ignoring the shorter lifespan of motor buses.

The first line conversion was the Fulwood to Malin Bridge in 1952. Several protests broke out following the publishing of the news. "Sheffield folk were fond of their trams and did not take kindly to the prospect of losing them". An unsuccessful petition was handed over to the council by the Holme Lane residents and traders. The second conversion occurred in 1954 and was the Ecclesall to Middlewood line. Thos. W. Ward received most of the trams for scrapping via a track connection into their scrap-yard on Attercliffe Common, almost opposite the end of Weedon Street.

The last route, Beauchief to Vulcan Road, closed on the afternoon of Saturday 8 October 1960. An illuminated car, followed by a procession of fourteen trams, carried passengers and council dignitaries from Beauchief to the Tinsley depot. Trams then went on to Tinsley or Queens Road, trams led to the Queens Road depot were destined for preservation.

== Network ==
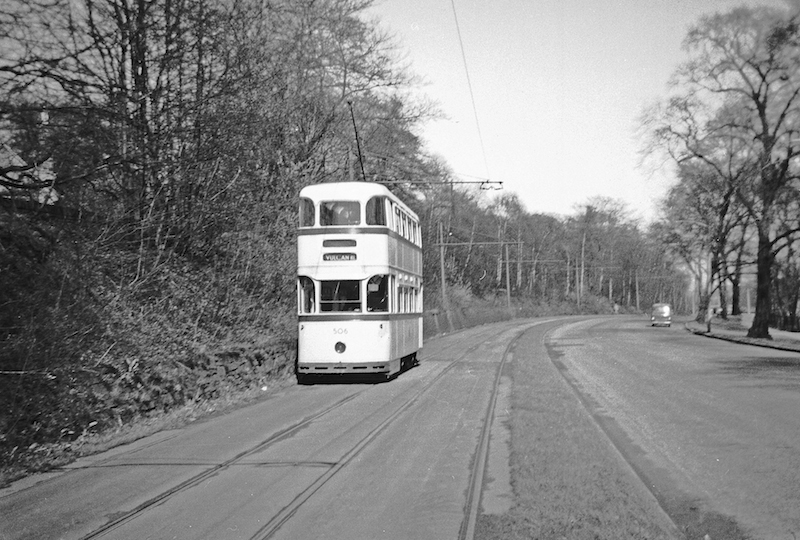
'Roberts' tramcar 506 on the Abbeydale Road reservation near Beauchief, 1960. This photo was taken on Abbeydale Road South heading towards the City Centre, Millhouses Park can just be seen on the right.

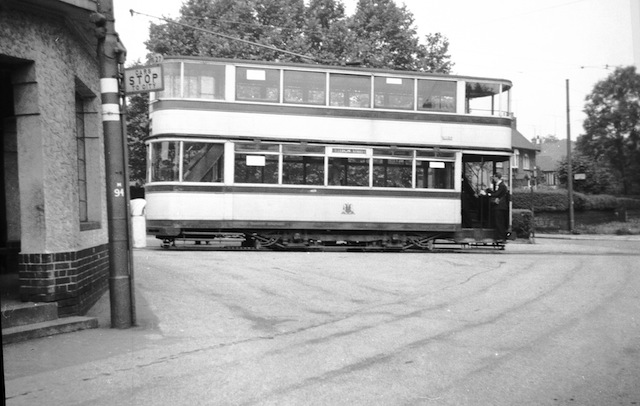
'Standard' tram at Millhouses loop, 1958

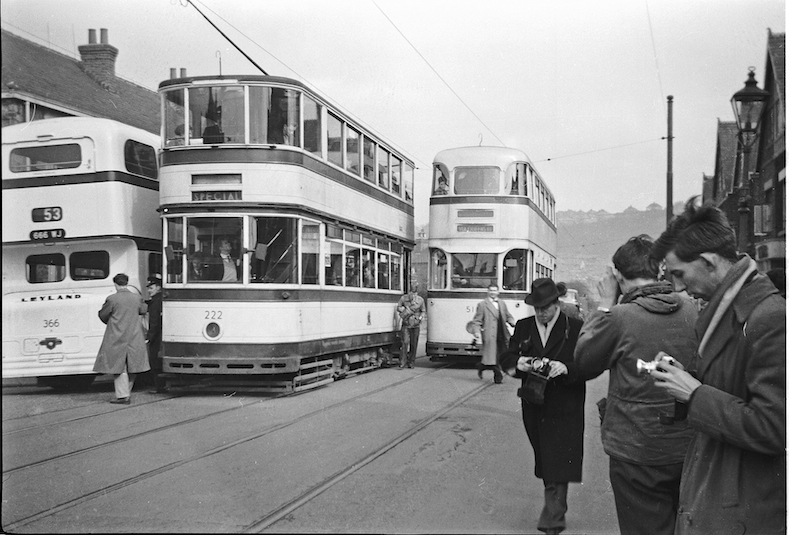
'Standard' tramcar 222 and an unknown 'Roberts' tramcar on a tour at Wolseley Road, March 1960. The No. 53 bus operating between Parson Cross and Beauchief was introduced to replace the Wadsley Bridge - Woodseats tram.

The Sheffield Tramway Company's original horse-drawn tram network was 9 1/2 miles long and radiated from the city centre to Tinsley, Brightside, Hillsborough, Nether Edge and Heeley. A few years after Sheffield Corporation took over horse tramways were gradually replaced first by single-deck, then double-deck electric trams. It extended routes to Beauchief and Woodseats in 1927 and to Darnall and Intake in 1928.

Adjacent lines were converted into circular route by sleeper-track connecting links. The line along Abbey Lane linking Beauchief to Woodseats was mostly reserved track.

The last extensions were opened in 1934 and extended the network to Lane Top, via Firth Park. Three small sections, Fulwood Road, Nether Edge and Petre St, were closed between 1925 and 1936.

In 1952 the corporation closed two sections followed by the rest of the network between 1954 and 1960. The sortable table below shows opening and closing dates of routes -

Terminus	Route	Date opened to electric trams	Date closed
Abbey Lane		14 April 1927	1 March 1959
Brightside		27 December 1901 (Note: via Newhall Road)	7 December 1958
Crookes	Old Grindstone	1 April 1901	5 May 1957
	School Road	28 April 1902	
	Heavygate Road	1913	
Darnall	Prince of Wales Road	11 April 1901	13 April 1958
Ecclesall	Hunters Bar	13 April 1900	28 March 1954
	Banner Cross	1908	
	Millhouses Lane	1922	1954
Firth Park	Pitsmoor	27 September 1899	3 April 1960
	Barnsley Road	1909	
Firth Park	Pitsmoor	26 October 1903	1 March 1959
	Brightside Lane	1909	
Firth Park	Newhall Road		27 October 1957
Fulwood	Ranmoor P.O.	1 August 1901	23 August 1936
via Broomhill	Nether Green	12 October 1901	
	Canterbury Avenue	12 July 1923	
Fulwood	Hangingwater Road	28 October 1901	6 January 1952
via Hunters Bar	Nether Green	14 May 1904	
	Canterbury Avenue	12 July 1923	
Handsworth	Norfolk Arms	1909	5 May 1957
	Orgreave Lane	7 September 1934	
Intake	Cemetery Gates	10 January 1900	8 April 1956
	Woodhouse Road	17 April 1902	(Manor Top-Intake)
	Hollinsend	8 February 1935	7 October 1956
	Birley Vale	29 December 1935	
Malin Bridge		1909	6 January 1952
Meadowhead		12 July 1928	3 April 1960
Middlewood	Hillsborough	30 May 1903	28 March 1954
	Middlewood	1913	
Millhouses	Firth Road	28 July 1900	
	Bannerdale Road	1 March 1901	
	Millhouses Lane	17 April 1902	
	Waggon & Horses	31 July 1926	
Nether Edge		5 September 1899	25 March 1934
Prince of Wales Road		24 February 1928	13 April 1958
Rotherham		11 September 1905	12 December 1948
Sheffield Lane Top		18 November 1934	see Firth Park
Tinsley		5 September 1899	
Wadsley Bridge	Owlerton	26 January 1901 (Note: Owlerton via Penistone Road opened 12 February 1902)	4 October 1959
via Nursery Street	Halifax Road	7 June 1924	
Walkley		18 September 1899	8 April 1956
Woodseats	Thirlwell Road	1 November 1900	
	Woodbank Cres	1 November 1902 (Note: via the Moor; Shoreham Street and Queens Road opened 1904)	4 October 1959 (Note: via Shoreham Street and Queens Road)
	Chantrey Road	6 April 1903	3 April 1960 (Note: via the Moor)
	Abbey Lane	1923	

== Tram depots ==
Eight depots were built throughout the city to service a fleet of about 400 trams.

=== Tinsley depot ===
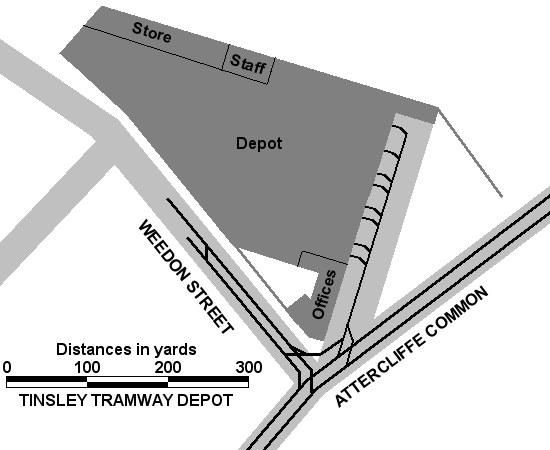
Plan of Tinsley Depot

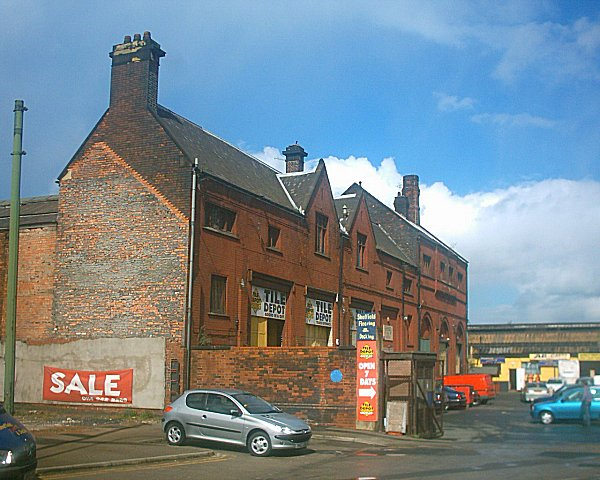
Tinsley Depot in 2006

Tinsley depot (53°24′28″N 1°24′45″W) was built in 1874 and was the first depot built for the "Sheffield Tramways Company". It was originally built for horse trams but was converted for electric trams in 1898–99, after which it was capable of accommodating 95 trams. Following the abandonment of the tramway system in 1960, it was sold and was subsequently used as a warehouse. Much of the original 1874 building still exists and the entire depot is listed as a historically significant building. The Sheffield Bus Museum Trust used part of the depot as the Sheffield Bus Museum from 1987 until 2007, when it moved to a factory unit at Aldwarke, Rotherham. Since then the Sheffield Bus Museum Trust has been renamed the South Yorkshire Transport Museum.

The building was then all but empty, with just a tile dealer left, in the first two bays through the gate.

In 2009, the building was once again fully occupied. The rest of the bays are now home to the South Yorkshire Transport Trust's 75 vehicle collection - http://www.sytt.webeden.co.uk/ The SYTT announced plans in February 2010 that looks set to see Tinsley Depot restored and opened as a new Museum.

=== Heeley depot ===
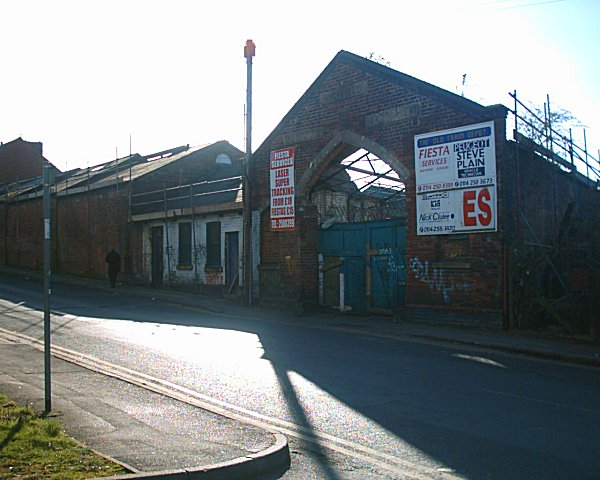
Heeley depot in 2006, now Grade II listed

Heeley depot (53°21′31.5″N 1°28′28″W) was for horse trams only: the line to it was never electrified. The depot was built by the Sheffield Tramways company in 1878.

When the building was no longer required it was sold off and used as a motor vehicle repair shop until 2005, when it was purchased to become part of a block of flats. The building had listed status, as part of which the builder was told that the archway, which included the carved stone "Sheffield Tramways" legend, had to remain in place. Although promises were made by the builder to that effect, locals woke one morning to find it knocked down. The builder told the council that it was unsafe and fell down in the night. Sheffield City Council instructed the builder that all work on site must stop until the archway was restored; however, work continued regardless. Flats were built in place of the depot and the central rooftop removed to make way for a courtyard. The original archway was finally rebuilt, partly with original material but noticeably different and with a lot of new material. Slate from the original roof was replaced. The arch looks 'new' and some locals have said it has lost its originality. It is far higher that it was before as it has been lifted to comply with regulations to allow access by the fire service.

=== Nether Edge depot ===
A small tram shed was built at the Nether Edge terminus (53°21′35″N 1°29′18″W), opened in 1899. The Nether Edge line and two other small sections were abandoned due to the narrowness of the streets, which caused problems and were unsuitable for efficient service.

=== Queens Road works ===
Queens Road works (53°22′8″N 1°27′52″W) opened in 1905. Many of Sheffield trams were built here. The building survived for many years following abandonment, but was demolished in 1993.

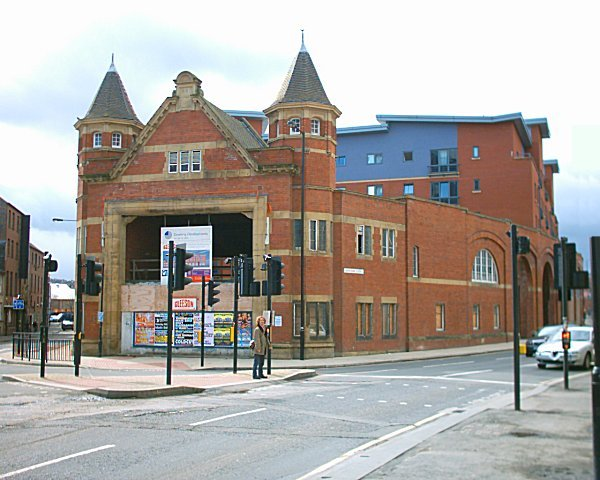
Shoreham Street Depot in 2006

=== Shoreham Street depot ===
Construction of Shoreham Street depot (53°22′36″N 1°27′54″W) started in about 1910 on the site of an 18th-century lead mill. Following the abandonment of the tramway the depot was used as a bus garage until the 1990s. Much of the building has since been demolished and redeveloped as student flats. Those parts that surround the entrance at the junction of Shoreham Street and Leadmill Road are still standing and in good condition, though a new use for them has yet to be found.

=== Crookes depot ===
Crookes depot, which was on Pickmere Road (53°23′1″N 1°30′25″W), was started in 1914 but not completed until 1919. It closed on 5 May 1957 and has since been demolished and a church now stands on the site.

=== Tenter Street depot ===
Tenter Street depot (53°23′2″N 1°28′21″W) opened in 1928 and was the last operational tram depot. There was a bus garage on the upper level, accessed from Hawley Street.

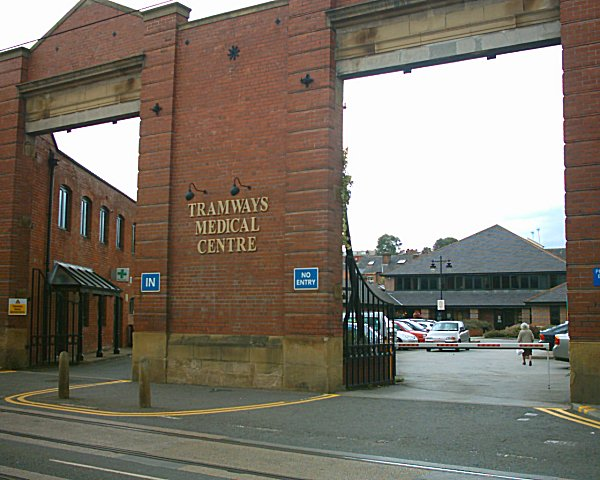
Hillsborough tram depot in 2004

=== Holme Lane depot (Hillsborough) ===
The depot at Holme Lane (53°24′7″N 1°30′12″W) closed on 23 April 1954. The facade of the building still stands, although the rest of the building has been demolished and a medical centre built in its place.

== Rolling stock ==
Unlike other tram companies, whose trams were often rebuilt and made to last 30 to 40 years, Sheffield Corporation adopted a policy of replacement by new vehicles after a 25-year life. By 1940, only 11 of its 444 trams were older than 26 years, more than half of them were less than ten.

Sheffield Corporation operated 884 trams. Its last livery was blue and cream, worn on the preserved trams at Crich and Beamish.

=== The 'Preston' cars ===
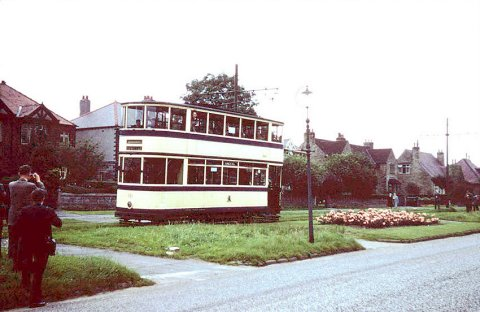
'Standard' Tramcar 123 on Abbey Lane, Beauchief. Taken approximately 3/4 of the way Eastward between Folds Lane and Folds Crescent.

The United Electric Car Company of Preston built 15 double deck balcony cars for Sheffield Corporation Tramways in 1907. Initially numbered 258–272 they had wooden seats for 59 passengers, and were mounted on a four-wheel Peckham P22 truck with two Metrovick 102DR 60 hp motors operated by British Thomson-Houston B510 controllers. The braking systems consisted of a handbrake acting on all wheels, an electric brake for emergency use and a hand-wheel operated track brake. Between December 1924 and July 1927 they were rebuilt with a totally enclosed upper deck.

=== The 'Rocker Panel' cars ===
Following the production of a prototype at Queens Road works in 1918, between 1919 and 1927 Brush at Loughborough built 100 of these cars, and another 50 at Cravens in Darnall.

=== The 'Standard' cars ===
The prototype Standard car (number 1) was built by Cravens at Darnall, and entered service in 1927. Subsequently, about 150 were built at Queens Road works and 25 by W.E. Hill & Sons in South Shields. From 1936 to 1939 Queens Road works built redesigned Standard cars, known as the 'Domed-roof' class, which had improved lighting and seats.

=== The 'Roberts' cars ===
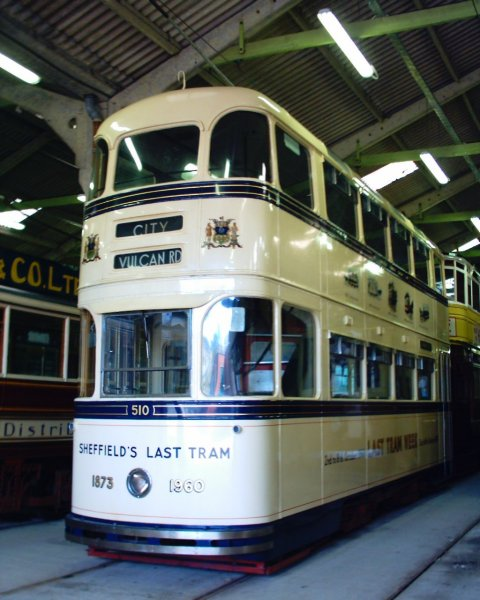
Preserved 'Roberts' Tramcar 510 at Crich Tramway Museum. Built in 1950 as part of a 35-strong fleet to replenish the depleted fleet of trams post-war.

The prototype for this series, number 501, was built at Queens Road works in August 1946. With comfortable upholstered seating for 62 passengers, it was the last car to be built at the works. From 1950 to 1952 35 more, numbered 502–536, were constructed by Charles Roberts & Co. of Horbury near Wakefield. They were carried on a four-wheel Maley & Taunton hornless type 588 truck with rubber and leaf spring suspension, powered by two Metrovick 101 DR3 65 hp motors. Air brakes were fitted, acting on all wheels, and electric braking was available for emergency use. Car 536, which entered service on 11 April 1952, was the last tram to be constructed for Sheffield. Representing the ultimate development of the traditional British four-wheel tram, the class worked for only 10 years, as Sheffield tramway closed in 1960. On 8 October of that year, car 513, ran specially decorated in the final procession; so too did sister tram 510, now preserved by the National Tramway Museum at Crich.

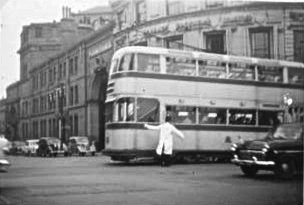
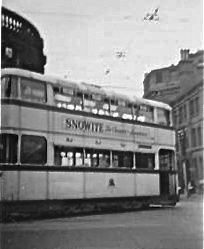

== Sheffield trams in preservation ==
=== The National Tramway Museum, Crich ===
The National Tramway Museum at Crich in Derbyshire holds eight Sheffield trams. Car 15 is a horse tram dating from 1874; it was the first tram to be used at the museum in 1963 and still remains serviceable. Car 74 is another Victorian Sheffield tram, sold to the Gateshead tramway and ran until 1951. Although only its lower deck survived, as a garden shed, it has been restored to original condition by the museum and is operational. The museum also has Standard car 189 (on display), Domed-roof car 264 (on display), and Roberts car 510 (operational). In addition there is also Sheffield works car 330 and early single-deck tram 46 that are not in working condition.

=== North of England Open Air Museum, Beamish ===
The North of England Open Air Museum at Beamish had two preserved Sheffield trams. Number 264 is a Preston car dating from 1907 and is in service after a major overhaul was completed in 2016, Number 513, a Roberts car dating from 1950, was initially privately preserved, arriving at Beamish and entering its collection in 1976. Restored to working order in 1983, including the provision of new control gear having lost its original equipment due to vandalism, it was loaned to Blackpool in 1984 for 14 months for their centenary celebrations, returned to Beamish and then back on loan to Blackpool in 2001. In 2011 it moved to the East Anglian Transport Museum and ownership of it has since transferred from Beamish to that organisation.

=== South Yorkshire Transport Museum ===
The SYTM owns Sheffield Corporation tramcar 460. The tramcar was built by Cravens in Darnall, Sheffield and was part of a batch of fifty cars, all numbered between 451 and 500. The car was equipped with upholstered seats in April 1939 and survived the Blitz on Sheffield in December 1940. She was withdrawn in February 1950 and stored at Tinsley Tram Sheds until 1951 when the car was dismantled with the lower and upper saloon bodies being disposed of separately. The lower saloon of No 460 fetched £25 and was used on a farm in Lincolnshire.

The lower body was generously donated by Mr and Mrs K.S. Jacklin of Susworth near Scunthorpe and returned to Tinsley in May 1987.

== Remnants ==
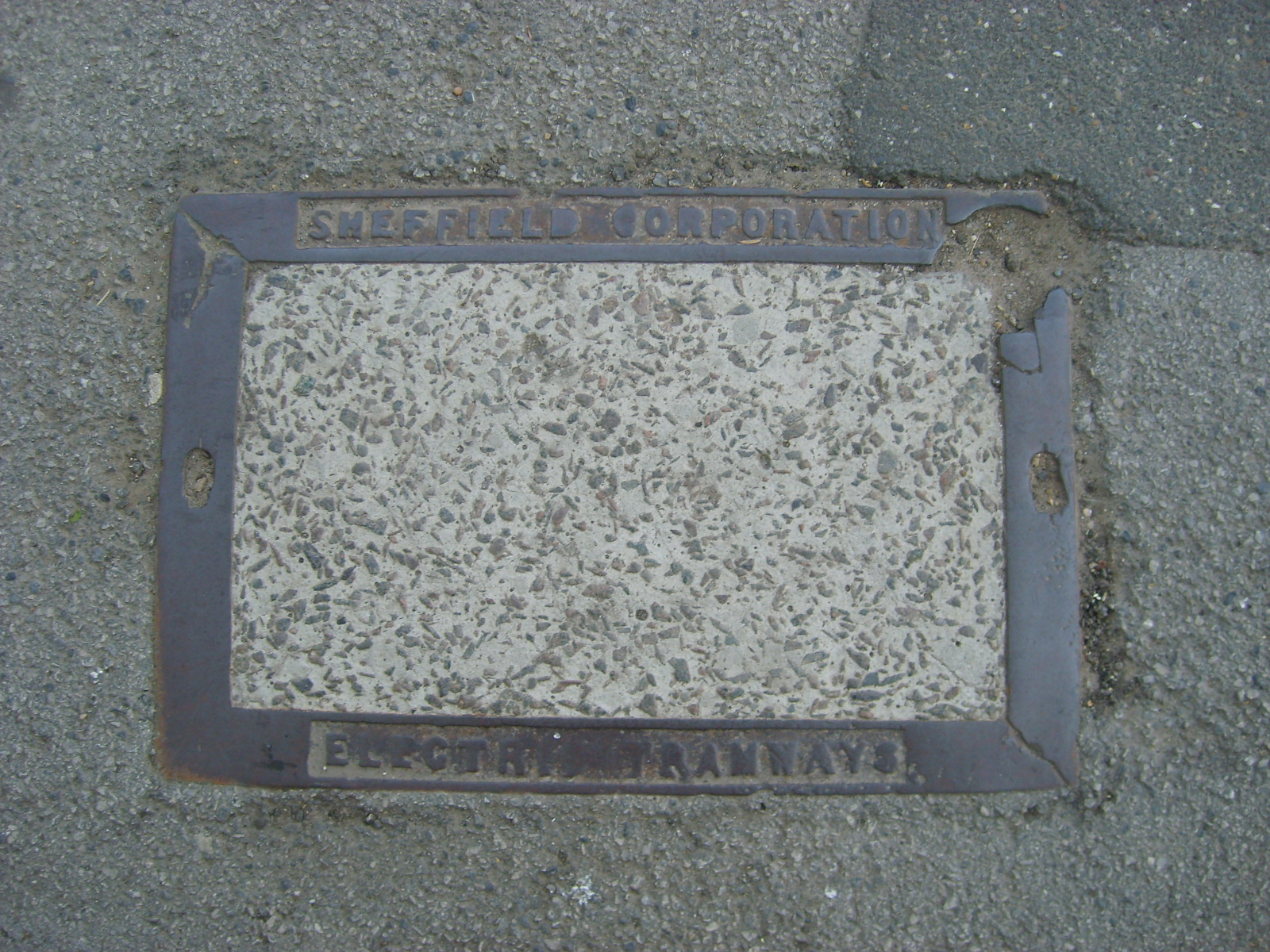
A grate at 497 Abbeydale Road bearing the markings of the Sheffield Corporation Electric Tramways

There are very few remnants of the once extensive tramway.

The tram shed at Tinsley survives more or less intact, as do parts of those at Holme Lane and Shoreham Street. Parts of Heeley shed remain but it has been stripped out and substantially altered, turning it in to an approximation of its former self.

In many places the tram tracks were not removed: the road was resurfaced over the tracks, which survive (albeit covered). An example of tracks covered in this way was uncovered and made a feature of The Moor pedestrian precinct for a time, but this was re-covered when the area was re-modelled a few years back.

At Firth Park, the short section of reserved track, running through the middle of a roundabout, still exists.

There were about ten traction poles still standing in 2006, such as the matching pair in Firth Park, and single poles at Manor Top, Woodseats, Abbeydale Road, Angel Street and also the last pole outside Tinsley Depot.

On the pavement of Howard Road in Walkley, near the junction with Commonside, several manhole covers marked "Sheffield Corporation Tramway" are still in place. A manhole survives on Abbeydale Road between the junction with Sheldon Road and Abbeydale Picture House with the inscription "Sheffield Corporation Electric Tramways".

In places where the trams ran on a reserved track, such as on Abbeydale Road South and Abbey Lane at Beauchief, the reservation has been converted into a dual carriageway. The former line lives on in the name of Terminus Road, Abbeydale.

At Kelham Island, the power station that generated the electricity for system still stands and is now the Kelham Island Museum.

Resurfacing projects across the city in 2019 have uncovered a large amount of old tram rails, which have since been removed.
