= Bradway Tunnel =

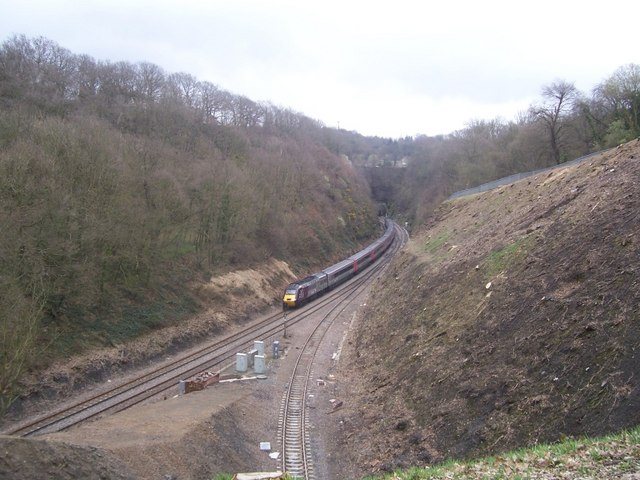
- Interactive map of Bradway Tunnel

Overview
- Line: Midland Main Line
- Location: Derbyshire / South Yorkshire border
- Coordinates: 53.3156°N 1.4943°W

Operation
- Constructed: brick
- Opened: 1870
- Owner: Network Rail

Technical
- Length: 1 mile 266 yards (1.853 km)
- Track gauge: 4 ft 8 1/2 in (1,435 mm)

Bradway Tunnel, 1 mile 266 yards (1.853 km) long, was built in 1870 about 1-mile (1.6 km) north of Dronfield, Derbyshire, in South Yorkshire, England.

It is at the summit of the Midland Main Line between Chesterfield and Sheffield, on what is known to railwaymen as the "New Road" built by the Midland Railway to serve Sheffield, which was bypassed by the North Midland Railway's "Old Road" due to the gradients involved. During its excavation a number of small heading tunnels were needed to drain some 16,000 gallons of water an hour.

At the north end is the triangular junction with the Hope Valley Line and Dore & Totley station. Northwards the line proceeds down a 1 in 110 gradient, through the abandoned Beauchief, Millhouses & Ecclesall and Heeley stations, into Sheffield station.

- North western portal: 53°19′19″N 1°30′35″W
- South eastern portal: 53°18′45.3″N 1°29′11.6″W

== See also ==
- List of tunnels in the United Kingdom
