= Tinsley Marshalling Yard =

Train yard

Coordinates: 53°23′55.1″N 1°22′51.2″W

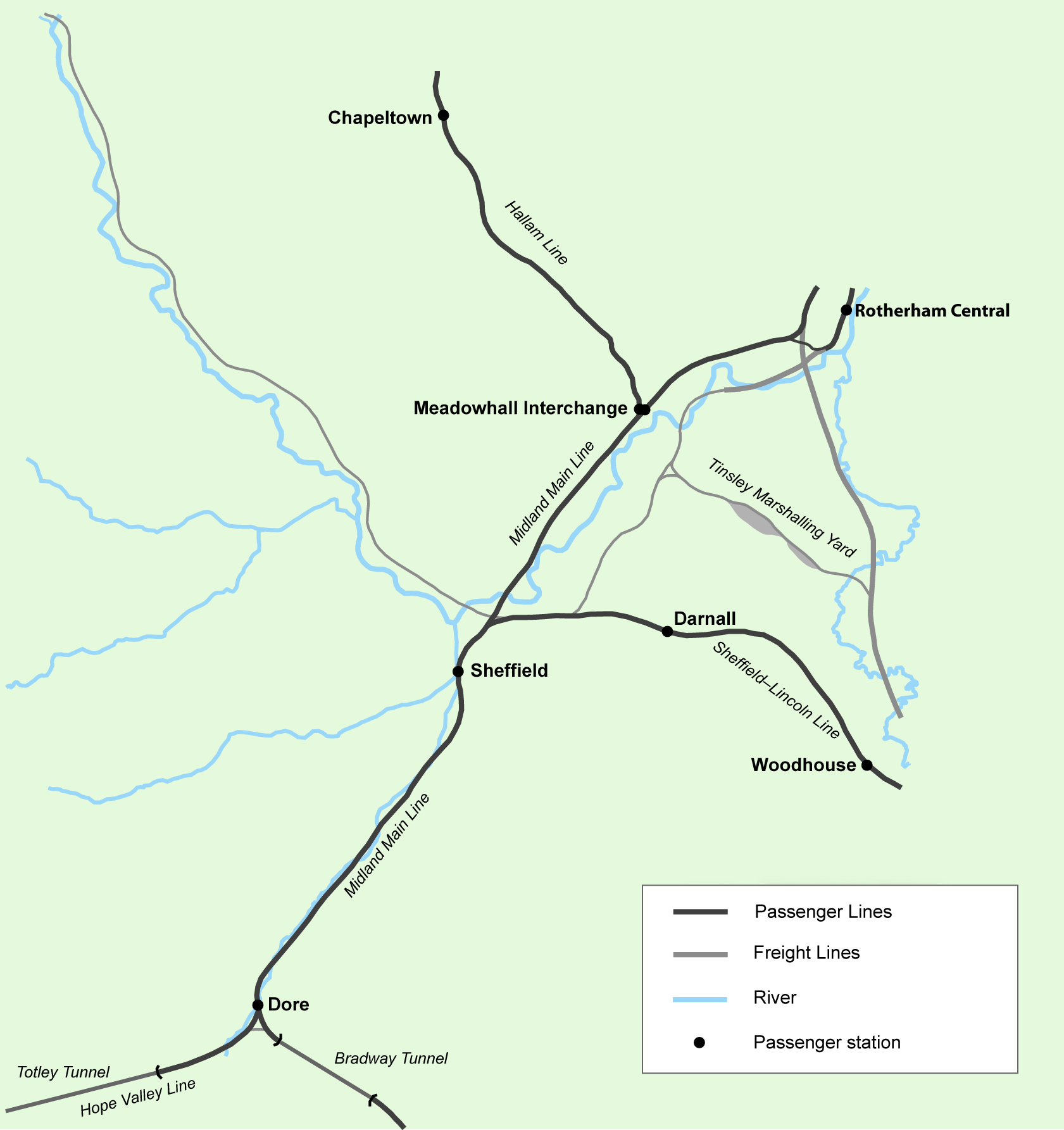
Tinsley Yard and the railways of Sheffield (2005)

Tinsley Marshalling Yard was a railway marshalling yard near Tinsley in Sheffield, England, used to separate railway wagons from incoming trains and add them to new trains. It was sited immediately west of the M1 motorway, about one mile north of the Catcliffe junction. It was opened in 1965, as a part of a major plan to rationalise all aspects of the rail services in the Sheffield area; it closed in stages from 1985, with the run-down of rail freight in Britain. It was also the site of Tinsley Traction Maintenance Depot (TMD), which was closed in 1998; at its peak, 200 locomotives were allocated to this depot.

As of 2011, an intermodal road-rail freight terminal Sheffield International Rail Freight Terminal (SIRFT) is located on part of the site; it was built c2008. A set of sidings is operated by DB Schenker Rail (UK) serving the nearby Outokumpu steel works.

== History ==
In 1961, a tenth of the rail-borne freight in Britain originated in the Sheffield district. However, as with many areas, the provision of freight facilities had grown through cramped, piecemeal developments associated with the various operating companies that built Britain's rail system. With the region being one of the main heavy industry heartlands of Britain, government money was made available to remedy this situation. Central economic planning and economic self-sufficiency were government policy; the situation was seen as a major limit on Britain's economic growth.

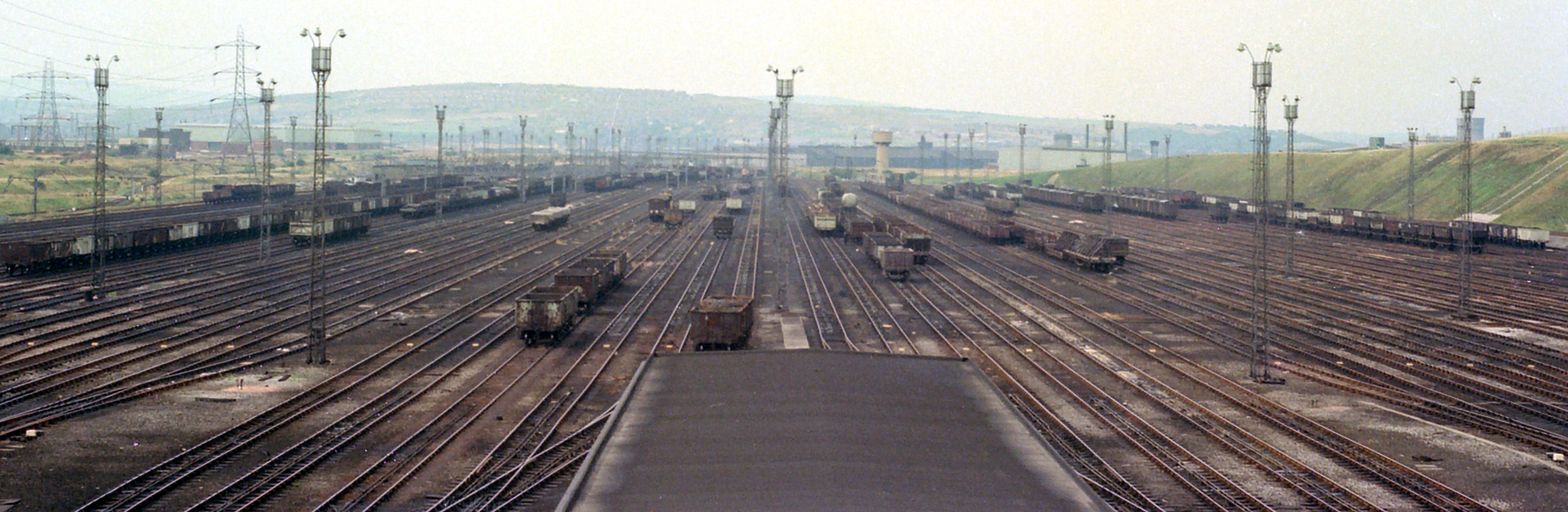
Tinsley yard in 1974.

The Sheffield district rail rationalisation plan of the 1960s called for the replacement of the majority of the marshalling yards in the Sheffield area with one large yard. A location on the Sheffield District line was chosen and work started in 1963 with new connections being built at Treeton, Broughton Lane and Tinsley South. The 80 yard Tinsley Wood Tunnel and approach cuttings were filled with some of the material excavated from the new yard, the remaining material being transported to a tip at Orgreave. The location allowed easy access to the brand new central Sheffield Freight Terminal at Grimesthorpe, and the new Freightliner terminal on the site of the Masborough Sorting Sidings in Rotherham, one of the many yards that Tinsley replaced.

The locomotive depot opened in 1964, with diesel locomotives moving in from a temporary home in the old Grimesthorpe steam locomotive depot and Darnall diesel (former electric locomotive) depot, Darnall steam locomotive depot being closed to become a wagon-repair depot. Other steam locomotive depots at Millhouses and Canklow were closed and the last steam locomotives based in the Sheffield area were scrapped, along with many redundant sidings dotted about the area.

The Tinsley complex was opened by Dr Richard Beeching, former Chairman of the British Railways Board, on 29 October 1965.

=== The yard ===
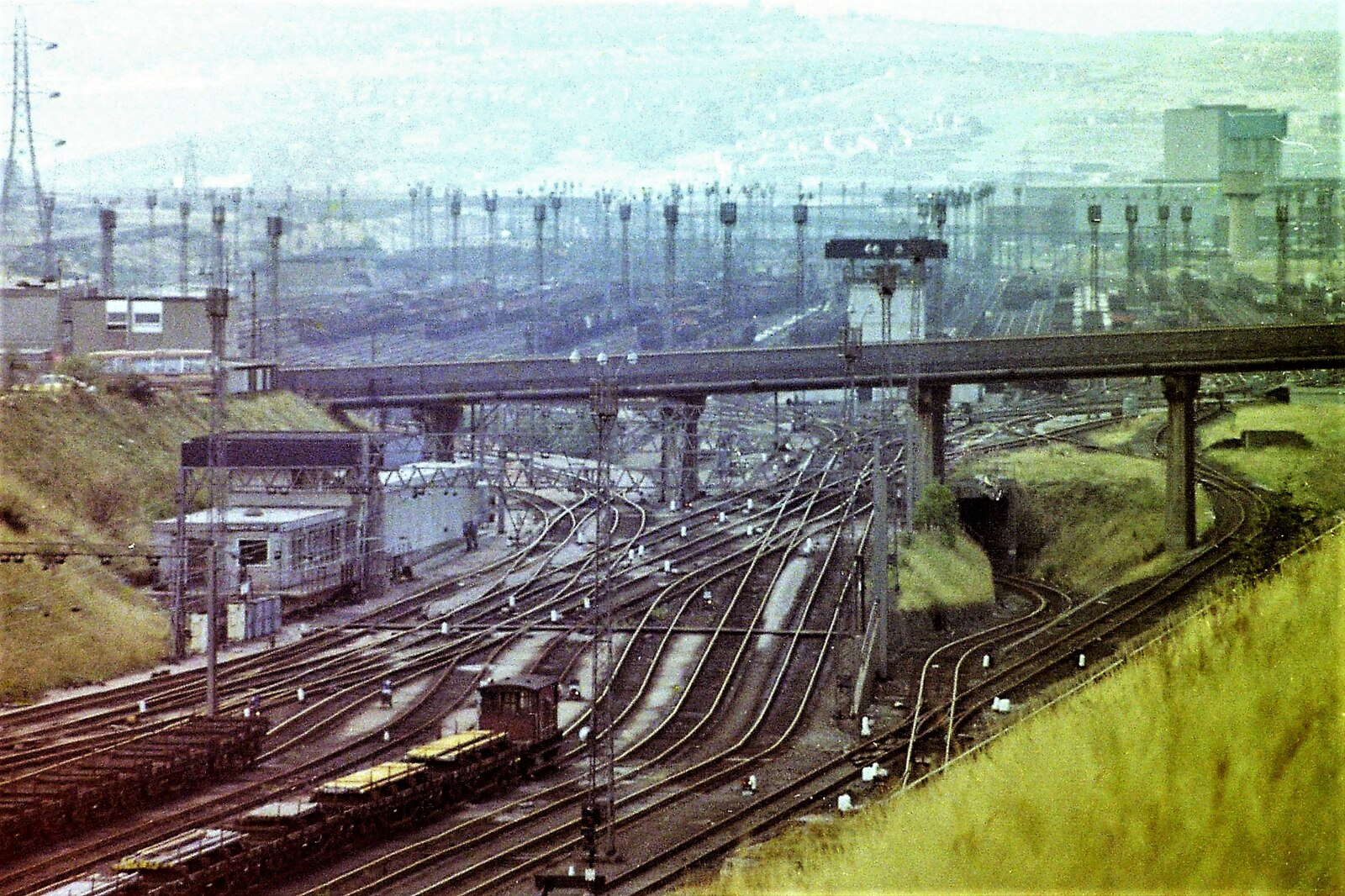
Tinsley Yard looking west (1981)

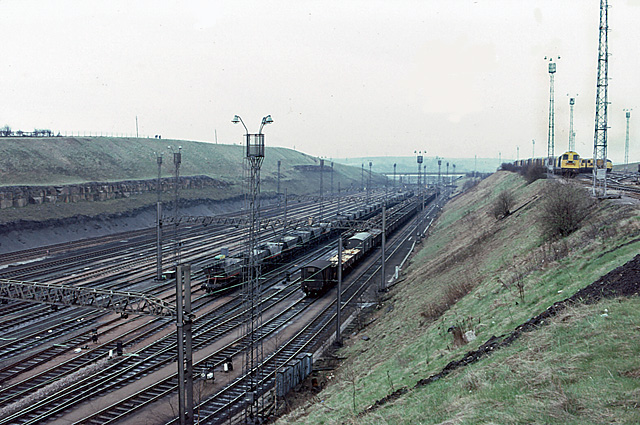
Tinsley Yard (1982)

From its outset, Tinsley was to be a "network yard": a major railfreight node where wagon-load freight trains would arrive, be split and sorted into new trains for onward departure to other network yards, directly to the many rail-connected businesses in the area in "trip" freights, or to the freight terminal for unloading and forwarding by road. To assist with this, it featured gravity-assisted shunting and a new computerised system of wagon control, along the lines of large US rail freight yards.

At the time of opening, the yard was handling 3,000 wagons a day. Incoming trains were split in the 11 reception sidings, propelled over the hump in the yard, from where the individual wagons rolled down a slope and were automatically sorted into new trains on the yard's 50 main sorting sidings. The yard had its own dedicated class of shunting locomotive (British Rail Class 13) for this purpose as BR's standard class of shunting locomotive was not powerful enough. Each of the main sorting sidings was fitted with computer-controlled retarders to either slow the rolling wagons down before they hit other wagons already on the siding, or give wagons rolling too slowly a boost to move them along to the correct position in a particular siding. This wagon-control system, manufactured by Dowty, was very complex, needed almost constant maintenance, and crucially could not handle the longer wheelbase wagons that were already becoming prevalent and required individual shunting. There was an express freight and departure yard of 10 sidings, and a 25-road secondary yard for local freight trains (with its own hump).

The Manchester-Sheffield-Wath electrification was extended into the yard in 1965 to allow electrically hauled trains to the Manchester area to be handled. Seventeen miles of track from Woodburn Junction and Darnall Junction via Broughton Lane to the Reception Sidings at Catcliffe were electrified at 1500 V DC. The insulators were capable of being used at 6.25 kV AC if ever required, with the option of 25 kV AC with minimal conversion costs. Unlike similar electrified marshalling yards, to save on costs the main body of the sorting sidings was not electrified: a half of the arrival sidings was electrified for incoming electric trains; departing electric trains either had to use the southern third of the main sorting sidings (the western part of which were wired for electric trains) or had to be drawn out of the main sorting sidings by diesel locomotives into electrified departure roads where the electric locomotives were attached.

=== Decline ===
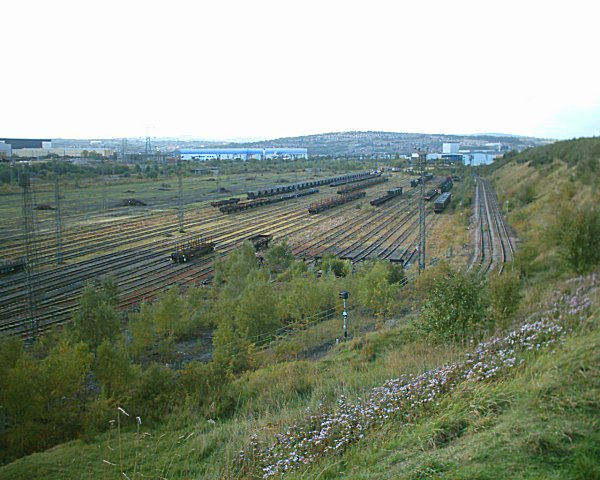
Tinsley Yard (2005)

From an early stage the yard was not used at capacity: by the late 1960s road competition was biting hard into the railways' goods traffic, and in particular the wagon-load freight that required hump-yards like Tinsley was already declining. The economic malaise and industrial decline of the 1970s exacerbated this. By the 1980s, British Rail was closing its remaining wagon-load freight facilities as being uneconomic.

In 1981, the electrification was removed with the closure of the Manchester-Sheffield-Wath system.

On 17 December 1984, the arrival sidings and hump were closed, the wagon-control system removed and the remaining Class 13s scrapped. The under-utilised Grimesthorpe Freight Terminal was severely damaged by a major fire on 14 December 1984 and was relegated to being a steel-loading facility. The yard connections were relaid to allow easier handling of block-load trains which now dominated rail freight in Britain.

By 1995, the decline in British heavy industry meant that this type of traffic had also declined massively, resulting in the closure of the locomotive depot on 27 March 1998. The eastern connections (both north- and south-facing chords) to the Midland 'Old Road' were closed in 1993 however the track is still in situ, and the western connection to the Midland Main Line (and goods depot at Grimesthorpe) at Brightside junction was lifted in 1999. Both chords to the ex MSLR/GCR line from Woodburn to Rotherham (via Broughton Lane junction and Tinsley South junction) remain open. The rest of the yard progressively fell into disuse over the next ten years.

A few years later only the main sorting sidings remained: a part of these were to be used to stable steel trains destined for the Sheffield area; the rest of the remaining sidings were used to store surplus-to-requirements rolling stock in a poor state of repair. However, in 2007 the remaining sidings were lifted and a new, much smaller yard laid, additionally a new rail-linked distribution and goods transshipment centre – Sheffield International Rail Freight Terminal (SIRFT) was constructed.

== Post hump yard, 2000– ==
In 2006, the sidings at Tinsley reached the national news when Daniel Matthews, an engineering apprentice, took to the site and joyrode a Class 08 shunting engine up and down the tracks.

In 2008, EWS operated the sidings at Tinsley. As of 2011 the DB Cargo UK yard handles steel for Avesta Sheffield (now part of Outokumpu).

=== Sheffield International Rail Freight Terminal ===
In the mid-2000s, land adjacent to the northwestern area of the former yard was used for the construction of the Sheffield International Rail Freight Terminal (SIRFT). The terminal consists of two warehouses of approximately 30,000 m^{2} (320,000 sq ft). SIRFT is rail connected with through connections southwards and northwards, and is equipped to deal with conventional and containerised wagon loads.

A third rail connected warehousing unit (of up to approximately 25,000 m^{2} (270,000 sq ft)) has approval for construction (as of 2011). In 2017 it was reported that the loading gauge had been increased to the W10 standard to allow the facility to handle 2.9 m (9 ft 6 in) Hi-Cube containers.

In 2021 Newell & Wright, a British road haulage company, opened an intermodal terminal on the site of the former marshalling yard. A new freight service between Felixstowe and the yard began in July 2021. The service is a partnership between GB Railfreight and Maersk.

== See also ==
- Sheffield City Airport – former airport located just south of the marshalling yard
