= Dore and Totley =

Electoral ward in the City of Sheffield, South Yorkshire, England

Coordinates: 53.324°N 1.526°W

- Shown within Sheffield
- Population: 16,740
- Metropolitan borough: City of Sheffield
- Metropolitan county: South Yorkshire
- Region: Yorkshire and the Humber
- Country: England
- Sovereign state: United Kingdom
- UK Parliament: Sheffield Hallam
- Councillors: Martin Smith (Liberal Democrats); Rebecca Atkinson (Liberal Democrats); Joe Otten (Liberal Democrats)

Dore and Totley ward—which includes the districts of Bradway, Dore, Totley, and Whirlow—is one of the 28 electoral wards in City of Sheffield, England. It is currently represented by three Liberal Democrat councillors. It is located in the southwestern part of the city and covers an area of 26.3 km^{2}. The population of this ward in 2001 was 16,404 people in 7,037 households. Dore and Totley ward is one of the five wards that make up the Sheffield Hallam Parliamentary constituency. The population of Dore and Totley is 16,740 (2011) with 7,334 Households.

== Districts of Dore and Totley ward ==
=== Dore ===
Dore (grid reference SK311812) is a village in South Yorkshire. Until 1934 it was part of Derbyshire, but it is now a suburb of Sheffield. The village lies on a hill above the River Sheaf, and has a reputation of being Sheffield's wealthiest suburb.

=== Totley ===
Totley (grid reference SK309799) is a suburb on the extreme southwest of Sheffield, next to the Yorkshire/Derbyshire boundary. Formerly a Derbyshire village, Totley officially became part of Sheffield in 1935.

Totley was mentioned in the Domesday Book of 1086 as Totinglee, the name meaning a forest clearing belonging to Tota (probably the Saxon lord). Totley Hall, built in 1623 and enlarged in the 19th century, was converted to a teacher training college in the 1950s and was latterly part of Sheffield Hallam University.

Totley is roughly divided into three areas: Totley, New Totley and Totley Rise. It is served by the Baslow road, which is a continuation of Abbeydale Road South (A621).

Through the district run the Totley Brook and the Old Hay Brook, which are the two sources of the River Sheaf. Totley also lends its name to Totley Tunnel, the longest underland rail tunnel in the UK. This takes the Sheffield to Manchester line from Totley underneath the Totley Moor to Grindleford in Derbyshire.

=== Bradway ===
Bradway grid reference SK330805 is a suburb in the south of Sheffield composed of three former Derbyshire villages: Upper Bradway, Bradway, and Lower Bradway. Bradway was annexed by Sheffield in the 1930s, thus placing it in the ceremonial county of South Yorkshire. The Bradway Tunnel opened in 1870 and carries the Midland Main Line underneath Bradway on its route from Sheffield to Chesterfield.

=== Whirlow ===
Whirlow (grid reference SK317828) lies north west of Dore, on the Limb Brook. It is home to Whirlow Hall Farm a working farm run as a children's charity and two parks. Whirlowbrook park is set in the 39 acre (158,000 m^{2}) grounds of Whirlowbrook Hall (built 1906) the former home of Sheffield industrialist Sir Walter Benton-Jones (1880–1967).

== Schools ==
Schools in the ward of Dore and Totley include Dore Primary School, Bradway Primary School, The Rowan Special School, Totley All Saints Church of England Voluntary Aided Primary School, Totley Primary School and King Ecgbert School.
