= Dore & Totley railway station =

Railway station in South Yorkshire, England

Dore & Totley
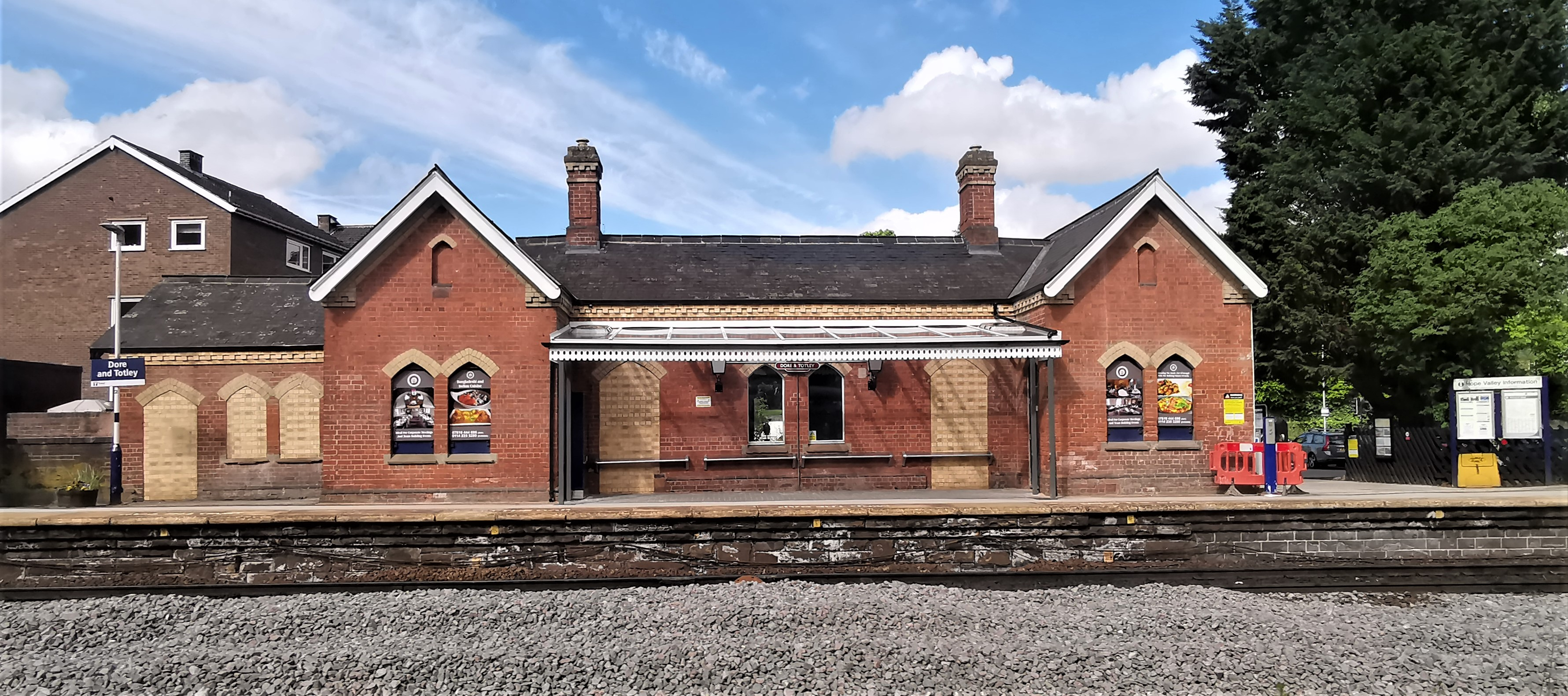
- Dore & Totley railway station in 2019

General information
- Location: Abbeydale, City of Sheffield; England
- Coordinates: 53.327570°N 1.515440°W
- Grid reference: SK323812
- Managed by: Northern Trains
- Transit authority: Travel South Yorkshire
- Platforms: 2
- Tracks: 4

Other information
- Station code: DOR
- Fare zone: Sheffield
- Classification: DfT category F2

History
- Original company: Midland Railway
- Pre-grouping: Midland Railway
- Post-grouping: London, Midland and Scottish Railway

Key dates
- 1 February 1872: Opened as Dore and Totley
- 18 March 1971: Renamed Dore
- 1 April 2008: Renamed Dore & Totley

Passengers
- 2020/21: ▼29,118
- 2021/22: ▲0.136 million
- 2022/23: ▲0.167 million
- 2023/24: ▲0.201 million
- 2024/25: ▲0.240 million
Location
Notes
- Passenger statistics from the Office of Rail and Road

Dore & Totley railway station serves the south-western Sheffield suburbs of Dore and Totley in South Yorkshire, England; it is sited 4 3/4 miles (7.6 km) south of Sheffield. The station is served by the Northern Trains route between Sheffield and Manchester Piccadilly, East Midlands Railway's service from Liverpool Lime Street to Norwich, and the TransPennine Express service between Liverpool and Cleethorpes; all three run via the Hope Valley Line.

== History ==
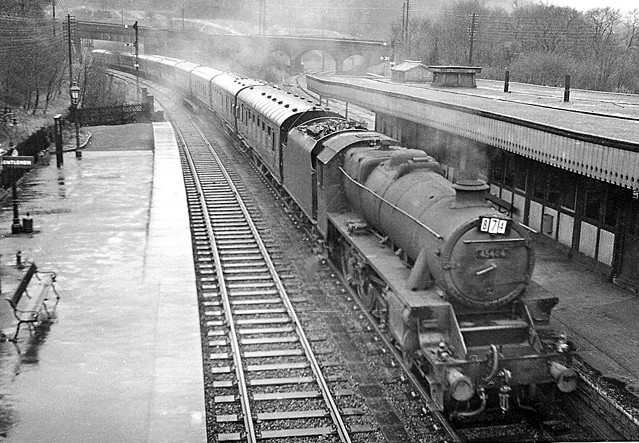
Dore and Totley in 1960

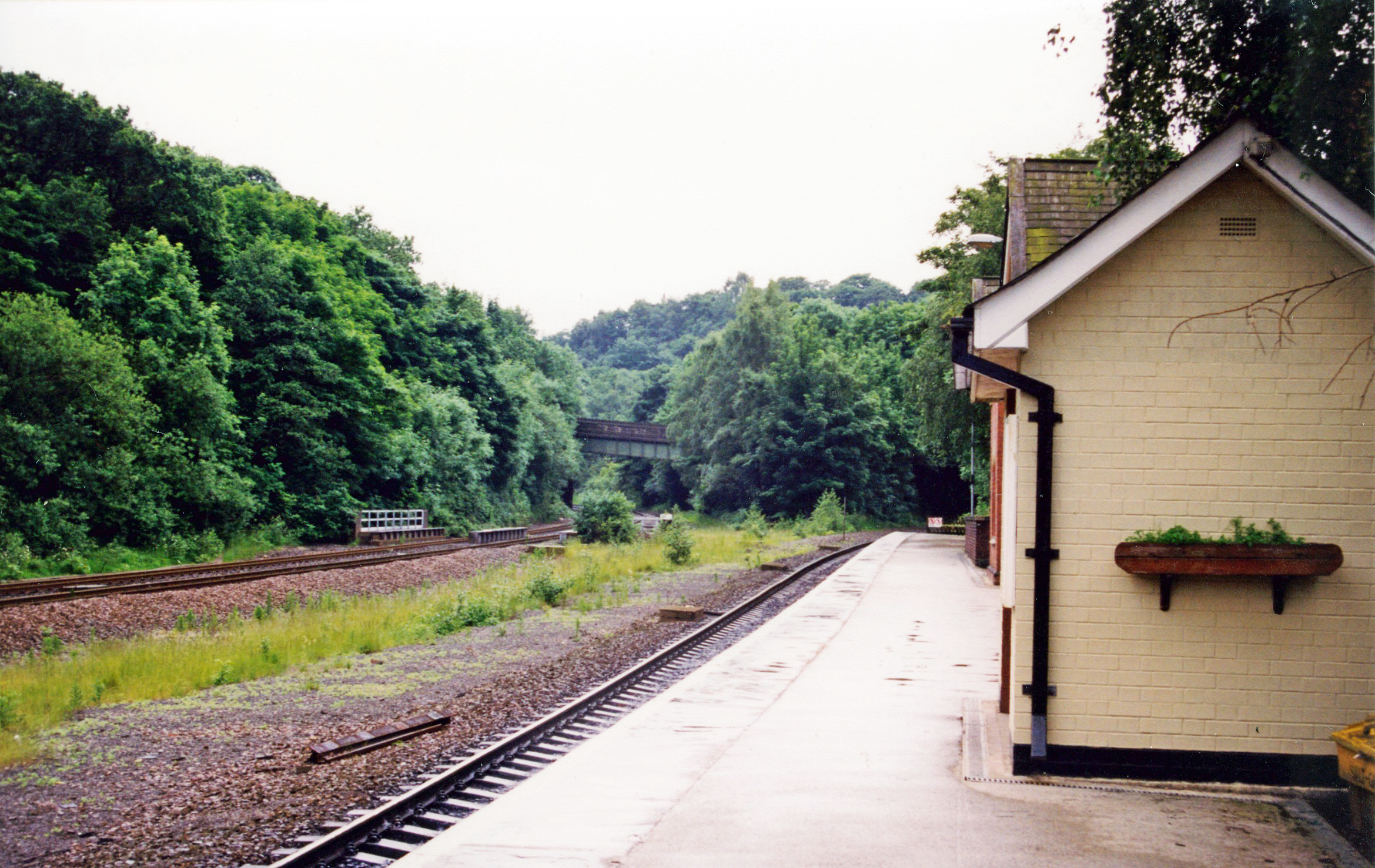
Dore station in 1998

The station was opened by the Midland Railway, for passengers only, as Dore and Totley on 1 February 1872 (at a building cost of £1,517 and £450 for 2 acres (8,100 m^{2}) of land) on the then two-year-old Midland Main Line extension from Chesterfield to Sheffield, and was initially served by the local services on this line. The station was then served by six or seven weekday trains and three on Sundays.

In 1894, the station became the junction for the new Dore and Chinley line (now the Hope Valley Line). Dore & Totley Station Junction was at the south end of the station and the signal box stood in the angle between the Chesterfield and Chinley lines.

Between 1901 and 1902, the line between Sheffield station and Dore was widened; the original twin tracks continued to be used by traffic for the Dore and Chinley line and two new tracks were built to the east of this for traffic on the main line to Chesterfield. The original southbound platform was converted to an island platform and a new platform for trains to Chesterfield built to the east. The line from Chesterfield was slewed into its present course to serve the new platforms. A new Dore Station Junction was made to the north of the station.

On 9 October 1907, a Sheffield to Birmingham and Bristol express train ran foul of the points at the station. One of the locomotives hit the platform and overturned. The driver and the second man were thrown from the cab but survived, and the passenger coaches fortunately stayed upright with no passengers injured.

Dore and Totley became south Sheffield's only remaining station after the Beeching cuts in the 1960s saw Beauchief, Millhouses and Heeley stations all close. The station was closed to main line traffic and became an unstaffed halt in 1969. It was renamed Dore on 18 March 1971. Subsequently, the island and eastern platforms were demolished in the mid-1980s. This meant that mainline services from the South could no longer stop at the station. In March 1985, the section of the Hope Valley Line through the station was converted to single-track, with trains in both directions stopping at the one remaining platform.

The single-track section through the station became a significant bottleneck, as noted in Network Rail's Yorkshire and Humber Route Utilisation Strategy of 2009. The strategy included proposals to address the problem by re-doubling the track and building a second platform (subject to funding being obtained). South Yorkshire Passenger Transport Executive had also been lobbying for this problem to be addressed (as noted in its 2006 Rail Strategy document).

The station site had previously been occupied by the Walk Mill; a water-powered mill in operation from the 1280s onwards was used by the monks of Beauchief Abbey to cleanse and thicken cloth.

The name Dore & Totley was restored in April 2008 when the station received new Northern Rail-branded running in boards. Plans to double the size of the station by 2014 were delayed. An additional platform and new Disability Discrimination Act 1995-compliant footbridge were to be provided. Construction work began in December 2012 on a new 129-space car-park, which was completed in April 2013.

Network Rail's Hope Valley Capacity Scheme included plans to restore the second platform at Dore & Totley. Plans included a new bridge with passenger lifts and a shelter on the single sided island platform for Manchester bound trains. This plan is spun out of the original Manchester Hub scheme, now renamed the Northern Hub, incorporating two freight passing loops to be constructed east of Bamford and at Dore South. Once completed an hourly stopping service was hoped to be provided (as stated in the new 2016 Northern franchise agreement), and platforms should be long enough to accommodate 6 car trains, now running on TPE fast services.

The Secretary of State for Transport approved the Capacity Scheme in February 2018 and Network Rail received tenders for a Design and Build contract that they hoped to have confirmed by the Department for Transport before the end of 2020 when the contract could then be let. A joint venture of Story and VolkerRail were awarded this contract in February 2021. Construction started in early 2022 with an intention to have it complete by autumn 2023. In January 2023 Network Rail announced that completion was now expected to be by spring 2024 and the cost had risen to £145 million.

In May 2019, a canopy was added to the 1872 station building.

On 8 April 2024 a new platform was opened at the station.

By late 2024, all of the planned work had been completed and the station was served by two lines and had two platforms.

=== Station masters ===
At the Eckington Petty Session on 25 November 1878, stationmaster Francis Wood was charged with embezzling money belonging to the Midland Railway company amounting to 1s. 1/2d. The railway company had auditors who travelled beyond the validity of their ticket and then paid the station master an excess fare. He appeared at the Derby Quarter Sessions on 2 January 1879. The jury found him not guilty, and he was discharged.

== Facilities ==
The station is unstaffed but has a self-service ticket machine available. The old station buildings are now in private commercial use as a restaurant. In the past a small brick waiting shelter was provided at the northern end of the platform, along with passenger information displays, automatic announcements and timetable poster boards to offer train running information. Step-free access is available from the adjacent car park to one of the platforms. As of 2025 both the platforms have been lengthened and can accommodate 6 carriage trains, a bridge has been constructed to allow passengers to reach the newly constructed platform 1, and there are a number of new shelters constructed to accommodate waiting passengers.

== Services ==
The station has an hourly Northern Trains stopping service in each direction on the Hope Valley Line between Sheffield and Manchester Piccadilly, augmented by a number of peak-hour stops (designed primarily for Manchester bound commuters) by faster trains on the South Trans-Pennine and Liverpool–Norwich routes. During the rest of the day those hourly TransPennine Express services and East Midlands Railway non-stopping trains pass through.

Preceding station	National Rail	Following station
Sheffield	Northern Trains Hope Valley Line	Grindleford
Sheffield	East Midlands Railway Liverpool-Norwich Limited service	Grindleford
Sheffield	TransPennine Express South TransPennine Limited services	Stockport
	Historical railways	
Beauchief; Line open, station closed	Midland Railway; Midland Main Line	Dronfield; Line and station open

== Sources ==
- Peter Fox (1990). The Midland Line in Sheffield. Sheffield: Platform 5 Publishing Ltd. ISBN 1-872524-16-8
- Peter Harvey (1996). Abbeydale and Millhouses. Stround: The Charlford Publishing Company Limited. ISBN 0-7524-0732-5
- Ecclesall Woods Archaeology - Heritage Woods Online.
