= Heeley railway station =

Disused railway station in South Yorkshire, England

Heeley
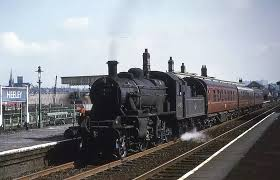
- Heeley Station 1960s

General information
- Location: London Road, Heeley, City of Sheffield; England
- Coordinates: 53.36132°N 1.47329°W
- Grid reference: SK351850
- Platforms: 2/4

Other information
- Status: Disused

History
- Pre-grouping: Midland Railway
- Post-grouping: LMSR; London Midland Region of British Railways

Key dates
- 1 February 1870: Opened
- 1901–03: Extended to four platforms
- 10 June 1968: Closed
Location

Heeley railway station was a railway station in Sheffield, England. The station served the suburbs of Heeley, Meersbrook, Abbeydale and Lowfield and was situated on the Midland Main Line off London Road in Heeley, lying between Sheffield Midland station and Millhouses & Ecclesall railway station.

Plan of Heeley station c.1890

The station opened with the inauguration of the Midland Railway's main line between Chesterfield and Sheffield on 1 February 1870. This new station of 1870 was designed by the company architect John Holloway Sanders.

It was built on an embankment between the A61, London Road South and the River Sheaf. During construction both the road and river were diverted to create space for the station and sidings.

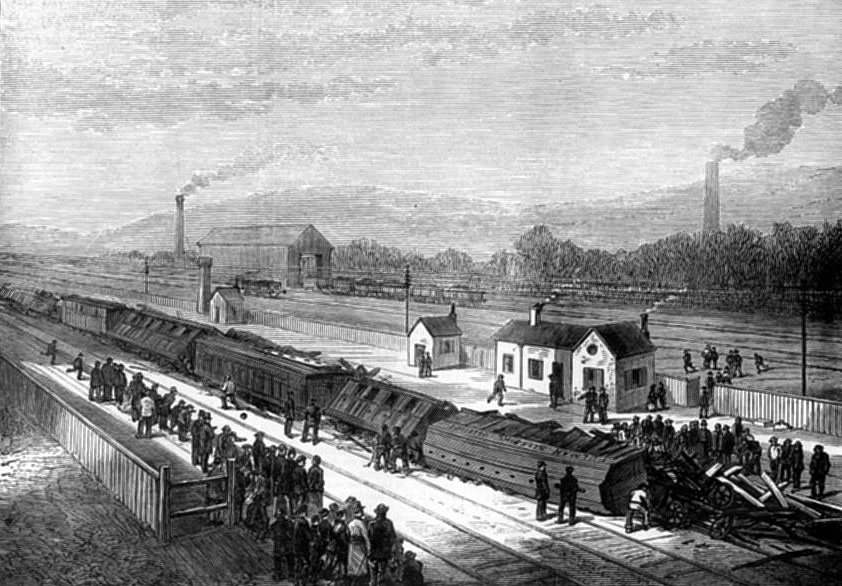
Railway accident at Heeley station in 1876 (contemporary engraving)

On 22 November 1876 an overnight passenger train from London St Pancras to Scotland via Carlisle derailed at Heeley due to a track defect, causing several people to be injured.

Initially the station had two platforms but this was increased to four when the line from Sheffield to Dore was widened between 1901 and 1903. Heeley station was the only station on this section of the line that was an elevated station with subway access from below to the platforms.

During the Great Sheffield Gale in 1962, there was a near miss at the station as a London to Sheffield express train narrowly avoided crashing into debris blown onto the tracks by the devastating storm; the station itself suffered damage which was never fully repaired. Heeley station closed on 10 June 1968 at the same time as Millhouses & Ecclesall railway station and all the platform buildings were demolished. The subway is still present although both entrances have been blocked in; the entrance on London Road can be seen and iron railings are present.

In July 2017, it was proposed by Local Enterprise Partnership that new stations should be built at Millhouses and Heeley as well as new platforms at Dore & Totley. The plans would be part of a call to have better links in South Yorkshire area as well as plans for a new Woodhead Route reopening.

Preceding station	Historical railways	Following station
Millhouses and Ecclesall; Line open, station closed	Midland Railway; Midland Main Line	Sheffield Midland; Line and station open
