= Abbeydale Road =

Road in Sheffield, England

Coordinates: 53.35596°N 1.48488°W

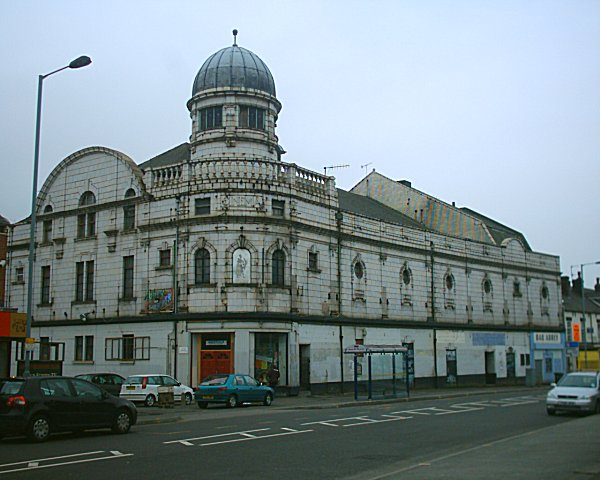
The Abbeydale Cinema on Abbeydale Road in 2006.

Abbeydale Road and its continuation Abbeydale Road South together are an arterial main road and bus route in Sheffield, South Yorkshire, England. The road begins at a junction with London Road near the former Royal Hotel public house. As Abbeydale Road it leads south-west from London Road at Sharrow, becoming Abbeydale Road South near Millhouses and leading to the railway bridge over the Dore and Chinley Railway, before becoming Baslow Road.

The road forms part of the A621. The road passes through Sharrow, Abbeydale, Millhouses, Beauchief and ends at Totley. Abbeydale Road is home to the historic Abbeydale Picture House. Until 8 October 1960, trams of the Sheffield Tramway ran from Sheffield City Centre along Abbeydale Road to its Millhouses terminus. The road has been converted to a dual-carriageway from Millhouses to the Baslow Road railway bridge.
