= Beauchief and Greenhill =

Electoral ward in the City of Sheffield, South Yorkshire, England

Coordinates: 53.331°N 1.488°W

- Shown within Sheffield
- Population: 19,669 (2016)
- Metropolitan borough: City of Sheffield
- Metropolitan county: South Yorkshire
- Region: Yorkshire and the Humber
- Country: England
- Sovereign state: United Kingdom
- UK Parliament: Sheffield Heeley
- Councillors: Simon Clement-Jones (Liberal Democrats); Sophie Thornton(Liberal Democrats); Richard Craig (Liberal Democrats)

Beauchief and Greenhill ward, which includes the suburban areas of Batemoor, Beauchief, Chancet Wood, Greenhill, Jordanthorpe, Lowedges and Meadowhead, is one of the 28 electoral wards in the City of Sheffield, England. It is in the southern part of the city and covers an area of 2.4 square miles (6.2 km^{2}). The population of the ward in 2016 was estimated to be 19,669 people in 9,209 houses.

It is one of the five wards that form the Sheffield Heeley parliamentary constituency.

The districts of this ward were in the historic county of Derbyshire until they were annexed into the county borough of Sheffield in 1934, and associated with the West Riding of Yorkshire. They were therefore included in the metropolitan county of South Yorkshire when this was established in 1974.

== Parks and recreation ==
About a third of the area of the ward is taken up by the grounds of Beauchief Abbey and Beauchief Hall. These include Ladies' Spring Wood, Parkbank Wood, Beauchief Park, and two golf courses. Also within the ward are Hutcliffe Wood and Chancet Wood.

== Schools ==
Schools in this ward include Meadowhead School, Greenhill Primary, Lower Meadow Primary Academy and Lowedges Junior Academy.

== Localities in Beauchief and Greenhill ward ==
=== Beauchief ===
Beauchief (/ˈbiːtʃɪf/ BEE-chif) lies on a hill above the River Sheaf and the Abbeydale Industrial Hamlet. Beauchief (grid reference SK333817) is notable for two buildings, still surrounded by parkland: Beauchief Abbey and Beauchief Hall. Beauchief railway station closed on 1 January 1961 after serving the area for 90 years.

==== Beauchief Abbey ====
Beauchief Abbey was built in 1183 by the canons who had mills on the River Sheaf and a sheep grange on Strawberry Lee. It was named Beau meaning beautiful and chief meaning headland. The abbey was founded in 1175, Beauchief Abbey was the only Premonstratensian abbey in the West Riding of Yorkshire.

In c. 1300 the Chaworth family donated the whole village of Greenhill to the monastery at Beauchief.

The ruined abbey buildings were dismantled to provide stone for the construction of Beauchief Hall in 1671 with the exception of the bell tower. The tower area was converted into the Pegge family chapel, the interior displays several armorial plaques of Pegge family members.

The carp pond is well known spot for local anglers. The ponds are also frequented by heron and other waterfowl.

Beauchief Abbey farm was built around 1700. Produce from the farm and fish from its pond, fed the monks.

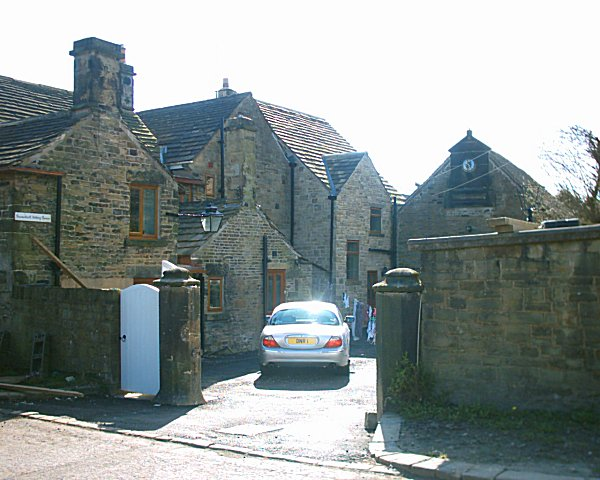
Beauchief Abbey House.

Pegge Family Arms.

==== Beauchief Abbey House ====
Beauchief Abbey House is a group of houses on Beauchief Abbey Lane. It is situated at the bottom of the lane in view of the abbey. The barn adjacent to Beauchief Abbey House has been identified as dating from the early 16th century and a modern house in limestone and steel has been built next to the main house. Archaeological work has been made in the grounds of house but not yet been published.

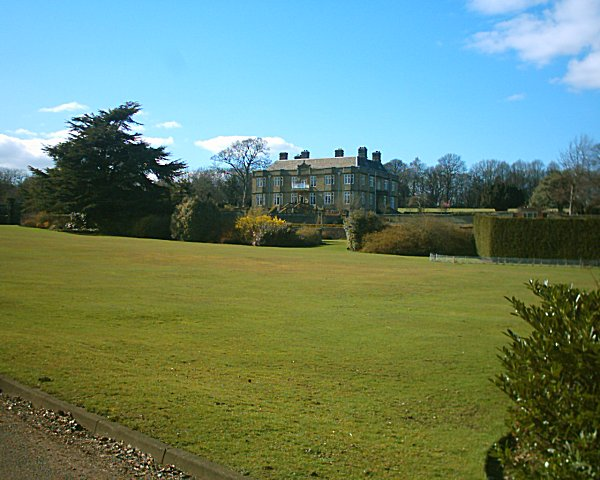
Beauchief Hall

==== Beauchief Hall ====
Beauchief Hall is a large manor house on the high ground of Beauchief. The house was built in 1671 by Edward Pegge of the Ashbourne family who had acquired the estate by marriage to Gertrude Strelley in 1648. Pegge served as Sheriff of Derbyshire in 1667 whilst resident in Pegge's cottage the house adjacent to the current hall. A fireplace in the hall shows a bust of Edward Pegge with the arms of the Pegge and Strelley families, the fireplace is said to have been a gift from the Mundy family.

The hall and grounds passed from the family with the sale of the property by Edward Strelley Pegge Burnell in 1923. Ending Joseph Hunter's statement in Hallamshire 1819 that "We have in this family an instance, which by some has been supposed rare, of the direct descendants of the original grantee possessing and residing upon the abbey-lands granted to their ancestor"

From 1923 the house served as a school (De la Salle College), In 1958, the Hall and grounds were acquired by the De La Salle College, the grounds being used as playing fields for the college boys. For six years, the Hall was on lease to the Beauchief Independent Grammar School for Girls, and was subsequently a hotel. The hall itself is now in private ownership. Some outhouses have been turned into private houses and other businesses and organisations own the remaining buildings on the site. The path up to Bradway passes near Beauchief Hall.

=== Greenhill ===
Greenhill (/ˈɡriːnhɪl/ or /ˈɡrɛnɪl/ GREN-il) is a suburb of Sheffield, England. Nearby settlements include Bradway, Meadowhead, Abbeydale and Woodseats.

Historic Greenhill village is a Conservation Area comprising one of the most complete set of 18th & 19th century buildings in South Yorkshire. It follows the route of the ridgeway route from Gleadless to Calver.

Extensive building on the 20th century linked Greenhill to Abbey Lane and to Woodseats. Extensive housing developments in the 1930s were added to in the 1950s and 1960s when the primary school, the library and St Peter’s. Church were all built. The main shopping area was created on Bocking Lane at this time.

The Greenhill Hall site of 220 acres was virgin country in 1952, but the area was populated with 3176 dwellings by 1962 during the redevelopment of post-war Sheffield by J. L. Womersley's town planning department. This area is known as Lowedges but history is traced by the name Greenhill Park which is in Lowedges, and now marks the very southern boundary of Sheffield. This comprised a diversity of homes, including bed-sitting room flats for single occupants to four-bedroom houses, two shopping centres, a primary school, a residential home and a health centre. The neighbourhood contains some groups of houses designed on Radburn principles to separate the inhabitants from traffic.

Greenhill (grid reference SK345814) has a library, primary school, church and shops. There are also several bus routes which service the area including the 76, 86, 25, 25A, M17 and 293; the last service of which even goes into Derbyshire.

=== Chancet Wood ===
Chancet Wood (grid reference SK342821) is part of the Meadowhead area, it consists mainly of a housing estate and a woodland area with the same name. In its area is a caterers, a nursery, a children's centre and primary school. The area has its own football team Chancet Wood F.C. which is part of The FA Sheffield & District Fair Play League.

Local Transport - TM Travel 76a (Chancet Wood-Arundel Gate)

=== Lowedges ===
Lowedges (grid reference SK351806) has some 3,000 homes and is located at the southern edge of the city on the boundary with Derbyshire. It was built on the grounds of Greenhill Hall (now demolished) which gave its name to Greenhill Park at the southern boundary of Sheffield. Lowedges is formed of council and private houses and flats as well as a selection of shops and one public house, The Grennel Mower.

The original name "Low Edges" was given to a farm located on the east side of the Sheffield to Derby Turnpike, now called Chesterfield Road. The farm itself was made up of several strips, located on both sides of the Turnpike which had in their names the word Lowedge. "Lowedge" in this context, is a description rather than a name, "low" being the Derbyshire name for a hill and "edge", meaning just that, a strip on the edge of a hill or low. Renting some of these strips and bring them together into a single farming unit would have prompted the tenant, one William Webster, to call this new farm "Low Edges".

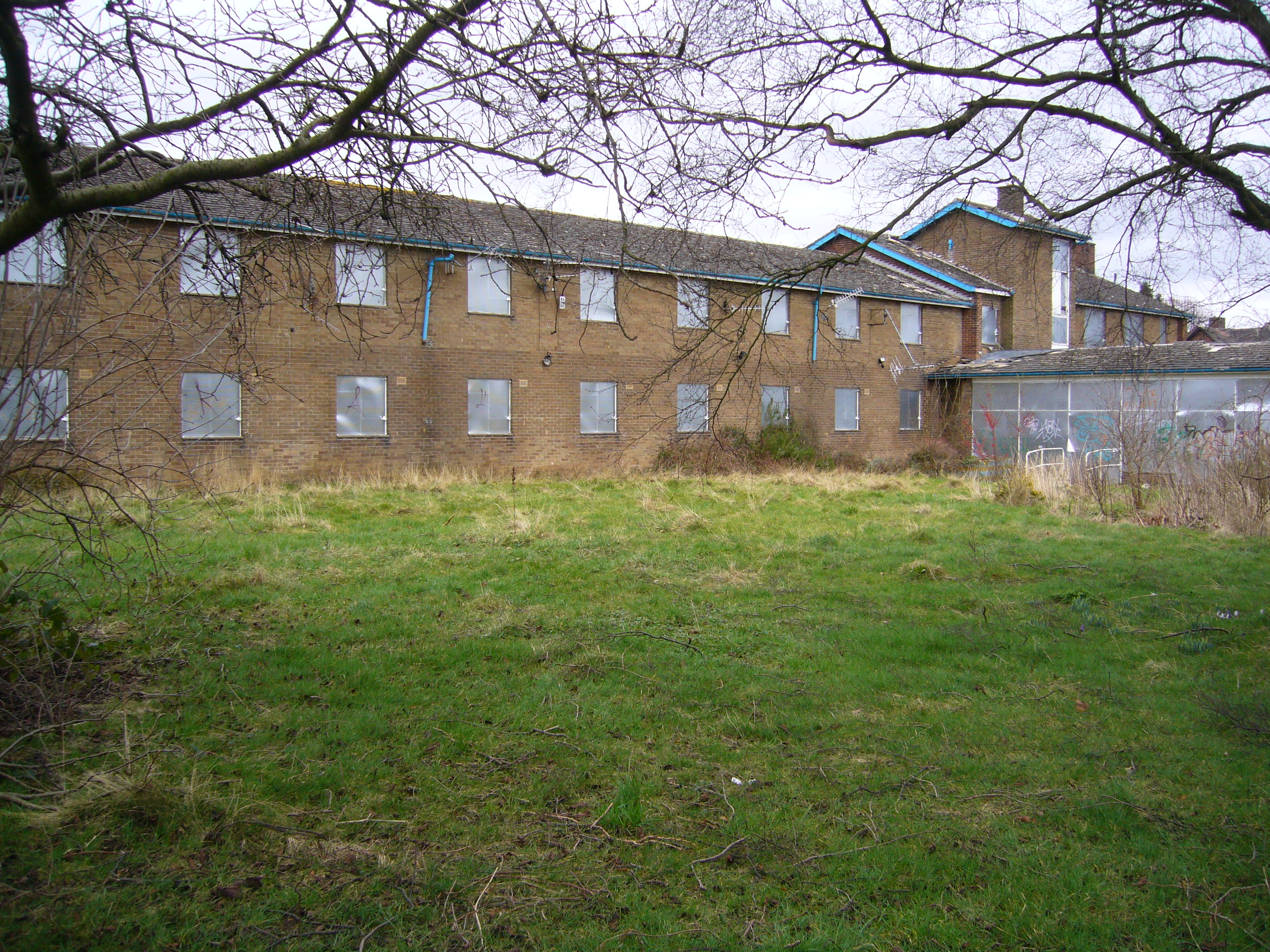
Old people's home (now closed), Lowedges, Sheffield, February 2014

Lowedges is home to the Transport Recreation Ground, Lowedges Fire Station, Greenhill Park, Greenhill and Bradway Youth Club, a Tenants' Meeting Hall, and three churches. It is also home to The Terminus Initiative formed by the co-operation of four local churches to build an organisation capable of helping residents engage in projects and activities and provide help where needed. The Terminus Initiative runs The Terminus Cafe, a regular meeting place for residents run by volunteers, and offers a range of services in partnership with Sheffield Council. It is a world-renowned venture and has been visited by delegations from both UK based and overseas organisations.

A map of Greenhill derived from a survey made by W & J Fairbank in 1804 and 1805 shows and names the strips. Five of the seven strips rented by William Webster include the word Lowedge. In addition, the map depicts a "Lowedge Lane" running adjacent to the east of those strips. In total there are nine fields shown with Lowedge in their name. The strip names were made up of an additional descriptor, such as "Long", "Top", "Nether", "Upper", "Five Acre" and "Four Acre". It is possible that more strips existed to the east of Lowedge Lane, that being the eastern extent of the map. The map is available from Sheffield City Libraries.

A single row of terrace houses along the west side of the southern part of Chesterfield Road forms one of the most southerly groups of buildings in Sheffield, and is the second place to carry the name Lowedges. This terrace of houses was built between 1905 and 1910 when Lowedges Farm still existed. When the terrace was built the name Low Edges became the name of this hamlet, including both the farm and the houses.

Local Transport – First services 76/76a/76e (Meadowhall–Lowedges via City Centre) and 24 (Woodhouse – Lowedges via City Centre) terminate at Lowedges Terminus. These are high frequency buses during the day time.

=== Batemoor ===
Batemoor (grid reference SK355805) is a housing estate in the south of Sheffield. It is located to the southeast of Greenhill and borders Lowedges, Jordanthorpe and the Derbyshire countryside and farming country, being only a couple of miles from the villages of Coal Aston and Holmesfield, and on the edge of the town of Dronfield.

The estate was built circa 1964, and consists largely of prefabricated flat-roofed housing, along with blocks of maisonettes/flats.

Public transport is provided by First South Yorkshire, with routes 75 (Chapeltown – Jordanthorpe) and 75a (Fox Hill – Jordanthorpe); and Stagecoach, with route 1 (High Green – Jordanthorpe); both of these buses go through the city centre. This is a high-frequency bus during day time.

Sheffield artist Pete McKee grew up on Batemoor and still lives in the area.

Batemoor is home to an ambulance station and Lower Meadow Primary Academy, both located on Batemoor Road and accessible via public transport, and to Meadowhead School, which is located on Dyche Lane toward the top end of Batemoor.

=== Jordanthorpe ===
Jordanthorpe (grid reference SK360811) is located to the east of Batemoor and south of Norton. It is a housing estate consisting of houses and flats. Jordanthorpe is surrounded by three main roads:

- Dyche Lane, which separates Jordanthorpe from Batemoor: this road leads towards Dronfield and Norton.
- the A6102 (Bochum Parkway, named after Sheffield's German sister-city, Bochum), which runs north and connects to Lowedges, Greenhill and Meadowhead, and
- Jordanthorpe Parkway: this road surrounds the remaining area of Jordanthorpe and runs to the south of Batemoor, connecting the A6102 to the A61.

Jordanthorpe Centre is a shopping area located between Dyche Road and Dyche Lane. It includes a hair salon, convenience stores (Heron Foods and Nisa Jordanthorpe Food & Wine), a Chinese takeaway, a fish and chip shop and a Post Office. Just outside of the centre is the Jordanthorpe Health Centre and White Willows (an assisted living residence). White Willows is located on the site of the former Jordanthorpe Complex, it consisted of 3 tower blocks, each 15 storeys tall, named; Chantry (demolished in 2012), Ramsey and Rhodes (demolished in 2001).

To the north along the A6102 is the St James Retail Park, sited on the grounds of the former Sheffield College Norton Campus and just across the road from Meadowhead School.

Just next to St James Retail Park is the new Graves Health and Sports Centre. Its facilities include a Gym, Pools, Studios, Tennis Courts and a Gymnastics and Trampolining Hall.

In recent years there have been multiple housing developments: a new block of houses was built around Dyche Drive which includes private parking for residents. In 2017/18 a row of 4 houses was built at the corner of Dyche Road and Dyche Close.

Public transport is provided by First South Yorkshire, with routes 75 (High Green – Jordanthorpe) and 75a (Shiregreen – Jordanthorpe); and Stagecoach, with route 1 (High Green – Jordanthorpe); both of these buses go through the city centre. These are high-frequency buses during day time.

=== Meadowhead ===
Meadowhead, lies east of Beauchief and north of Greenhill at grid reference SK344821. There is a Morrisons supermarket, along with two primary schools: Abbey Lane and St Thomas of Canterbury (Catholic).
