= Millhouses engine shed =

Engine shed in Millhouse, Sheffield

Coordinates: 53°20′56.2″N 1°29′23.9″W

Millhouses engine shed was an engine shed in Millhouses, Sheffield. It was built by the Midland Railway in 1901 as Ecclesall engine shed, to serve the Midland Main Line. It was used mainly to stable passenger and mixed-traffic locomotives for use on trains from the nearby Sheffield Midland station. The shed was built next to Millhouses railway station; it had 8 dead end roads, and could handle about forty steam locomotives. Ecclesall shed was renamed Millhouses in 1920. Millhouses bore the shed code 25A, then 19B in 1935 and finally 41C in 1958.

== Locomotives ==
During LMS ownership the shed was home mostly to 4-4-0 engines until the arrival of Jubilee steam engines in 1937. In 1959 the shed had an allocation of thirty-three engines, including twelve Jubilee steam engines. 1960 saw the arrival of seven Royal Scots.

== Closure ==
Millhouses shed closed on 1 January 1962, the shed's remaining engines were transferred to Canklow, Barrow Hill Engine Shed and Staveley Great Central.

In December 2015 it was demolished and the site is now on the market as development land.

The former shed yard is now the home of the large Tesco supermarket on Abbeydale Road

== Picture gallery ==
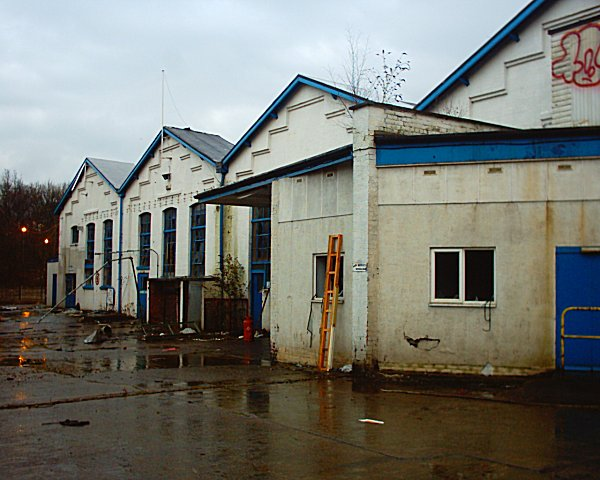

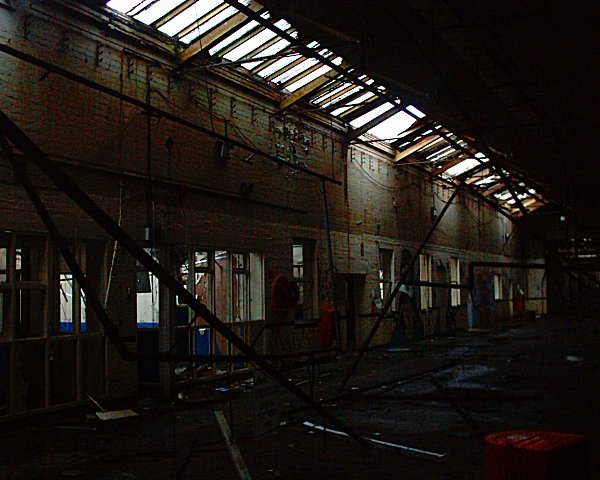

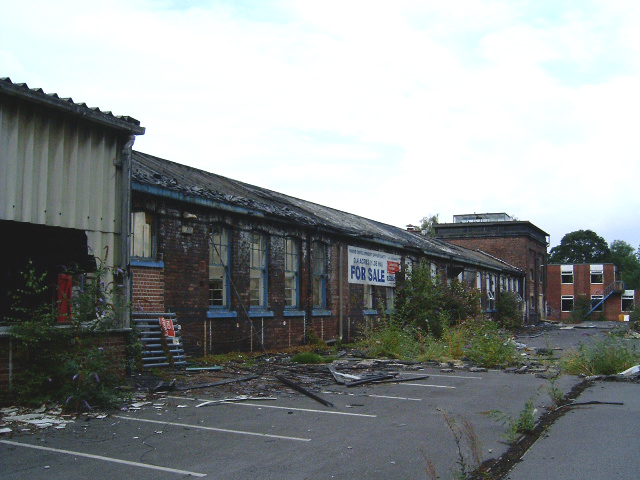
