= Hutcliffe Wood =

Woodland in Sheffield, England

Coordinates: 53.343°N 1.496°W

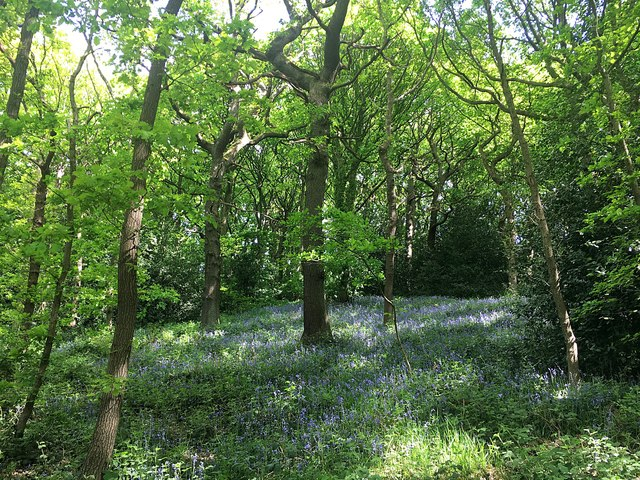
Hutcliffe Wood

Hutcliffe Wood and Marriott Wood are two areas of ancient woodland in Sheffield, South Yorkshire, England. They occupy the steep southeastern side of the Abbeydale valley between Archer Road and Abbey Lane, separated by the River Sheaf and the railway line from Millhouses Park. Hutcliffe Wood Road divides the two areas of woodland, Hutcliffe Wood to the west and Marriott Wood to the east.

In the past, the woods have been managed with the coppice-with-standards technique for the production of charcoal, and ganister is also believed to have been mined in this area. Both of these products were used by local industry. The woods are currently made up of mature deciduous trees, and are currently managed by Sheffield City Council for the benefit of wildlife and public recreation. Several public footpaths run through the woods.
