= Abbeydale, Sheffield =

Area of Sheffield in South Yorkshire, England

Coordinates: 53.358833°N 1.481306°W

Abbeydale
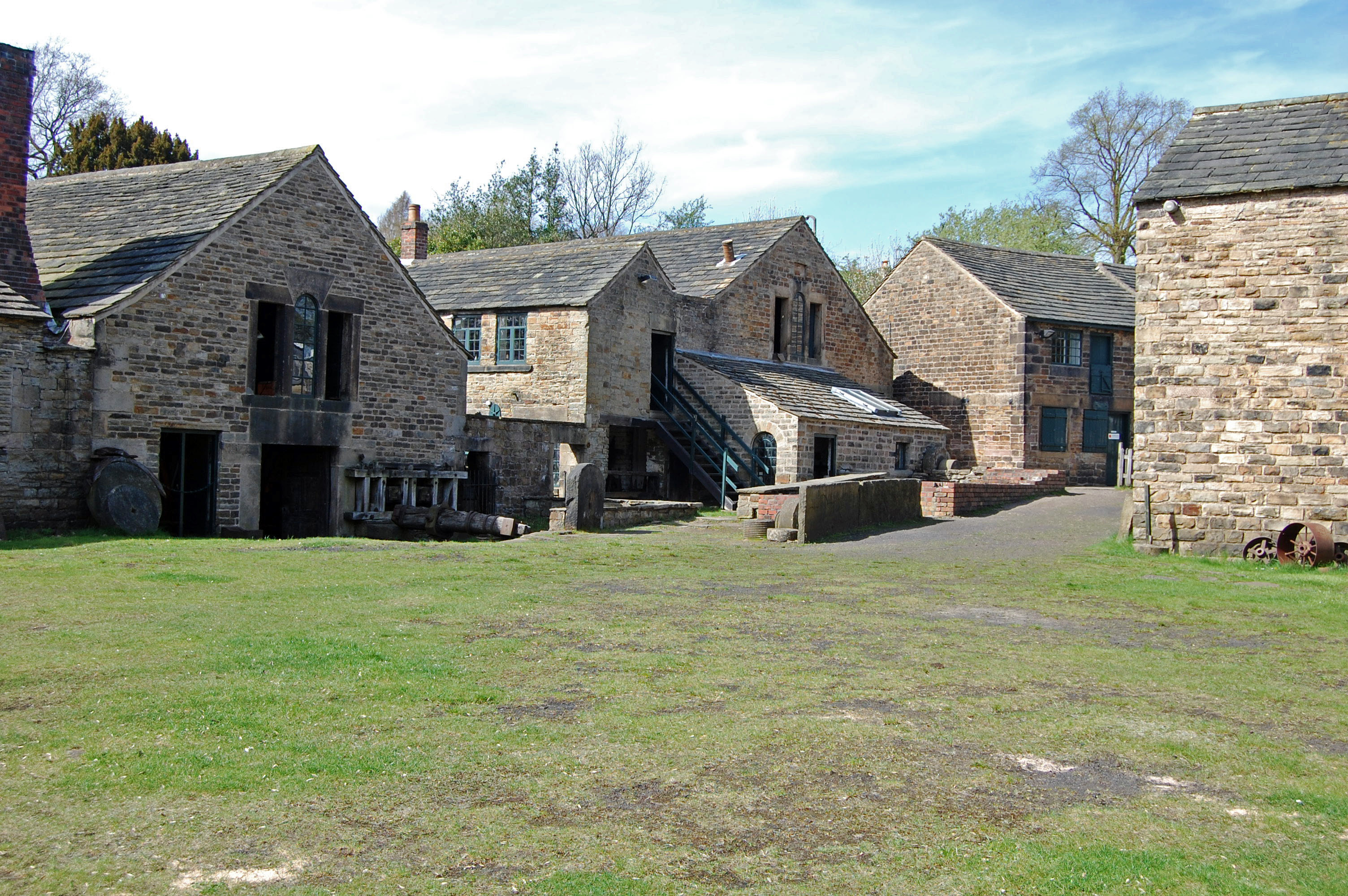
- Abbeydale Industrial Hamlet

- Location within Sheffield
- Population: 23,834 (Nether Edge and Sharrow (ward)) (2021)
  - London: 159 mi (256 km) SE
- Metropolitan borough: City of Sheffield
- Metropolitan county: South Yorkshire
- Region: Yorkshire and the Humber
- Country: England
- Sovereign state: United Kingdom
- Post town: SHEFFIELD
- Postcode district: S7
- Dialling code: 0114
- Police: South Yorkshire
- Fire: South Yorkshire
- Ambulance: Yorkshire
- UK Parliament: Sheffield Central

Abbeydale is an area of Sheffield in South Yorkshire, England that follows the valley of the River Sheaf. It covers many districts of Sheffield in the south-west of the city running roughly from Heeley Bridge in the district of Heeley to Dore Road between Beauchief and Totley. It is named for the Abbey that existed at Beauchief from the 12th century to 1537. The area is part of the Nether Edge and Sharrow ward of the city. Abbeydale Road, part of the A621, is the main road along the valley.

Although not the official name of any district, many businesses and institutions in the valley use Abbeydale in their name. These include:

- Abbeydale Brewery
- Abbeydale Park in Dore
- Abbeydale Picture House, a Grade II listed former cinema which was situated at 387 Abbeydale Road
- Abbeydale Grange School, in Millhouses
- Abbeydale Industrial Hamlet, a former scythe works, now a museum and scheduled monument
- Churches Together in Abbeydale.

Beauchief railway station was originally called Beauchief and Abbey Dale railway station.
