= Beauchief railway station =

Disused railway station in South Yorkshire, England

Beauchief
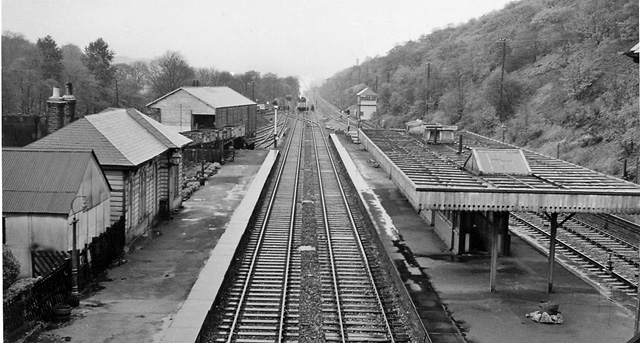
- Beauchief station in 1961

General information
- Location: Abbeydale, City of Sheffield; England
- Coordinates: 53.335833°N 1.508056°W
- Grid reference: SK328822
- Platforms: 2/4

Other information
- Status: Disused

History
- Pre-grouping: Midland Railway
- Post-grouping: LMSR; London Midland Region of British Railways

Key dates
- 1 February 1870: Opened as Abbey Houses
- 1 April 1870: renamed Beauchief
- 1 May 1874: renamed Beauchief and Abbey Dale
- 1901–3: Expanded to four platforms
- 19 March 1914: renamed Beauchief
- 2 January 1961: Closed for passengers
- 15 June 1964: closed for goods
Location

Beauchief railway station (pronounced Beechif) was in Sheffield, South Yorkshire, England.

It was built by the Midland Railway in 1870 and was designed by the company architect John Holloway Sanders.

The station served the communities of Beauchief, Woodseats and Ecclesall and was situated on the Midland Main Line between Millhouses railway station and Dore & Totley station, near Abbeydale Road South in Abbeydale. The station was originally called Abbey Houses and later Beauchief & Abbey Dale station.

The station was opened on the site of Hutcliffe Mill at the same time as the main line from Chesterfield. At opening it had two platforms, but this was increased to four with the widening which took place between 1901 and 1903. It closed on 1 January 1961. The stationmasters house survives as a private residence and the nearby Abbeydale Station Hotel was renamed the Beauchief Hotel. In 2018 the hotel site was redeveloped as luxury apartments.

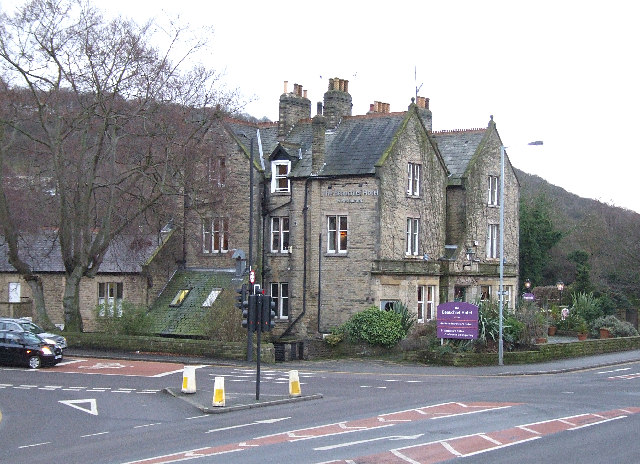
The Beauchief Hotel, formerly the Abbeydale Station Hotel

Preceding station	Historical railways	Following station
Dore & Totley; Line and station open	Midland Railway; Midland Main Line	Millhouses and Ecclesall; Line open, station closed
