= Abbeydale Picture House =

Cinema in Sheffield, England

Coordinates: 53.35936°N 1.47992°W

- Abbeydale Cinema
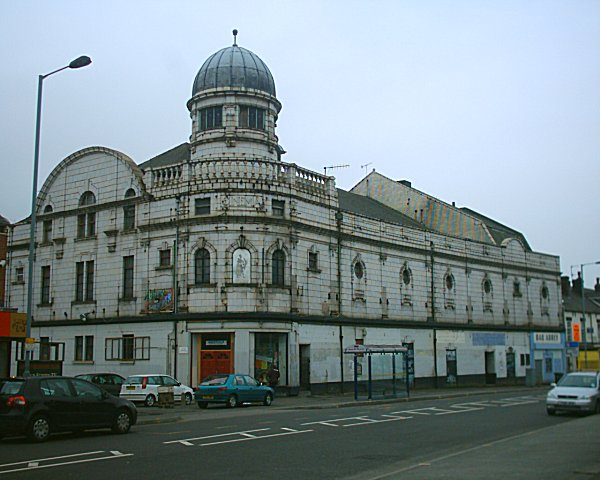
- The Abbeydale Cinema on Abbeydale Road in 2006.
- Interactive map of Abbeydale Picture House
- Address: 387 Abbeydale Road; Sheffield; England
- Designation: Grade II listing
- Current use: Under Renovation

Construction
- Opened: 20 December 1920
- Closed: 5 July 1975
- Years active: 1920–1975

Abbeydale Picture House (later Abbeydale Cinema) is a former cinema in Sheffield, South Yorkshire, England. When opened by the Lord Mayor of Sheffield on 20 December 1920 the picture house was the largest and most luxurious cinema in Sheffield, often referred to as the "Picture Palace" because of the luxurious cream and gold colour scheme, and dark mahogany seats trimmed with green velvet. The picture house also boasted many intricate decorations and carvings, a mosaic floor in the foyer and a glass canopy with a marble pillar to the outside of the building.

The Abbeydale Picturehouse Bar reopened on 1 December 2022.

== History ==
The first film to be shown was The Call of the Road. The cinema had seating for 1,560 people and also included a ballroom and a billiard hall. Cine-variety played a major role at the Abbeydale until 1930 and the arrival of the "talkies" talking films; from this time the stage was used purely to house the sound equipment. In the mid-1950s the cinema was purchased by the Star Cinema Group which decorated the entire building and installed new projection and sound equipment, including a wide screen.

The cinema closed on 5 July 1975 and was subsequently used as an office furniture showroom until 1991. In 1989 the building was given a Grade II listing by English Heritage being a good example of an early 1920s mid-sized suburban cinema with both cinema and theatre facilities. In 1991 the sprung floor in the ballroom was removed, and local businesses "Abbey Snooker" and "Bar Abbey" occupied the site.

In 2003 the Friends of Abbeydale Picture House—boasting patrons including Michael Palin, Peter Stringfellow and the John Lewis Partnership—was formed to "restore and manage the 'Picture Palace' as a community centre for the performing arts and visual media." The group took ownership of the building on 21 December 2005 and re-opened it in September 2008 following a restoration of the auditorium and installation of a new stage.

The Abbeydale Picture House hosted regular performances and fundraisers to raise money towards the ongoing restoration of the building. In June 2012 a stage adaptation of Hi-de-Hi! was produced by the picture house in conjunction with the family of the late David Croft. The building is open for guided tours as part of the Heritage Open Days program. The Friends of Abbeydale Picture House eventually went into administration and the building went into receivership

On 30 October 2012 the picture house was sold at auction to Phil Robins, for £150,000 with the intention to renovate the building and bring it back into public use as a climbing and sports centre. During this period further renovations were undertaken by Phil Robins, assisted during 2015-16 by Hand Of.

In January 2017 Abbeydale Picture House was leased to CADS Trust, a Sheffield-based arts charity, who are continuing the restoration project. The building is now regularly open to the public as a mixed use community arts venue as work progresses.

In January 2025 Abbeydale Picture House was acquired by True North Brew Co, a Sheffield-based hospitality company and brewery.
