= Millhouses, Sheffield =

Neighbourhood in Sheffield, England

Coordinates: 53.350°N 1.497°W

Millhouses
- Suburb
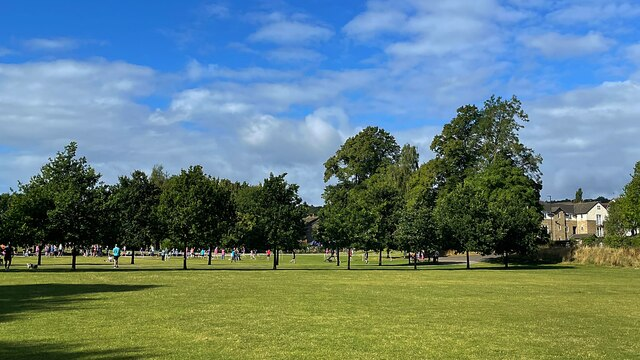
- Millhouses park

- Location within South Yorkshire
- Metropolitan borough: Sheffield
- Metropolitan county: South Yorkshire
- Region: Yorkshire and the Humber
- Country: England
- Sovereign state: United Kingdom
- Post town: Sheffield
- Postcode district: S7
- Dialling code: 0114
- Police: South Yorkshire
- Fire: South Yorkshire
- Ambulance: Yorkshire
- UK Parliament: Sheffield Hallam

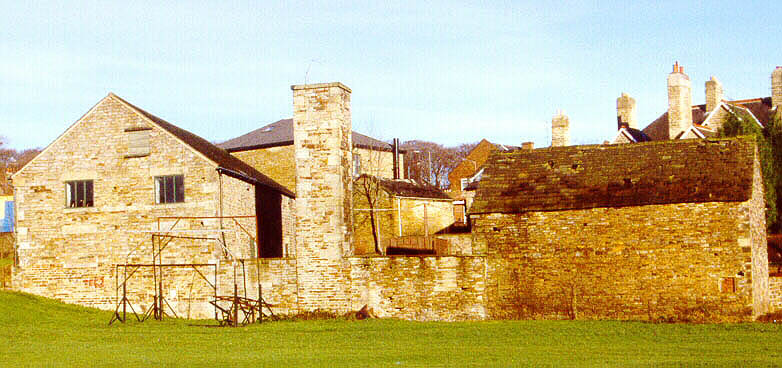
Ecclesall Corn Mill—the mill that gives Millhouses its name.

Millhouses is a suburb in the City of Sheffield, England. It is located in Ecclesall ward; in the south-western portion of the city on the northwest bank of the River Sheaf. Its origins lie in a small hamlet that grew around the Ecclesall Corn Mill. It has a population (2006 estimate) of 4,424.

The agriculture and industries of this area are now largely gone, leaving Millhouses as a mostly residential area. Local amenities include three schools, a 31.8 acres (12.87 ha) park, three pubs, three supermarkets, three churches, several restaurants and cafés and numerous small shops.

== Geography ==
Millhouses is set in 380 acres (1.55 km^{2}) of the part of the Sheaf valley known as Abbeydale. It is bordered to the southeast by the River Sheaf and Hutcliffe Wood, to the west by Ecclesall Woods, Millhouses Lane and Button Hill, and to the north by Carter Knowle Road and Bannerdale Road. Running directly alongside the River Sheaf is the long and thin Millhouses Park. The main road through the area is the A621 Abbeydale Road/Abbeydale Road South. The Midland Main Line and the Trans-Pennine Hope Valley Line travel close to the village of Millhouses, almost parallel with the River Sheaf . There was a railway station off Archer Road, the Millhouses & Ecclesall railway station which closed in 1968. Plans to reopen the station and others nearby are currently under consideration. Dore & Totley is the nearest railway station

Residential development was in a fan-shape focused on the junction of Abbeydale Road and Millhouses Lane. Most houses in the area were built in the 1920s although there are some that date from the late 19th century.

Millhouses was originally part of the Ecclesall Bierlow area, in the West Riding of Yorkshire. Up until the 20th century Millhouses was a border village, it was on the Yorkshire side of the River Sheaf, which at that time was the boundary with Derbyshire. During the Industrialisation era and the ever growing expansion of the City of Sheffield, the boundary moved further south in the late 1800s and early 1900s. The current county and city boundary is now south of Totley, near Owler Bar around 4½ miles away.

== History ==
In ancient times this area was said to be part of the Barnsdale Forest that, together with Sherwood Forest, made up the forest of the Robin Hood legends. The River Sheaf at certain times marked the fluid "boundary" between the kingdoms of Mercia and Northumbria. In fact the earliest historical record of this area refers to the defeat of the Northumbrian army to the invading West Saxon Army of Egbert of Wessex at nearby Dore in 829, although this is not proven. The area was deep within Northumbria for most of the 600 years of the kingdoms existence, which ended due to invasions by the West-Saxons of present day Southern England and soon after by the Normans.

In the late 12th century and not long after the Norman Invasion of 1066, and the Harrying of Northumbria, the Norman Lord of the manor Robert FitzRanulf gave local land to the establishment of a Norman-French abbey, just south of Millhouses at Beauchief. Over time most of the area now covered by Millhouses had been given to the abbey by the Norman-French De Ecclesall Landowners. One of their 'gifts' to the monks was the Ecclesall Corn Mill. This mill existed at least as early as 1280 and considerable remnants of it can still be seen at the north end of Millhouses Park.

Millhouses remained mostly agricultural until the 19th century, although two cutlery works had been established in the area: Moscar Wheel, which may originally have been a corn mill, was making cutlery by 1496, and Bartin Wheel was built as a cutler's wheel in 1631. In 1805 a turnpike road was built from Sheffield to Bakewell (now Abbeydale Road), this passed through the area and led to some growth, but it was only with the extension of the Midland Main Line through the valley in 1870 (with a railway station at Millhouses) and the subsequent arrival of trams in 1902 that Millhouses began to develop as an affluent residential suburb. As well as a railway station, an engine shed was built in 1901. This closed in the 1962, but the shed building is still in use as an industrial site and the shed's sidings are now Tesco supermarket's Park and Ride.

Noteworthy buildings in Millhouses include the Grade II listed parish church, Holy Trinity, which was constructed in 1937, and the former Millhouses police station building that dates from 1893. The Robin Hood and Wagon and Horses public houses are amongst the neighborhood's older surviving buildings, both dating from earlier than 1822.

== Millhouses Park ==
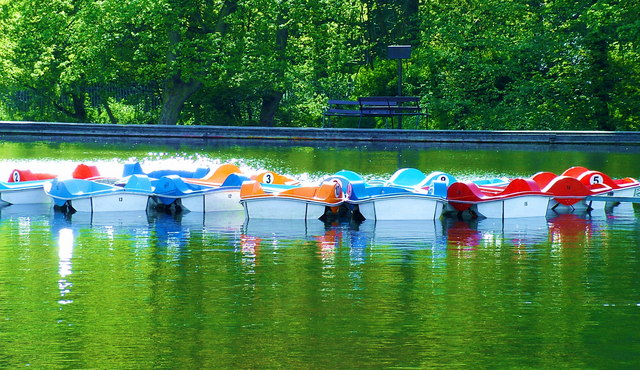
Millhouses Park Boating Lake

Between Abbeydale Road South and the River Sheaf lies a mile-long public park, with a mixture of green spaces, planted areas and leisure facilities. These include tennis courts, a boating lake and a cafe serving gourmet food.

== See also ==
- Districts of Sheffield
- Millhouses engine shed
- Millhouses & Ecclesall railway station

== References and notes ==
=== Bibliography ===
- Harvey, Peter (1996). Abbeydale and Millhouses. Stround: The Charlford Publishing Company Limited. ISBN 0-7524-0732-5.
- Vickers, J. Edward MBE (1999). Old Sheffield Town. An Historical Miscellany (2nd ed.). Sheffield: The Hallamshire Press Limited. ISBN 1-874718-44-X.
