= Millhouses and Ecclesall railway station =

Disused railway station in South Yorkshire, England

Millhouses and Ecclesall

General information
- Location: Millhouses, City of Sheffield; England
- Coordinates: 53.3450°N 1.4950°W
- Grid reference: SK337832
- Platforms: 2/4

Other information
- Status: Disused

History
- Pre-grouping: Midland Railway
- Post-grouping: LMSR; London Midland Region of British Railways

Key dates
- 1 February 1870: Opened as Ecclesall
- 1 October 1871: renamed Ecclesall and Mill Houses
- 1 May 1884: renamed Mill Houses and Ecclesall
- 1901-3: Expanded to four platforms
- 18 July 1932: renamed Millhouses and Ecclesall
- 10 June 1968: Closed
Location

Site of Millhouses and Ecclesall station shown in Sheffield

Millhouses and Ecclesall railway station was a railway station in the Millhouses district of Sheffield, South Yorkshire, England.

== History ==
The station was built by the Midland Railway and was designed by the company architect John Holloway Sanders and opened in 1870 called Ecclesall. This was changed, first to Ecclesall & Millhouses and later Mill Houses & Ecclesall, before becoming Millhouses and Ecclesall in 1932.

It was situated on the Midland Main Line between Heeley railway station and Beauchief station, and was accessed from the Archer Road overbridge, near the junction of Abbeydale Road and Millhouses Lane.

It was opened at the same time as the main line from Chesterfield with just 2 flanking platforms. Between 1901 and 1903 the line was widened and two lines added. The station now consisted of 4 platforms with two flanking platforms and an island platform in the centre. The station buildings were situated at road level with access by steps to the island platform.

The station closed on 10 June 1968, and remained derelict for many years. The station buildings and platforms were finally removed in the 1980s, but the stationmaster's house survives as a private home.

== Calls for reopening ==
There have been numerous plans to rebuild a station, going as far as a feasibility study in 1997, but so far none have come to fruition.

In July 2017, it was proposed by Local Enterprise Partnership that new stations should be built at Millhouses and Heeley as well as new platforms at Dore & Totley. The plans would be part of a call to have better links in South Yorkshire area as well as plans for a new Woodhead Route reopening. In 2020, local MP Olivia Blake wrote to the transport secretary asking him to consider the reopening of the station, suggesting it would reduce congestion in the area.

Preceding station	Historical railways	Following station
Beauchief; Line open, station closed	Midland Railway; Midland Main Line	Heeley; Line open, station closed
