= Gleadless Valley (ward) =

Electoral ward in the City of Sheffield, South Yorkshire, England

Coordinates: 53.346°N 1.455°W

- Shown within Sheffield
- Population: 21,089
- Metropolitan borough: City of Sheffield
- Metropolitan county: South Yorkshire
- Region: Yorkshire and the Humber
- Country: England
- Sovereign state: United Kingdom
- UK Parliament: Sheffield Heeley
- Councillors: Marieanne Elliot (Green Party); Paul Turpin (Green Party); Alexi Dimond (Green Party

Gleadless Valley ward—which includes the districts of Gleadless Valley (Hemsworth, Herdings), Heeley, Lowfield, and Meersbrook—is one of the 28 electoral wards in City of Sheffield, England. It is located in the southern part of the city and covers an area of 4.5 km^{2}. The population of this ward in 2011 was 21,089 people in 9,516 households. It is one of the five wards that form the Sheffield Heeley parliamentary constituency in the House of Commons. Gleadless Valley actually describes the valley that separates Hemsworth from Herdings, and is a broad area that covers several housing estates: Hemsworth, Herdings and Rollestone. Gleadless Valley is bordered by Gleadless and Norton.

== Districts of Gleadless Valley ward ==
=== Heeley ===
Heeley (grid reference SK355849) is a former village now a suburb in the south of the City of Sheffield, England. The village has existed at least since 1343, its name deriving from 'Heah Leah', meaning a high, woodland clearing. Originally Heeley was divided into three: Upper Heeley was around the intersection of Myrtle Road and Heeley Green, Middle Heeley was on the Gleadless Road at Hartley Street, and Lower Heeley was on the London Road around Artisan View. The main road through Heeley is the A61 London Road/Chesterfield Road, this dates from 1757 when it was built as a turnpike road from Sheffield to Chesterfield. A toll bar was built on this road at Heeley over the Meers Brook on what was at that time the boundary between Yorkshire and Derbyshire. The Midland Main Line railway line between Chesterfield and Sheffield, constructed in 1870, passes through Heeley where there used to be a station and carriage siding, built on the former site of Heeley Mill.

=== Hemsworth ===
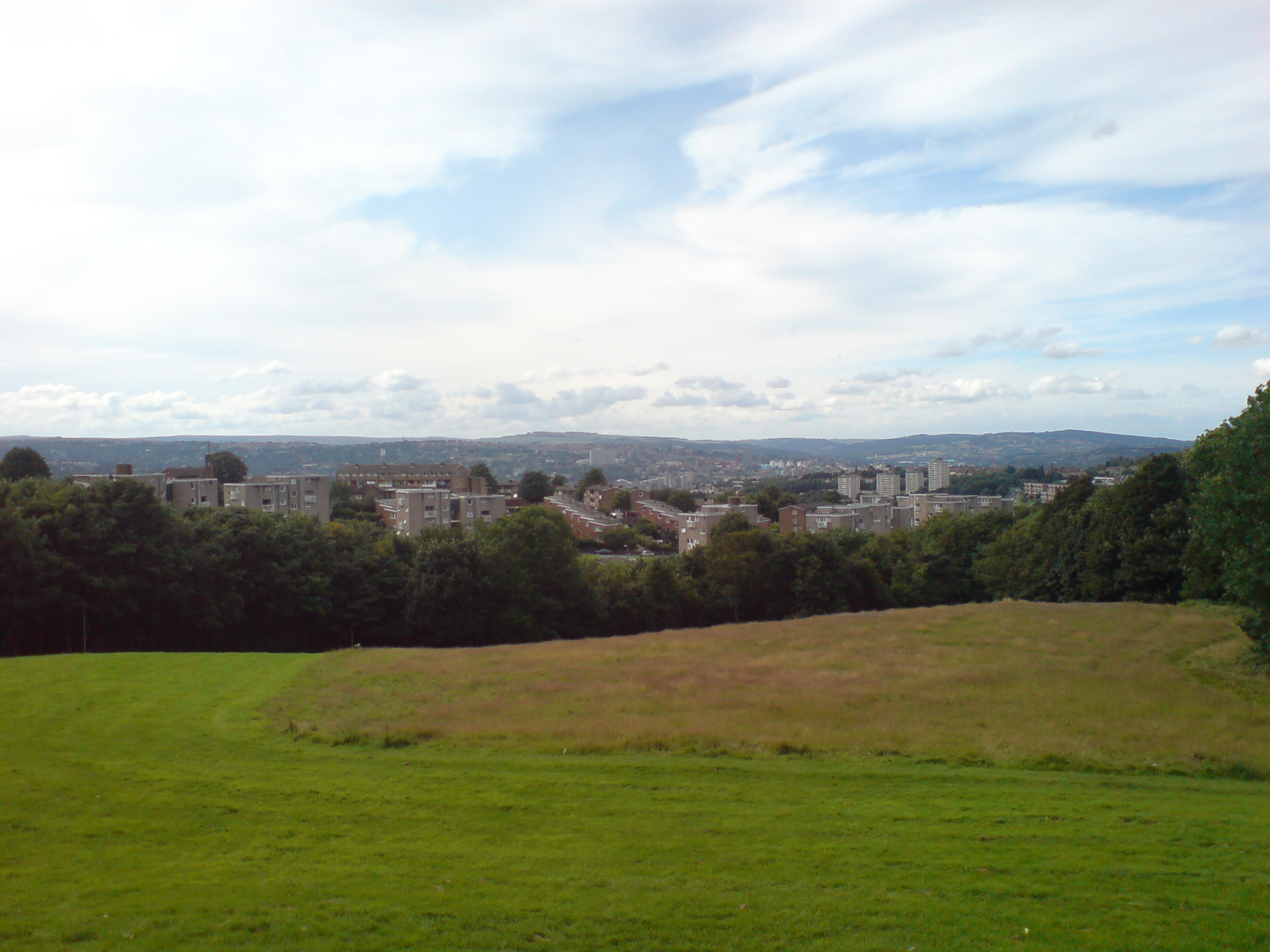
Herdings looking over the valley towards Hemsworth (Newfield Green and City also in view)

Hemsworth, Gleadless Valley (grid reference SK369831) borders with Herdings, Meersbrook, Norton and Rollestone. It's mainly accessible from Blackstock Road, the shops and a bus terminus are located off this road. To the south of Blackstock Road was the site of Hemsworth Primary School (which was demolished to be replaced with a new primary school called Valley Park, located on the former Herdings Primary School grounds). To date no development has taken place on the site of the demolished school.

Also to the South of Blackstock Road is Constable Road and Hemsworth continues down this road.

=== Herdings ===
Herdings, Gleadless Valley (grid reference SK376831) borders with Hemsworth and Gleadless. Herdings used to be the highest point in Sheffield before the expansion of the city into more Derbyshire hamlets, villages, wooded areas and open green space. At the very top of the hill now sits the Herdings high rise flats, previously known as the Three Sisters of which one was demolished.

Herdings is served by Sheffield's light rail transit, the South Yorkshire Supertram. There, the tramway terminates next to a bus terminus at Herdings Park tram stop. There is a second tram stop in Herdings at Leighton Road. Original plans which included the construction of the route to the Meadowhead roundabout were rejected after local opposition.

=== Lowfield ===
grid reference SK356854

=== Meersbrook ===
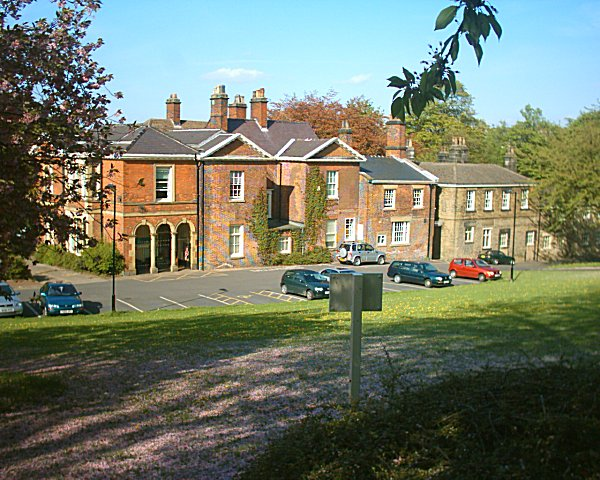
Meersbrook House

Meersbrook (grid reference SK354841) is a suburb of the City of Sheffield, England located to the south of Heeley. The name comes from the stream, the 'Meers Brook', a tributary of the River Sheaf which means 'boundary brook' and in ancient times this, along with the River Sheaf formed the boundary between the Anglo-Saxon kingdoms of Northumbria and Mercia. It remained as the boundary between Yorkshire and Derbyshire into the 20th century.

A large part of the Meersbrook area is taken up by Meersbrook Park. This park, set on a steep hillside, offers a stunning panoramic view over central Sheffield to the north. Within the park are two historic buildings: Bishops' House (c1500) is one of the oldest buildings in Sheffield and is open as a museum, and Meersbrook House. Meersbrook House was built in 1780 by Benjamin Roebuck. The property included walled kitchen garden and house's estate extended to Meers Brook. The house was the home of the Ruskin Museum until 1950. John Ruskin originally set up his museum as the Museum of St. George in 1871 at a small cottage in Walkley, but it was renamed and moved to Meersbrook House in 1890. The Ruskin collection can still be seen in Sheffield's Millennium Galleries. Although the area was still in Derbyshire the councillors in Sheffield were already looking over the border for amenity facilities for their citizens. In January 1885 Sheffield City Council bought both the house and the land as a public park or pleasure ground.

=== Gleadless Valley ===
Gleadless Valley (grid reference SK371835) is a 1950s housing estate and suburb which includes the districts of Herdings, Hemsworth and Rollestone.
