= Meersbrook =

District of Sheffield, South Yorkshire, England

Coordinates: 53.353°N 1.470°W

- Location within South Yorkshire
- Metropolitan borough: Sheffield
- Metropolitan county: South Yorkshire
- Region: Yorkshire and the Humber
- Country: England
- Sovereign state: United Kingdom
- Post town: SHEFFIELD
- Postcode district: S8
- Dialling code: 0114
- Police: South Yorkshire
- Fire: South Yorkshire
- Ambulance: Yorkshire
- UK Parliament: Sheffield Heeley

Meersbrook (grid reference SK354841) is a neighbourhood of the Heeley area in the south-west of Sheffield, England, 2 miles south of the city centre and bordered by Norton Lees to the south and the Meersbrook allotment site (the largest allotment site in Europe) to the east. Until 1950 it was part of the Sheffield Ecclesall constituency and now forms part of the Sheffield Heeley constituency. The district falls within the Gleadless Valley ward of the city. The name comes from the stream, the Meers Brook, a tributary of the River Sheaf which means 'boundary brook' and along with the River Sheaf was the boundary between Yorkshire and Derbyshire. With the expansion and industrialisation of the City of Sheffield the area immediately south of Heeley Parish which included the fields that made up present day Meersbrook, became part of Sheffield and in turn Yorkshire. Before the building of Meersbrook and growth of Heeley the area was only made up of several small farmsteads which have given many roads their names; Rush Dale, Carfield & Cliffe Field and in 1857 was known as Mears Brook. Meersbrook grew during the industrial era when it was established after the area to the south of the River Sheaf became part of the City of Sheffield.

Due to its proximity to the city centre and a thriving independent cafe, bar and restaurant culture, Meersbrook has been called 'a magnet for young professionals'. Based on 2021 census data, Meersbrook is the thirteenth least deprived of the hundred neighbourhoods in Sheffield in relation to employment, education levels, health and housing. London Road (South)/Chesterfield Road near to the neighbourhood of Meersbrook is classed as Heeley.

== History ==
Meersbrook is an attractive collection of calm, tree-lined streets sought after by families, with a variety of housing, from large villas to apartments and terraced houses. The vast majority of houses are privately owned or rented and there is very little social housing in the area. The neighbourhood is based around the eponymous park which offers a cross-sectional view of the city.

In 1868 housing was being built in Heeley on Shirebrook Road and away from Chesterfield Road towards Sheffield and the now Midland Main Line railway line. A hamlet was also growing along Derbyshire Lane and down near Smith Wood. In 1873 the land adjacent to the Meers Brook was divided between future roads and allotments with the formation of the Meersbrook Land Society. The rules for building were strict, including rules concerning the size of the allotment, the quantity of stone and all houses had to front towards the roads. No building was allowed beyond the building line and this ensured that all houses had front gardens. The rules also forbid corner shops and pubs on the south side of what was then known as the border. From 1900 gas lamps were set up. Argyle Road was built in 1902 as well as a cut through towards Upper Albert Road. In the 1930s Laver's developed the upper side of Meersbrook (behind the Coop and Post Office) using names deriving from Holly, Thorpe and House, much to the confusion of its inhabitants.

Meersbrook Park

As well as being a largely residential and previously agricultural area, The Heeley Parish and its new neighbourhood of Meersbrook was also fairly industrialised. Indeed, W May ltd Dyers & cleaners were established on London Road South and Chesterfield Road and Joseph Tyzack & Son ltd in Heeley itself. Meersbrook Works is still in use today as an enterprise centre. Tyzack built Meersbrook Works in 1876, the Tyzack logo can be seen underneath the roof top. Meersbrook Tannery ^{(see photo)} is an imposing building now divided and used by several restaurants. The back side of the building is now divided in flats called Arthington Flats.

In late 2005 the Hoyland Fox factory and the chimney was demolished, and flats were built in its stead.

Also the former Heeley Tram Depot is situated on Albert Road.

=== Meersbrook Park and Meersbrook House ===
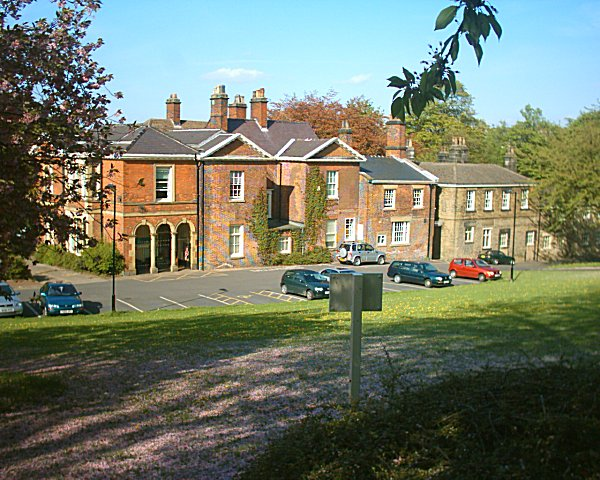
Meersbrook House

A large part of the Meersbrook area is taken up by Meersbrook Park. This park, set on a steep hillside, offers a stunning panoramic view over central Sheffield to the north. The view from this vantage point was painted by J. M. W. Turner in the 1790s. Within the park are two historic buildings: Bishops' House (c.1500) is one of the oldest buildings in Sheffield and is open as a museum, and Meersbrook House. The latter was built in 1759/60, with the details of construction shown in surveyor Fairbank's Field Books (Sheffield Archives FC FB 15–19). Benjamin Roebuck, the first owner, was a Sheffield merchant and later a partner in the town's first bank, Parker, Roebuck & Shore (1770). The property included walled kitchen garden and house's estate extended to Meers Brook. The house was the home of the Ruskin Museum until 1950. John Ruskin originally set up his museum as the Museum of St. George in 1871 at a small cottage in Walkley, but it was renamed and moved to Meersbrook House in 1890. The Ruskin collection can still be seen in Sheffield's Millennium Galleries. Although the area was still in Derbyshire the councillors in Sheffield were already looking over the border for amenity facilities for their citizens. In January 1885 the Corporation of Sheffield bought both the house and the land as a public park or pleasure ground; the house is now a Grade II listed building.

The park contains a number of amenities, such as two bowling greens, an extensive children's play area, a cricket wicket, tennis courts, basketball hoops, a skateboard bowl and a mix of undulating open spaces and woodland. It also contains a community-run walled garden which hosts a number of events throughout the year such as plant and herb sales, charity fundraisers and apple-juicing days. There is also a small museum of gardening tools housed within the walled garden.

== Schools ==
There are three well regarded primary schools that serve the local community: Meersbrook Bank Primary School, Carfield Primary School and Mundella Primary School. All three received overall "Good" ratings in their latest Ofsted inspections. All three also exceeded national expectations in the 2014 national assessments taken by pupils at the end of Key Stage Two, with Meersbrook Bank Primary School receiving some of the best results in the city (97% of pupils achieved Level 4 or above in Reading, Writing and Maths). In 2012, 2013 and 2014, 74% of GCSE students in Meersbrook achieved 5 or more A*-C grades including English and Maths, compared to a national average of 53.8% and a Sheffield average of 54%.

== Buildings of interest ==
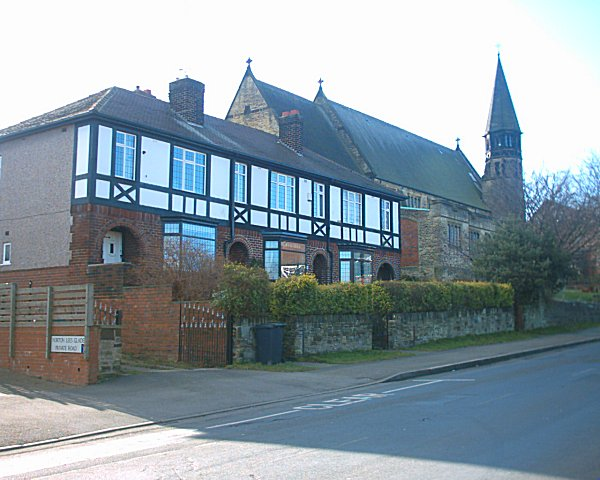
St Paul's Church

- Bishops' House, a half-timbered house, built circa 1500 lies at the south entrance to Meersbrook Park. The Blythes, operators of Blythe Wheel, lived in Bishops' House. Blythe Wheel was an undershot wheel situated where Rushdale Terrace is now. It was operated by the Blythe family and was first used to grind corn, and then as a sharpening grinding wheel. Bishops' House is owned by the City Council and managed as a museum by the Friends of Bishops' House whose volunteers open it to the public at weekends.
- Cliffefield House was a large manor house directly to the south of Meersbrook House's walled garden. Along Cliffefield House was Smithy Wood which now is below Chesterfield Road. The house was situated between Derbyshire Lane, Cliffefield Road and Norton Lees Road.
- Lees House was a 22-room house situated between Norton Lees Road, Norton Lees Lane and Beverleys Road, on the opposite side of Norton Lees Road from Meersbrook Park. The house was built in the early 18th century. The only remnant of Lees House is the stone wall opposite St Paul's Church. The house was demolished and several detached houses built called Lees House Court.

== Photos ==
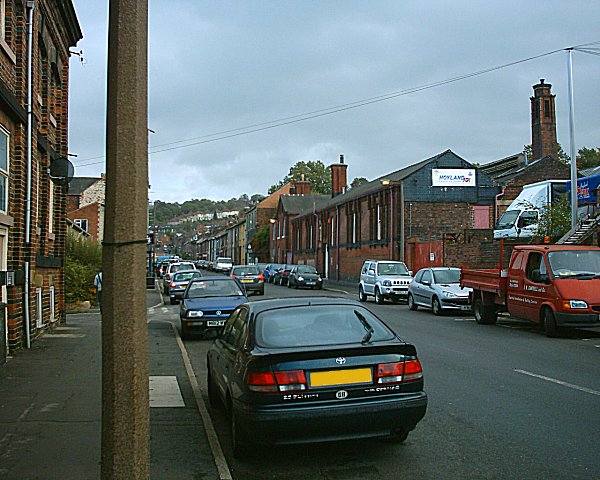
Valley Road in September 2004 with Hoyland Fox to the right

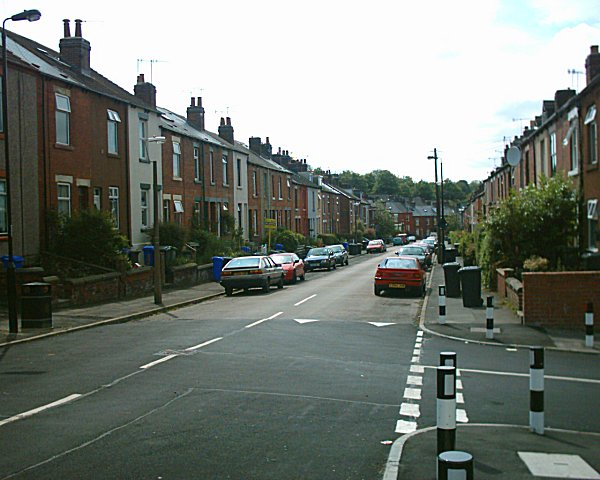
Upper Valley Road in June 2005

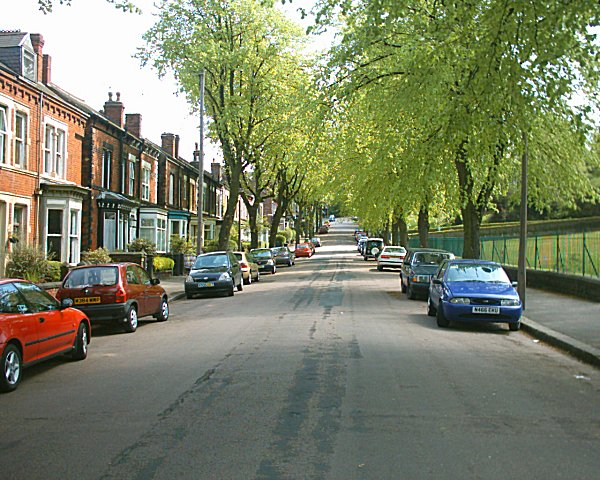
Meersbrook Park Road in May 2005, Meersbrook Park is to the right

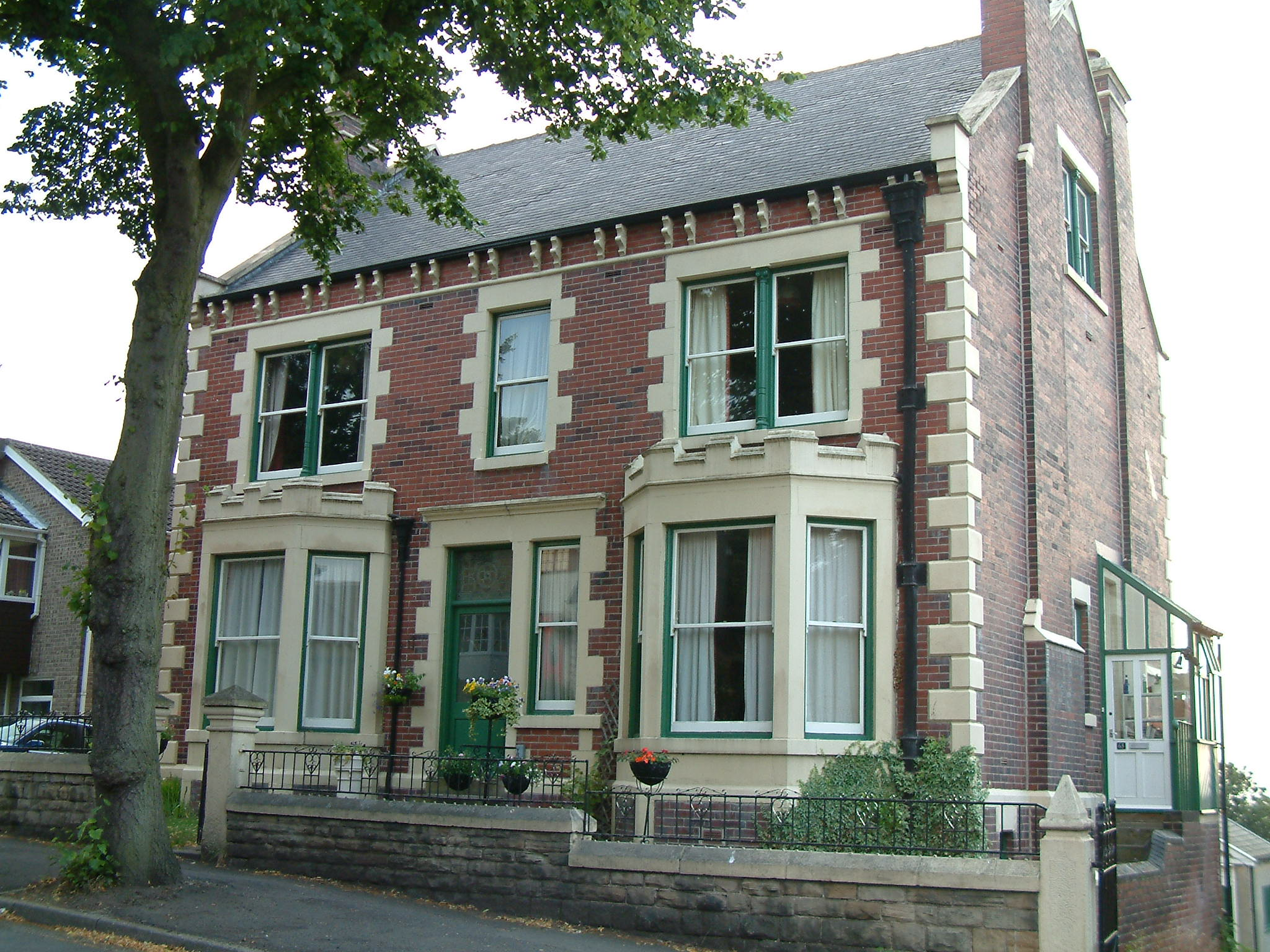
Upper Albert Road, July 2003
