= London Road (Sheffield) =

Street in Sheffield, England

Coordinates: 53.372474°N 1.476846°W

London Road is a shopping street in Sheffield, England. It leads south from the city centre near Moorfoot, parallel to Bramall Lane, through Sharrow, Highfield, Lowfield and Heeley, before becoming Chesterfield Road in Meersbrook next to The Crown Inn. Near Heeley Bridge was Heeley railway station, opposite the Bridge Inn. The road ended at Toll Bar bridge on the Meers Brook, the former boundary between Yorkshire and Derbyshire.

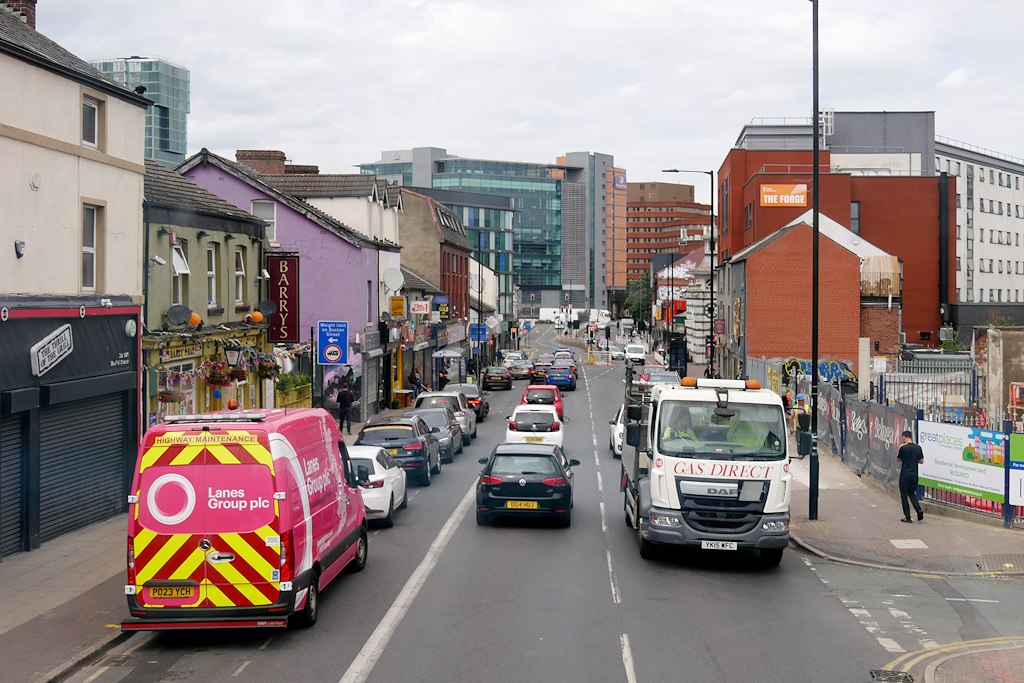
A view of the road

The street is home to a variety of pubs, shops, accommodation, a library and a former cinema which has also served as a Marks and Spencer store and a nightclub known as the "Music Factory" and "Bed", but has now been mostly demolished as part of the redevelopment works to create new retail units' on the ground floor and additional student flats on the upper floors. The 'Bed' facade was granted by the local authority as a landmark to the city and had to be retained; although the building is not listed by English heritage. It has since been restored and serves as the outer facade of a Morrisons Daily mini market.

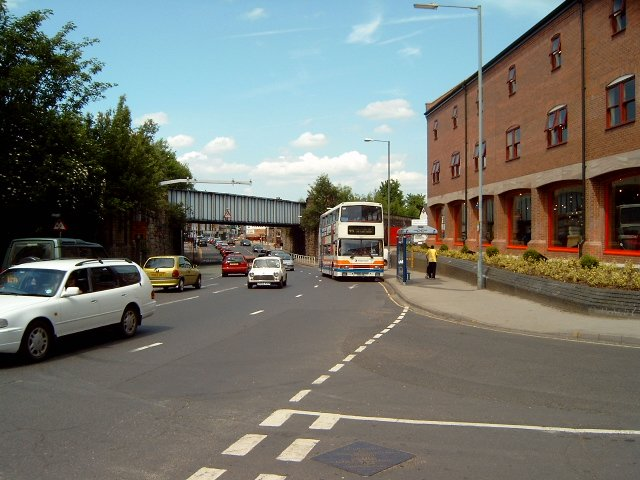
London Road South in summer 2003

It is known as one of the most multicultural areas of the city, with the northern end of the street being the centre for a sizeable Chinese community and the southern part home to numerous South Asian eateries and Polish shops and bars. The southern half of the road is part of the A61. The Chinese funded New Era Square is located near London Road.
