= Norton Lees =

Suburb of Sheffield, England

Coordinates: 53.349591°N 1.469378°W

Norton Lees shown in Sheffield

Norton Lees (grid reference SK353839) is a residential suburb in the Graves Park ward of the City of Sheffield, England located to the east of Woodseats.

== History ==
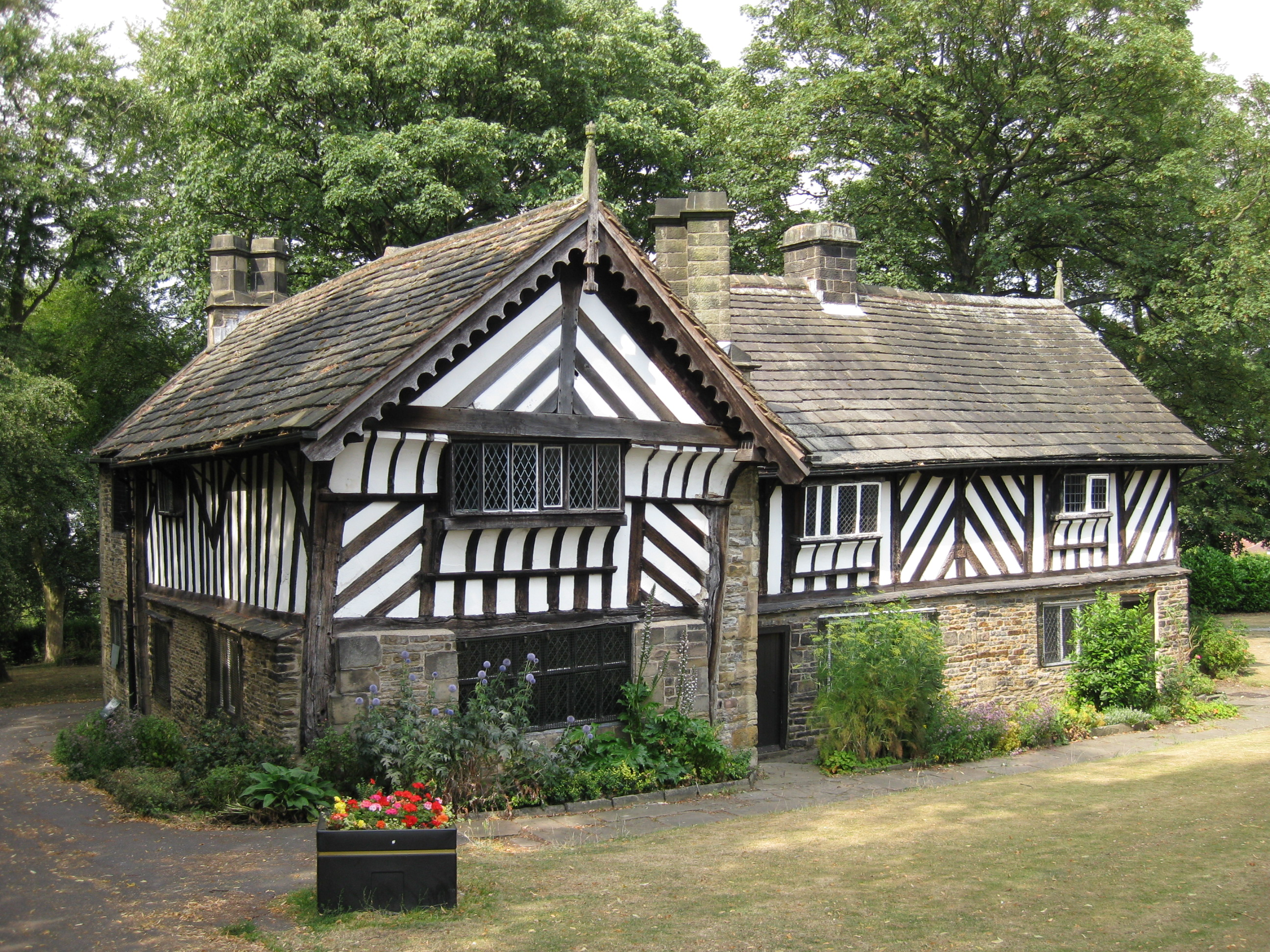
Bishops' House

In Kelly's Directory of 1891, Norton Lees is listed as a constablewick in the parish of Norton in Derbyshire. Norton parish was incorporated into Sheffield in two parts; the first in 1901 and the remainder in 1933.

Notable buildings in Norton Lees include Bishops' House—a half-timbered house that was built c. 1500—and St Paul's Church and Centre, a parish church that was originally built in 1875–7 and extended in 1935, the octagonal spire of which is visible from more than 3 miles away.

Below Newfield school is the former site of Lees Hall, built in the 15th century, but demolished by the local council in the 1950s. The orchard and other features can still be found.

== Modern development ==
Also in the area is the Thorpe House housing estate, a popular development built in the 1930s. The tree-lined roads generous sized gardens, and numerous 3 bedroom semi detached house with gardens are popular with families of all ages through to retired people.

The Brindley council housing estate also lies alongside Warminster Road, built in 1976–1977. Unlike numerous other examples of council housing, built with row after row of identical houses, this estate was built with curving roads, open communal areas and footpaths and so was popular with tenants. Many houses have converted to private ownership under the right to buy scheme.

Active8, an independent free magazine, is distributed in and around Norton Lees (and other areas of S8) every month, publicising local people, companies and community events.

== Schools ==
Schools in this area include Newfield Secondary School, recently rebuilt after many years of inadequate classrooms and facilities, and Mundella Primary School on Derbyshire Lane.

== Vista ==
Many parts of Norton Lees offer long views towards other parts of Sheffield. It is possible to see across the city centre towards Wincobank, Crookes, Hallam, and other outlying areas to the west, north and east. This is especially so in Meersbrook Park, as many of the grassy areas have unrestricted views across the city. This view was painted by JMW Turner in 1797.

== Notable residents ==
- Nick Robinson, origami artist
