= Chesterfield Road =

Chesterfield Road may refer to the following roads in England:

- Chesterfield Road (Ashford), Ashford, Kent
- Chesterfield Road (Bolsover), Bolsover, Derbyshire
- Chesterfield Road (Bristol), Bristol,
- Chesterfield Road (Dronfield), Dronfield, Derbyshire
- Chesterfield Road (Hounslow), Hounslow, London Borough of Hounslow in Greater London
- Chesterfield Road (Liverpool), Liverpool, Merseyside
- Chesterfield Road (Matlock), Matlock, Derbyshire
- Chesterfield Road (Sheffield), Sheffield, South Yorkshire
