= River Sheaf =

River in South Yorkshire, England

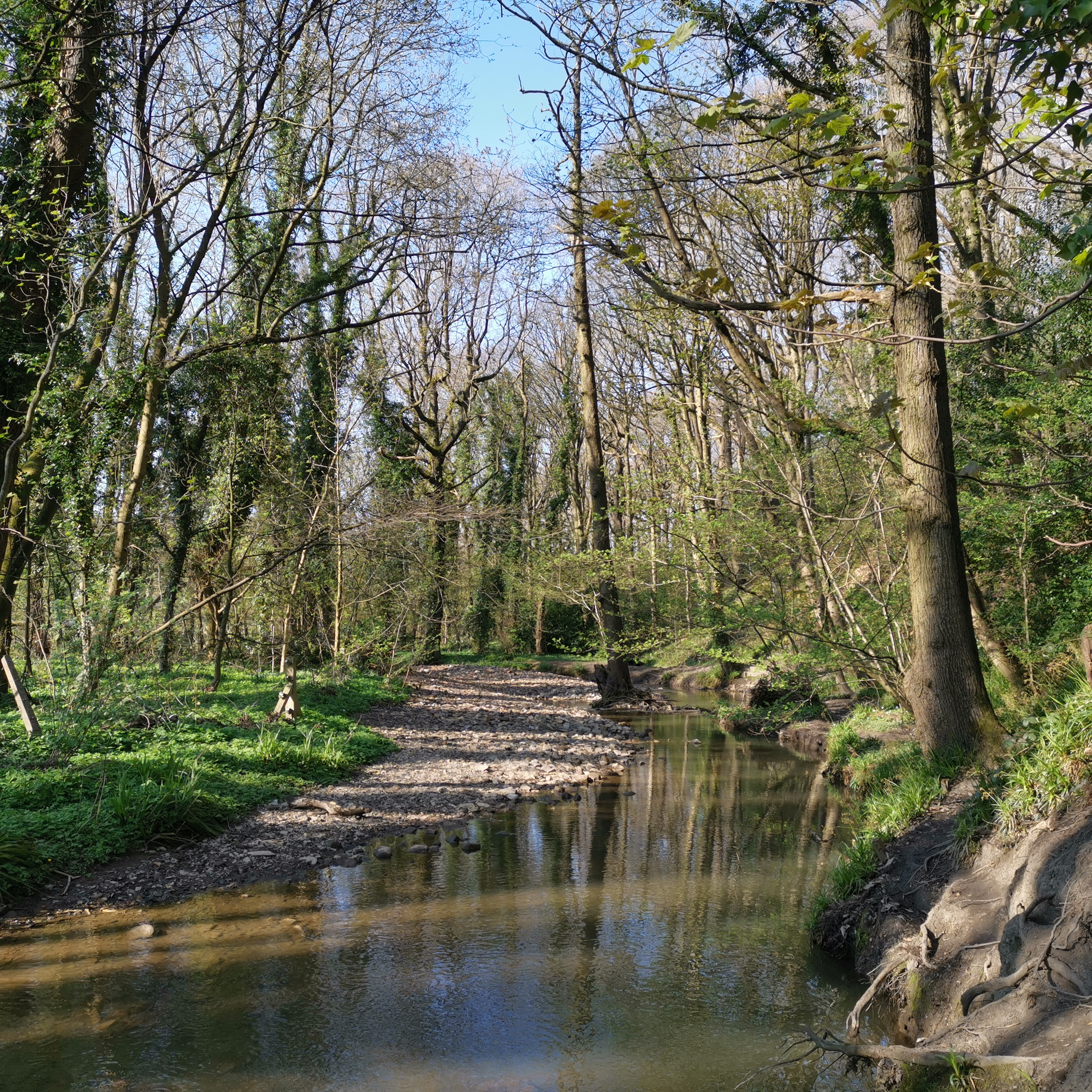
- The river running through Ladies Spring Wood

Physical characteristics
- Source: Confluence of Oldhay Brook and Totley Brook
  - coordinates: 53°19′12″N 1°31′26″W
- Mouth: River Don
  - coordinates: 53°23′07″N 1°27′44″W

The River Sheaf in Sheffield, South Yorkshire, England, flows northwards, past Dore, through Abbeydale and north of Heeley. It then passes into a culvert, through which it flows under the centre of Sheffield before joining the River Don. This lower section of the River Sheaf, together with the Don between the Blonk Street and Lady's Bridges, formed two sides of the boundary of Sheffield Castle.

The main tributaries of the Sheaf are the Porter Brook, which joins it beneath Sheffield Midland station, and the Meers Brook. The river has been polluted upstream through centuries of industrial activity, including iron and steel working, and is only slowly recovering. The river used to provide the power for metal works such as the Grade I-listed Abbeydale Industrial Hamlet.

A River Sheaf Walk has been developed which follows the river from Granville Square out to Millhouses Park and beyond to the Peak District.

== Name ==
Until the 17th century the name Sheaf was written as Scheth or Sheath. Sidney Oldall Addy equates the origins of this word with the Old English shed (as in water-shed) or sheth, which mean to divide, or separate. Historically, the Sheaf—along with its tributaries the Meers Brook and the Limb Brook—formed part of the border separating the Anglo-Saxon kingdoms of Mercia and Northumbria; it remained on the border between Yorkshire and Derbyshire into the 20th century. The city of Sheffield derives its name from the Sheaf.

== Course ==
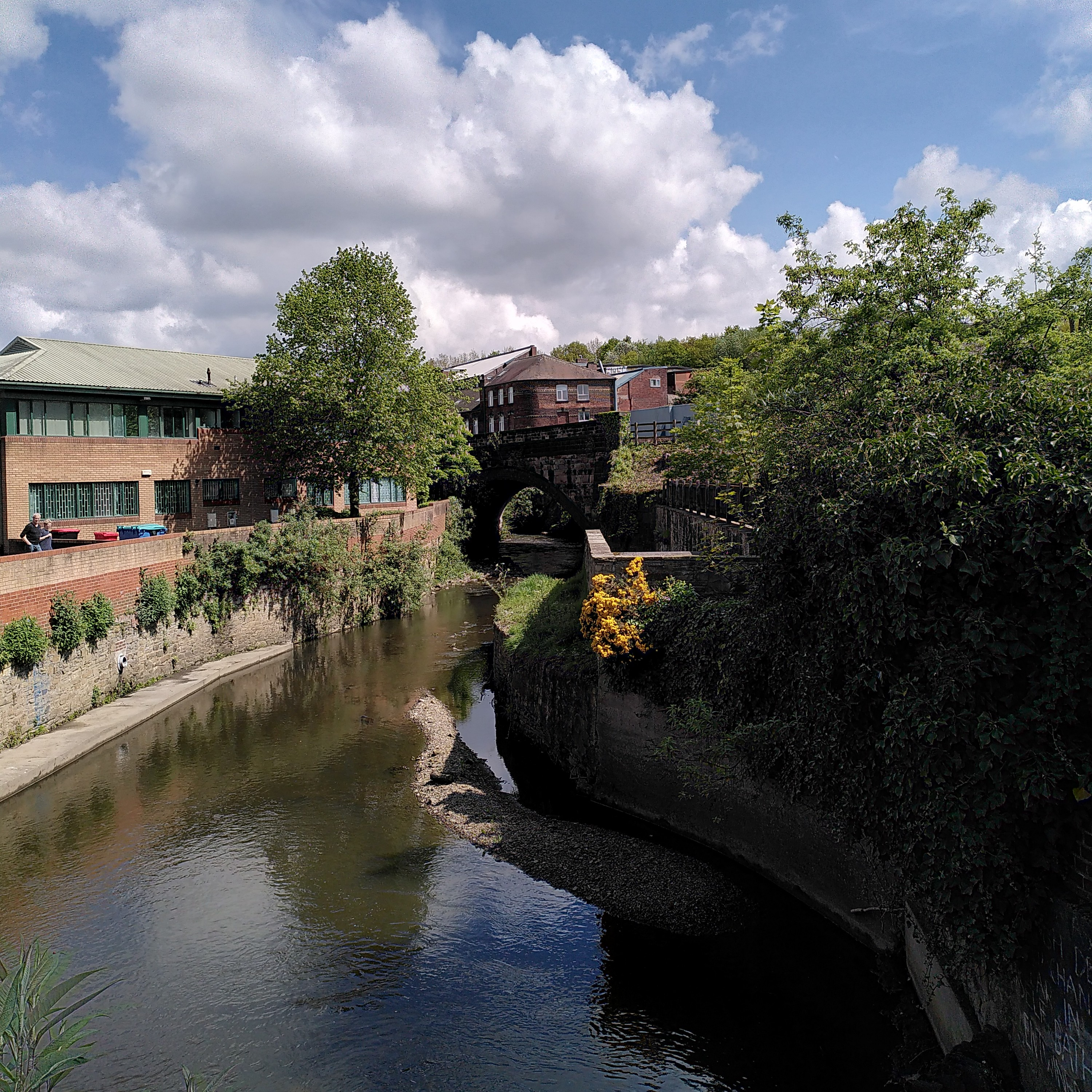
The river seen from the London Road bridge

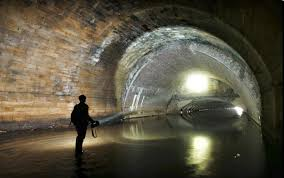
"Megatron" arch within the River Sheaf culverts, under Exchange Street

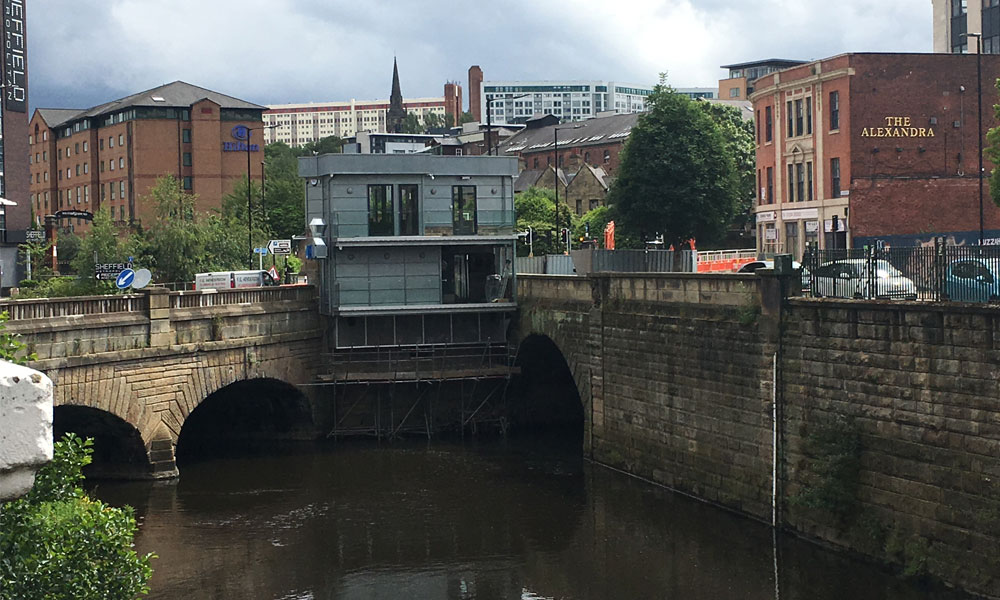
The River Sheaf emerging from its culvert (right) to join the Don by Blonk Street bridge. The Two Rivers Cafe is in the centre, a former public toilet.

The waters which form the River Sheaf rise as a series of streams on a ridge of gritstone between 6 and 7 miles (9.7 and 11.3 km) to the south west of the city centre. The Blacka Dike, Needhams Dike and Redcar Brook combine to form Oldhay Brook, while Totley Brook is joined by Rodmoor Brook, and itself joins Oldhay Brook between Totley and Dore, after which the combined flow forms the Sheaf. Immediately below the junction, the river is crossed by the Hope Valley railway line, which then joins the Midland Main Line, and both cross back over to reach Dore & Totley railway station, which was built on the site of Walk Mill in 1872. The river shares its valley with the railway, and there are a further five crossings before both reach Sheffield station.

From the junction of the Redcar Brook and the Oldhay Brook to the city centre, the river descends by around 400 feet (120 m), and this fall has resulted in it being harnessed to provide water power for a number of industries from at least the 16th century.

The river valley is broad, cutting through the underlying coal measures with its sandstones and clays, and the location of harder rock has been a major factor in where weirs and dams (a local word for the ponds used to hold water rather than the structure that creates the pond) have been located. There are some 28 sites which have well-documented and long standing mills associated with them, and a further seven were located on some of the smaller tributaries, or were more transitory in nature. The Sheaf supplied a greater variety of industry than the other Sheffield rivers, partly because of its close proximity to Derbyshire, with its mineral reserves of lead. The lead ore was brought to the area around Dore, Totley and Norton, which was then in Derbyshire. There were at least ten mills where the ore was smelted in ore hearths, which used kiln-dried wood as the heat producing agent, and water-powered bellows to produce the temperatures required. As well as the lead smelting mills, there were a variety of corn and paper mills along the river, some of which were adapted in the 18th century to service the metal trades as they grew and expanded.

Walk Mill was one of the earliest known mills on the Sheaf, having been built around 1280 by the Canons of Beauchief Abbey as a fulling mill. After the abbey was dissolved in the reign of Henry VIII, it was used as a cutlers wheel. By 1746, John Tyzack was using it for grinding scythes, in 1797 Thomas Biggin was making knives for cutting hay and straw, and it was being used as a sickle mill in 1805. After a brief spell as a paper mill around 1826, it was occupied by Thomas Tyzack and Sons, who made saws. The site was sold to the Midland Railway by the Duke of Devonshire in 1871 to enable the construction of Dore and Totley station, and the last mill buildings were taken down in 1890.

Below Walk Mill, the Limb Brook flows in from the west. Whirlow Wheel was situated on the brook, and was used for milling corn between about 1586 until 1803, when a grinding wheel was added. With the building decaying, the site was sold to Sheffield Corporation in 1935. The roof of the building collapsed in 2006, but although there were calls to demolish it, the Friends of Whirlow Wheel campaigned for it to be retained until a use could be found for the site.

Abbeydale Works is located just below the Limb Brook and was powered by two water wheels. In 1855, these were supplemented by a steam engine, but the site declined after 1900. It was given to Sheffield Corporation in 1935 as an industrial museum, and only an active campaign by members of a local history group prevented its demolition. Restoration eventually began in 1964, and in 1970 it was opened as a museum, known as Abbeydale Industrial Hamlet. The Abbey Brook then joins the river from the east, below which the river is bordered by Millhouses Park. In order to reduce flooding and pollution of the river when the sewerage system is overloaded by heavy rainfall, Yorkshire Water excavated the park in 2004/5 to construct a tank capable of holding 10,000 cubic metres (350,000 cu ft) of storm water. The decision to build a tank rather than a vertical shaft was made after test boreholes found hard rock and high groundwater pressure in the area. The project cost £7.5 million, and included three more conventional shafts further down the river, which provide an additional 3,175 cubic metres (112,100 cu ft) of storage.

Little London wheel was used for the cutlery trade from the earliest known records in 1720. By 1814 it was described as a grinding and plating forge, and later was used for the production of scythes. When the railway was constructed, it crossed part of the dam, which was reduced in size by one eighth. By 1912, the water wheels had been modernised and there were two tilt hammers in operation. The owners moved their scythe production from Abbeydale Works to Little London on 1935, and the tilt hammers continued to be water-powered until the mid-1950s. Some of the equipment was dismantled in the 1970s and taken to Beamish Museum to be restored.

The next tributary is the Meers Brook, culverted for its last section under the suburban district of Meersbrook. Just below the junction is Heeley Station, built on the site of Heeley Wheel. The mill was demolished and the river was diverted by the railway company. Other sections of the river were also re-aligned in the 1860s to make way for the railway, and the weir at the site of Cooper Wheel, which can be seen from Havelock bridge, was probably built by the Midland Railway, as its orientation changed around that time.

From Granville Square to the Don, the river is almost entirely in culverts. The Midland Railway bought the water rights to allow them to build their station over the river. The site of Pond Tilt is now occupied by the station forecourt, and the goods yard covered its dam. The owners of Pond Forge vacated their site soon after the station was built, but attempted to get compensation for loss of water power as a result of the work.

At Granville Square, a large screen prevents debris from entering the culverts. Serious flooding in 1990 led to the construction of the first screen, and it was then refurbished in 2010, so that it could be continuously monitored by the Environment Agency. The Sheaf Screen was replaced by a larger, automated version in 2020.

The river continues below ground to the edge of the station, where it is joined underground by the Porter Brook, which emerges from its own culvert to flow beside the station car park before passing under the station from the west. The two rivers meet under platform 5a, originally under a wooden access cover but the Sheaf & Porter Rivers Trust replaced this with a lightwell and information signs in 2026.

The river surfaces briefly by Pond Hill, before passing under the Ponds Forge district. It flows through a series of huge tunnels. A decaying concrete section of culvert follows until the Sheaf joins the Don under Castlegate bridge, opposite Blonk Street bridge, named after Benjamin Blonk, who was the tenant of Castle Orchards Wheel from the 1750s to the 1770s.

== Water quality ==
The Environment Agency measure water quality of the river systems in England. Each is given an overall ecological status, which may be one of five levels: high, good, moderate, poor and bad. There are several components that are used to determine this, including biological status, which looks at the quantity and varieties of invertebrates, angiosperms and fish. Chemical status, which compares the concentrations of various chemicals against known safe concentrations, is rated good or fail.

The water quality of the Sheaf was as follows in 2019:

Section	Ecological Status	Chemical Status	Length	Catchment	Channel
Sheaf from Source to River Don	Moderate	Fail	18.4 miles (29.6 km)	20.33 square miles (52.7 km^{2})	heavily modified

The river is only rated moderate for ecological status due to the fact that the channel has been heavily modified by human activity. Like most rivers in the UK, the chemical status changed from good to fail in 2019, due to the presence of polybrominated diphenyl ethers, perfluorooctane sulphonate and mercury compounds, none of which had previously been included in the assessment.

== Future ==
Sheffield City Council, the Environment Agency and Sheaf & Porter Rivers Trust worked on a vision for the former Castle Market site. This involves removing the structurally decaying concrete culvert at the end of the River Sheaf, daylighting the section and replacing it with a new city centre park. Construction to deculvert the Sheaf and create the new park began in February 2024 and is due to be completed in 2026. The Sheaf & Porter Rivers Trust are also campaigning for improvements to the River Sheaf Walk and Cycleway. This follows the course of the river for much of its length, but there are some significant gaps, and the Trust is working to ensure that the routes for the missing links are protected in the planning process.

In September 2014, Sheffield City Council announced plans for flood defences on the River Sheaf and its tributaries costing £12 million.

== Bibliography ==
- Addy, Sidney Oldall (1888). A Glossary of Words Used in the Neighbourhood of Sheffield. Including a Selection of Local Names, and Some Notices of Folk-Lore, Games, and Customs. London: Trubner & Co. for the English Dialect Society.
- Ball, Christine; Crossley, David; Flavell, Neville (2006). Water Power on the Sheffield Rivers: Second Edition. South Yorkshire Industrial History Society. ISBN 978-0-9556644-0-3.
