= Woodseats =

District of Sheffield, South Yorkshire, England

Coordinates: 53.345°N 1.475°W

- Location within South Yorkshire
- OS grid reference: SK351833
- Metropolitan borough: Sheffield
- Metropolitan county: South Yorkshire
- Region: Yorkshire and the Humber
- Country: England
- Sovereign state: United Kingdom
- Post town: Sheffield
- Postcode district: S8
- Dialling code: 0114
- Police: South Yorkshire
- Fire: South Yorkshire
- Ambulance: Yorkshire
- UK Parliament: Sheffield Heeley

Woodseats is a district of Sheffield, South Yorkshire, England in the Graves Park ward. Historically, Norton Woodseats (grid reference SK347833) was a village that straddled Derbyshire Lane running from Four Lane Ends to Bolehill (now part of Graves Park), originally in Derbyshire but, since 1901, part of the City of Sheffield.

The name Woodseats comes from the Old English Wodesettes, which means a 'fold in a wood'. Nether Woodseats itself was little more than a cluster of cottages around a road called 'The Dale' close to the intersection of Woodseats Road and Chesterfield Road (A61) and Upper Woodseats, near the Abbey Lane and Chesterfield Road junction.

== Schools ==
There are two schools in the Woodseats area: Abbey Lane Primary School and Woodseats Primary School.

== Public houses ==
=== Current public houses ===
There are a number of public houses on Chesterfield Road:

- Sport Shack, Chesterfield Road, was formerly a Greggs bakery and a charity shop. The building has had a dramatic transformation to become Woodseats' first sports bar. The brand owned by Daniel Grayson and James Dobson operate two other venues in Sheffield, in Hillsborough and Ecclesall Road.
- The Woodseats Palace, Chesterfield Road, was formerly a cinema, opened in 1911. The building later housed various supermarkets (Fine Fare, Kwik Save, Alldays) and is now a Wetherspoons Free House.
- The Chantrey Arms, Chesterfield Road, named after sculptor Sir Francis Chantrey who was born nearby in Norton.
- The Big Tree, Chesterfield Road, was once the Masons Arms but was renamed in 1936 after the large tree which grew in front of the building. Ironically, by the time the name had been changed the tree in question had been pulled down, reputedly by an elephant from a touring circus that had been tethered to it. A new tree was planted in its place that lasted until the 1980s when it blew down after becoming diseased, after which it too was replaced. The pub's past links are shown by masonic symbols inlaid into the floor but these are now covered by carpets. The pub was known as Brewburgers for a short period in the 1980s.
- The Abbey, Chesterfield Road, features a trapezoidal bowling green and is one of the last pubs in Sheffield to retain its bowling facilities.

=== Former public houses ===
- The Woodseats Hotel, Chesterfield Road, made the national news when Firkin Brewery changed its name to the Floozey and Firkin. The Woodseats Hotel closed in 2010 and was converted into a restaurant, operating as the Viraaj.

== Public transport ==
First	
24	Lowedges - Meadowhead - Woodseats - Heeley - City - Manor Park - Stradbroke - Woodhouse
75/75a	Jordanthorpe - Batemoor - Meadowhead - Woodseats - City Centre - Pitsmoor - Firvale (Northern General Hospital) - Firth Park - Shiregreen - Ecclesfield (75) - Chapeltown (75) - High Green (75)
76/76a/76e	Lowedges - Greenhill - Woodseats - City Centre - Pitsmoor - Firvale (Northern General Hospital) - Firth Park - Wincobank - Meadowhall

Stagecoach	
25	Bradway - Lowedges - Meadowhead - Woodseats - Heeley - City - Manor Park - Stradbroke - Woodhouse
43/43a, 44	City Centre - Woodseats - Lowedges (43a), Coal Aston (44/44a) - Dronfield Woodhouse (43) - Dronfield Sheepbridge (44) - Chesterfield (43/44)
X17 Gold	City Centre - Woodseats - Whittington Moor - Chesterfield - Boythorpe - Walton - Holymoorside - Stone Edge - Kelstedge - Matlock

== Cinemas ==
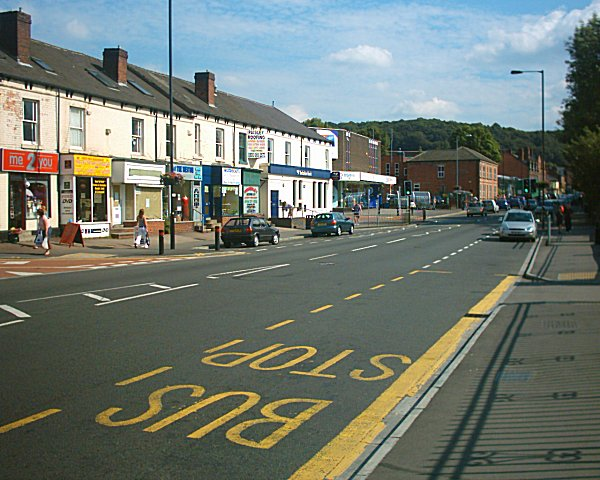
Chesterfield Road in Woodseats

Woodseats once boasted two cinemas but neither of these are still in existence.

The Woodseats Palace on Chesterfield Road opened in 1911 and closed sometime in the late 1950s. The building subsequently became a supermarket under various names until it was eventually bought by the Wetherspoons chain and is now The Woodseats Palace public house.

The Chantrey Picture House, also on Chesterfield Road, was subsequently used as offices for a number of years by the construction company Gleesons.

== Churches ==
Churches in Woodseats include St Chad's Parish Church, Woodseats Evangelical Church, The Well at Woodseats and Woodseats Methodist Church.

=== Our Lady of Beauchief and St Thomas of Canterbury ===
A Roman Catholic church at the boundary of Woodseats and Meadowhead, Our Lady of St Thomas was founded at the request of local Catholics who had been meeting at the Big Tree public house due to the lack of a suitable church in the area. The first building was erected in 1910 and remained as a temporary structure until the existing building was erected and opened in 1932.

=== St Chad's Church ===
St Chad's is on Linden Avenue. The first stone of the building was laid on 3 August 1911. The nave and aisles were built first and the church was consecrated on 25 July 1912, costing £5,100. The chancel, vestries and organ were added in 1933 and cost £4,460. The original design of the building was modelled on 14th century English designs and is the only Anglican church designed by the Catholic architects Hadfield & Hadfield. The church was built using local rubble for the walls, Bath stone for the window tracery and nave arcade, and Westmorland slates for the roof.

The vicarage was built in 1914 for £1,800 and is one of the last large vicarages to be built.

== Other notable buildings ==
Other places of note include the Double Six Youth Club and Woodseats Scout Unit.

=== The Roddick Building ===
==== Woodseats Medical Centre, Woodseats Library, Lloyds Pharmacy ====
Opening in 2017, The Roddick Building is built on the site of the old Woodseats Library. Built as a community hub by the owners of the Medical Centre, it houses both the Public Library on the ground floor, the Medical Centre on the second floor and offices related to the Medical Centre on the third floor. There is also a Lloyds Pharmacy attached next to the main entrance.

The building is step free access, with the Library being on the bottom floor, and with two lifts serving the Medical Centre, there are two Disabled Parking bays but the rest of the parking is for staff only.

=== Woodseats Police Station ===
A station which used to have an incident desk, Woodseats Police Station lost this amenity in the mid-2000s. The station is staffed, but has no public access. It is the base for the Sheffield South West Policing Team.

== Sport ==
Woodseats is currently represented by two football teams; Woodseats FC and Woodseats B FC. Both currently compete in the Sheffield & District Fair Play League.

== Parks ==
Graves Park is situated around the area. Trees rise up on the hillside and the park is home to two playgrounds, tennis courts, golf course, animal farm, waterfall wood, and a large waterfall.

== In popular culture ==
In the 1977 film The Price of Coal, a reference is made to a militant colliery at Woodseats where the officials are Communists and would not endorse a visit by royalty. In fact, there was no colliery at Woodseats at the time.
