= St Paul's Church and Centre, Norton Lees, Sheffield =

Church in South Yorkshire, England

Coordinates: 53.350°N 1.473°W

St Paul's Church, Norton Lees, Sheffield
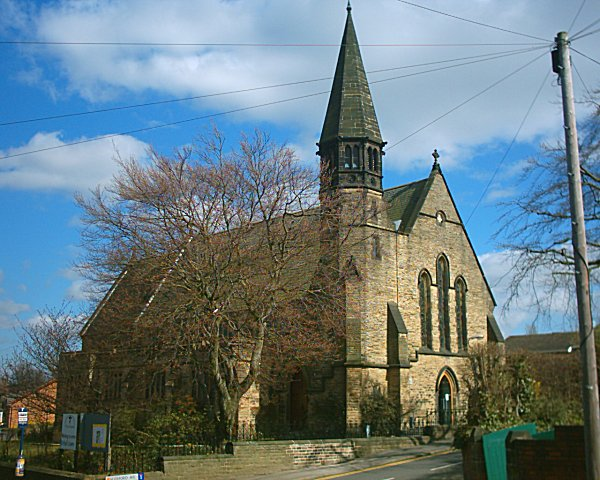
- St Paul's Church, Norton Lees, Sheffield
- St Paul's Church, Norton Lees, Sheffield
- Denomination: Church of England
- Churchmanship: Broad Church
- Website: www.stpaulschurchandcentre.org

History
- Dedication: St Paul

Architecture
- Completed: 1877

Administration
- Province: York
- Diocese: Sheffield
- Parish: Norton Lees

Clergy
- Priest: Revd Jon Hidden

St Paul's Church and Centre is a Parish Church in the Church of England Diocese of Sheffield located at the junction of Norton Lees Lane and Angerford Avenue, just above Meersbrook Park. For postal purposes the address is Angerford Avenue, Sheffield S8 9BG

Originally built between 1875 and 1877, St Paul's was much altered to meet the needs of an expanding congregation in 1935 when C. B. Flockton added broad North and South aisles. The most recent phase of redevelopment was undertaken in 2006–7 when the church pews were removed and replaced with modern chairs, and other rooms, such as the vestry, were modernised for use as community rooms.
