= Graves Park =

Park in Sheffield, England

Coordinates: 53.3359°N 1.4702°W

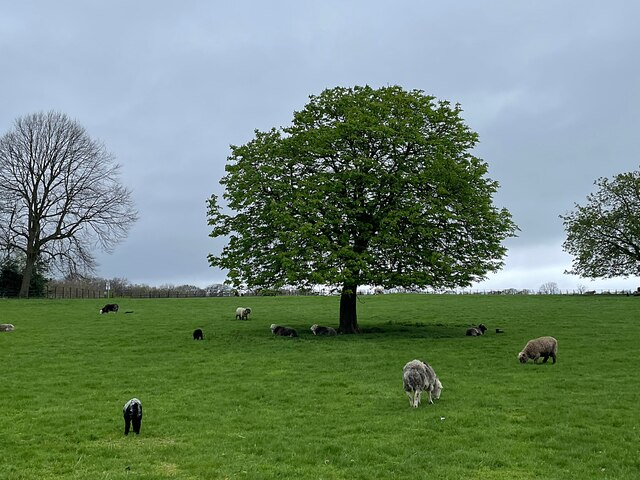
Graves Park

Graves Park is a large parkland area in the South of Sheffield, between the districts of Norton, Woodseats and Meadowhead. The park was developed by Alderman J. G. Graves between 1926 and 1936, to protect the thousand year old woodland from building development. Mr Graves donated the 100.362 hectares (248 acres) park to the city.

The park is a mixture of open and woodland, with several streams flowing through it. There are three small lakes bordered by mature trees. To the north-east of the park is the animal farm, home of many rare breeds of cattle, pigs, chickens and donkeys.

Near the Charles Ashmore Road entrance are a practice golf course, two bowling greens and several hard tennis courts.

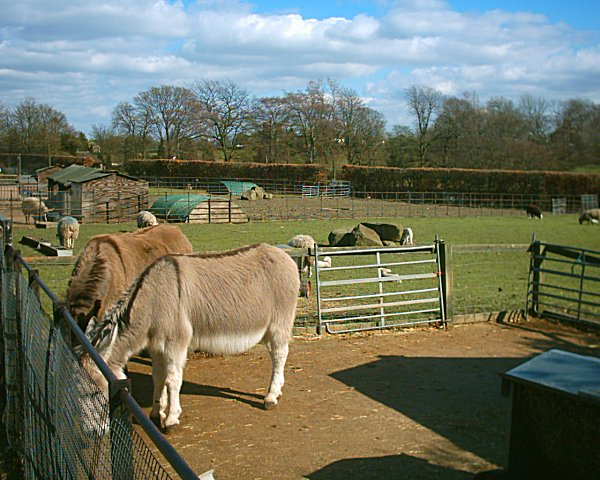
Graves Park Animal Farm

At the north side of the park (Derbyshire Lane entrance) there is a large open area which has 2 cricket pitches and around 10 football pitches. The football pitches are regularly used by the public, particularly on Sundays for the Sheffield and District Junior Sunday League.

The park is managed by a charitable trust owned wholly by Sheffield Council. In recent times however, the council has been criticised by the Charity Commission over its management of the park.
