= Meersbrook Park =

Park in Meersbrook, Sheffield, England

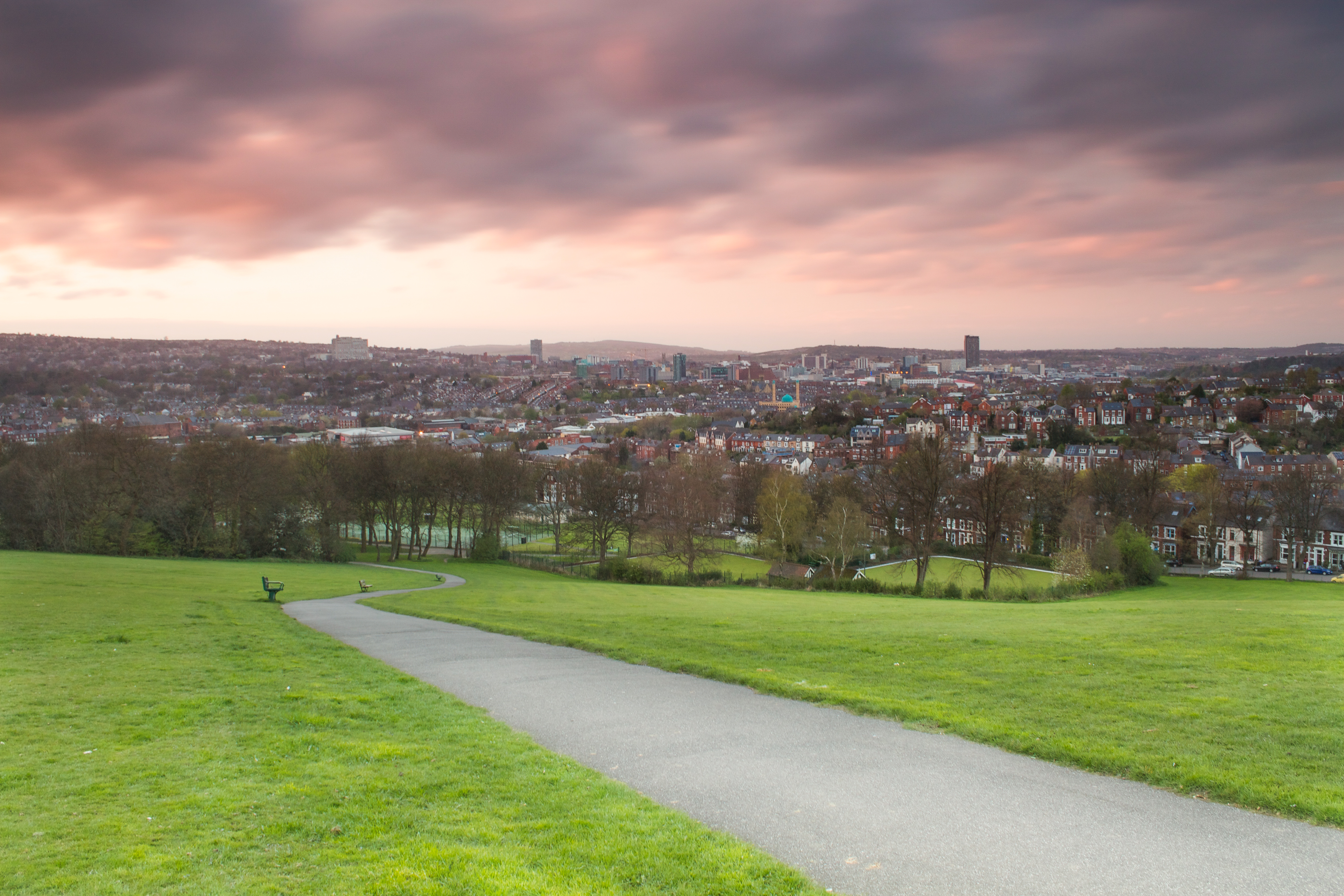
- Sheffield city centre from Meersbrook Park.
- Interactive map of Meersbrook Park
- Type: Public park
- Location: Meersbrook, Sheffield
- Coordinates: 53.354°N 1.474°W
- Created: 1885
- Status: All year

Meersbrook Park is set on a steep hillside in Meersbrook, Sheffield, England, offering panoramic views over central Sheffield to the north. Within the park are two historic buildings: Bishops' House and Meersbrook Hall.

== The Bishops' House ==
One of the oldest buildings in Sheffield, is a timber-framed building built around 1580. Originally owned by the Blythe family, it passed out of Blythe ownership in the 18th century, probably into the hands of Benjamin Roebuck, and the house and fields were let out to tenant farmers. The house was included in the sale of the Meersbrook estate to Sheffield Corporation in 1885. The Parks Authority continued to use Bishops House as a dwelling house following the purchase, housing 2 separate families of park employees until the 1970s. It is a Grade II* listed building and has been open as a museum since 1976. In April 2011 a voluntary organisation, Friends of Bishops' House, took over management of public opening of the house on behalf of Sheffield City Council who have continued to maintain the building. It now hosts community events and is a licensed wedding venue.

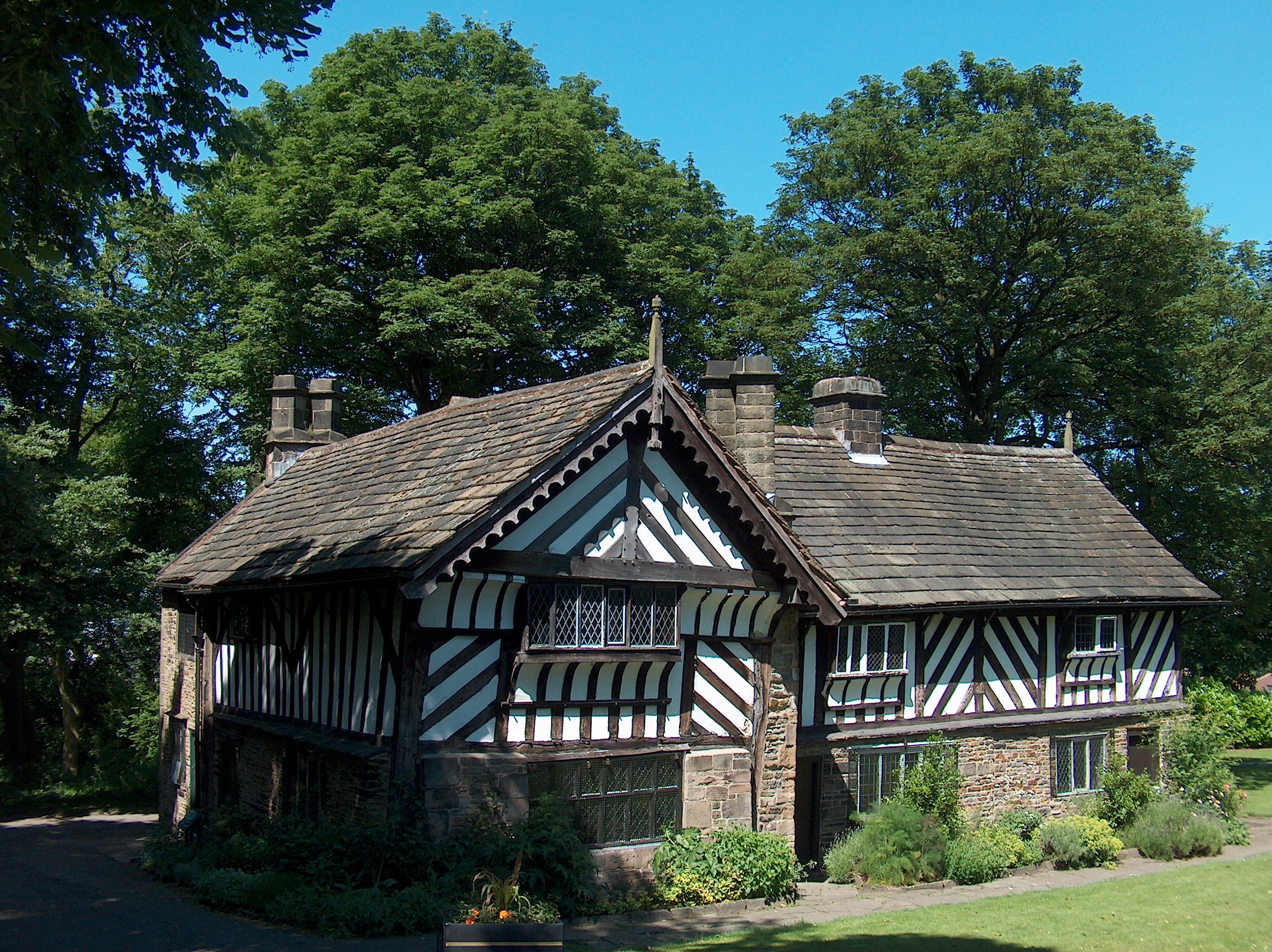
Bishops House

== Meersbrook Hall ==
Was built in 1780 by Benjamin Roebuck. The property included a walled kitchen garden and house's estate extended to Meers Brook. The house was the home of the Ruskin Museum until 1950. John Ruskin originally set up his museum as the Museum of St George in 1871 at a small cottage in Walkley, but it was renamed and moved to Meersbrook House in 1890. The Ruskin collection can now be seen in Sheffield's Millennium Galleries. Although the area was still in Derbyshire, the councillors in Sheffield were already looking over the border for amenity facilities for their citizens. In January 1885, Sheffield City Council bought both the house and the land as a public park or pleasure ground. The house is now a Grade II listed building. Meersbrook Hall was used as council offices for several years until 2016, when it was taken over by the Heeley Trust in partnership with Friends of Meersbrook Hall. It now hosts Sheffield Online and various community projects and events including Adult Learning and Wellbeing Classes.
