= Heeley City Farm =

City farm in Sheffield, England

Coordinates: 53°21′47″N 1°28′05″W

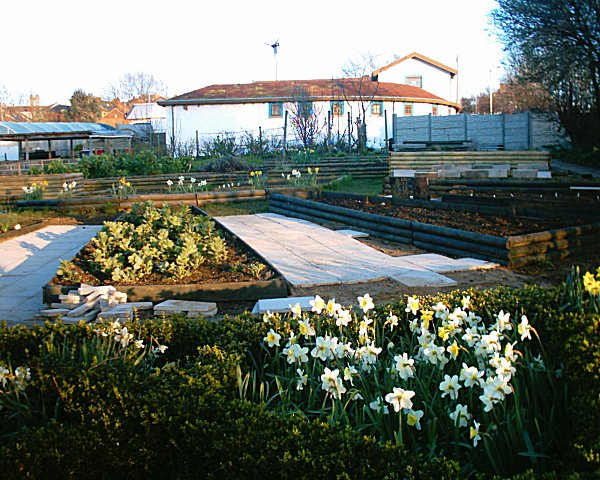
the farm buildings.

Heeley City Farm is a city farm in the district of Heeley, Sheffield, South Yorkshire, England. It is a community-based and led training, employment and youth enterprise.

Heeley City Farm was founded in 1981 on land where the Sheffield South Relief road —commonly called the Heeley bypass, a scheme which blighted the lives of hundreds of local residents for 30 years— was to be built. Construction never started and the land was put to new use.

Heeley City Farm includes a wind and sun powered mini-farm and a number of environmental social enterprises and attractions. The focus of its work is in Heeley but increasingly it operates throughout Sheffield and into the South Yorkshire region, including work at Wortley walled garden, Dore and Meersbrook. Now over 25 years old and winner of several national and international awards, Heeley City Farm provides environmental, health, food and farming education to around 5,000 school children and several thousands adult visitors each year. The South Yorkshire Energy Centre (SYEC), which opened in August 2006, demonstrates renewable energy and sustainable building materials and techniques and provides advice and courses for building professionals, individual householders and school parties.

Heeley City Farm maintains a much needed green space in inner suburban Sheffield with recycling, healthy living facilities, a garden centre, cafe, and charity shop. Day care and training for up to 20 adults with learning difficulties is provided along with vocational training in horticulture for up to 100 unemployed adults, youth activities for up to 2,000 young people (including young people not attending school) and support for over 100 regular volunteers.

Heeley City Farm describes itself as a community or social enterprise; it is committed to supporting those most in need in its community using enterprising methods. It runs training programmes (including language and Basic Skills support) and creates jobs (by developing mini enterprises). Emphasis is placed on long term unemployed adults, people with learning disabilities and those suffering disadvantage or discrimination in achieving skills and employment and young people.

Income comes mostly from social enterprise activity including public sector service contracts, enterprise sales and consultancy services. In 2005, less than 25% of income was described as funding but this included charitable funding and grants for specific projects or activities.

The farm recently began a programme named "Digging our Roots" that teaches young people about British archaeological heritage. Part of this project has featured the reconstruction of an Iron Age Roundhouse, which began on 31 October 2008 and is due to be completed in early 2011. The University of Sheffield's Archaeological Department and student-run Archaeological Society are involved in the project and has been used as part of an Experimental Archaeological study.
