= A61 road =

Road in England

Coordinates: 53.56713°N 1.47182°W

A61

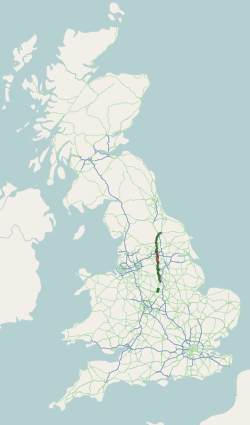

Route information
- Length: 110.0 mi (177.0 km)

Major junctions
- From: A52 in Derby
- A38 in Derby; A57 in Sheffield; M1 near Hoyland M621 in Leeds; A59 in Harrogate A1(M) near Rainton

- To: A19 / A168 near Thirsk

Location
- Country: United Kingdom
- Counties: Derbyshire; South Yorkshire; West Yorkshire; North Yorkshire
- Primary destinations: Alfreton; Chesterfield; Dronfield; Sheffield; Barnsley; Staincross; Wakefield; Leeds; Harrogate; Ripon

Road network
- Roads in the United Kingdom; Motorways; A and B road zones
← A60	→ A62

The A61 is a major trunk road in England connecting Derby and Thirsk in North Yorkshire by way of Alfreton, Clay Cross, Chesterfield, Sheffield, Barnsley, Wakefield, Leeds, Harrogate and Ripon. The road is closely paralleled by the M1 motorway between Derby and Leeds.

== Route ==
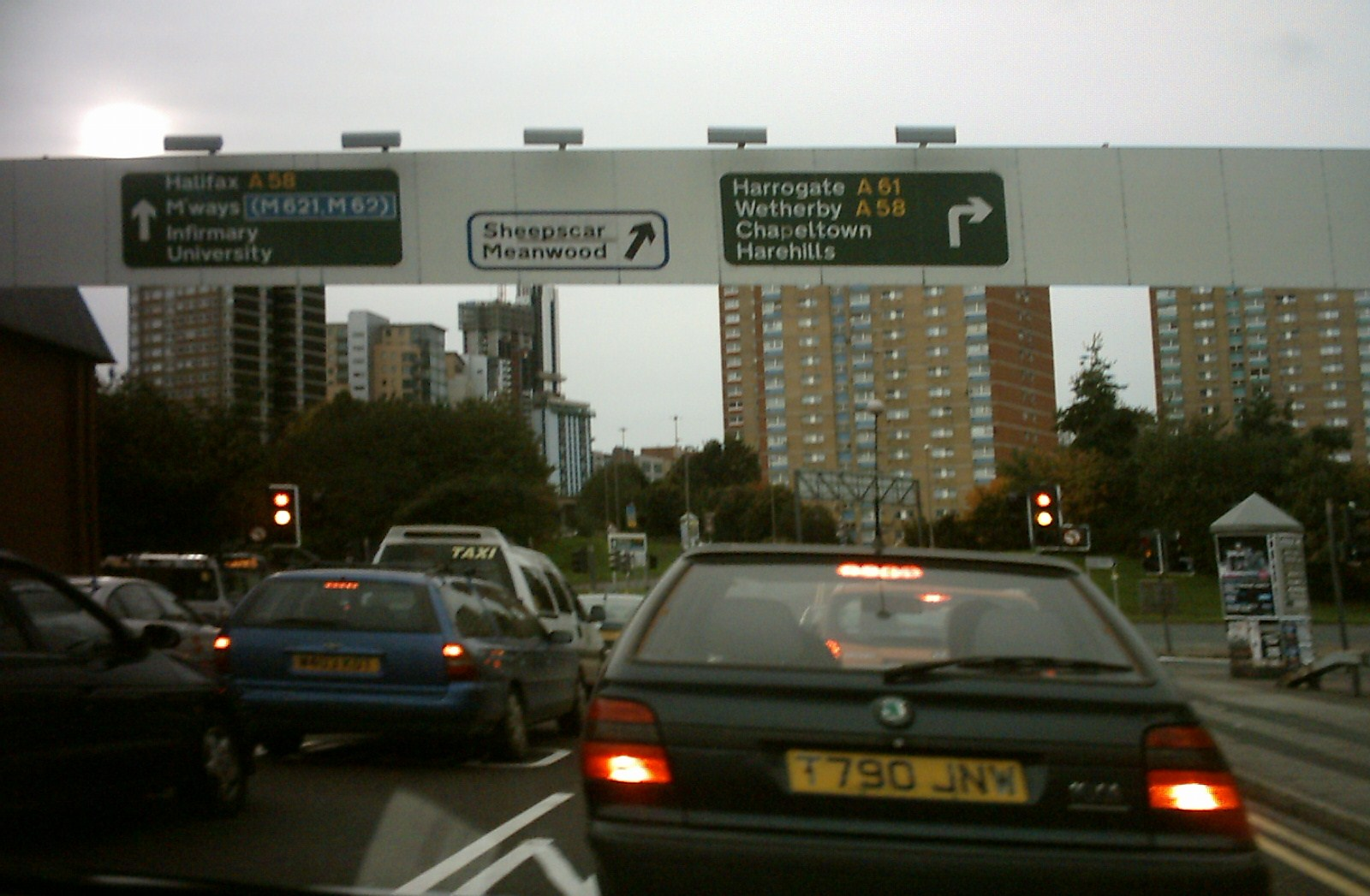
The A61 at the Sheepscar Interchange (its interchange with the A58 and the Leeds Inner Ring Road), in Sheepscar, Leeds.

Heading south, the road begins as single carriageway from Thirsk which bypasses Ripon on a stretch of road opened in 1996 at a cost of £16 million, and travels towards Harrogate, eventually passing through Harrogate town centre. Here, the road divides into two major one-way streets which enclose the town centre and run along The Stray, a 200-acre (0.81 km^{2}) stretch of grassland in Harrogate. As Leeds Road, it then passes through the southern suburbs of Harrogate before meeting the A658 near the village of Pannal. The A61 continues through Harewood before approaching the north's metropolis, where a sudden urban fringe approaches. As the road enters Leeds and crosses the A6120 outer ring road, the road becomes Scott Hall Road, a main dual carriageway (or Trunk Road) and artery for north Leeds. There are sections of guided bus route using kerb guidance near Potternewton. Here, the A61 rises slightly, and a panoramic view of Leeds skyline is revealed. The descent into Leeds is quick and the road soon turns into a multi-lane road, as it approaches Sheepscar Interchange. Fast-flowing traffic is directed onto the A61, although some traffic is directed off the A61 to avoid Leeds City Centre as it routes around the back of Quarry House. The A61 meets it shortly after, as it shares the city centre loop for a short distance. After crossing the river, the road splits again before taking traffic out to the motorways. The road then continues out of Leeds towards Wakefield and Barnsley. South of Barnsley it crosses the M1 at Junction 36 then heads towards Sheffield. Between the M1 at Junction 36 and the Westwood roundabout intersection with the A616, the road is designated as a trunk road under the responsibility of National Highways.

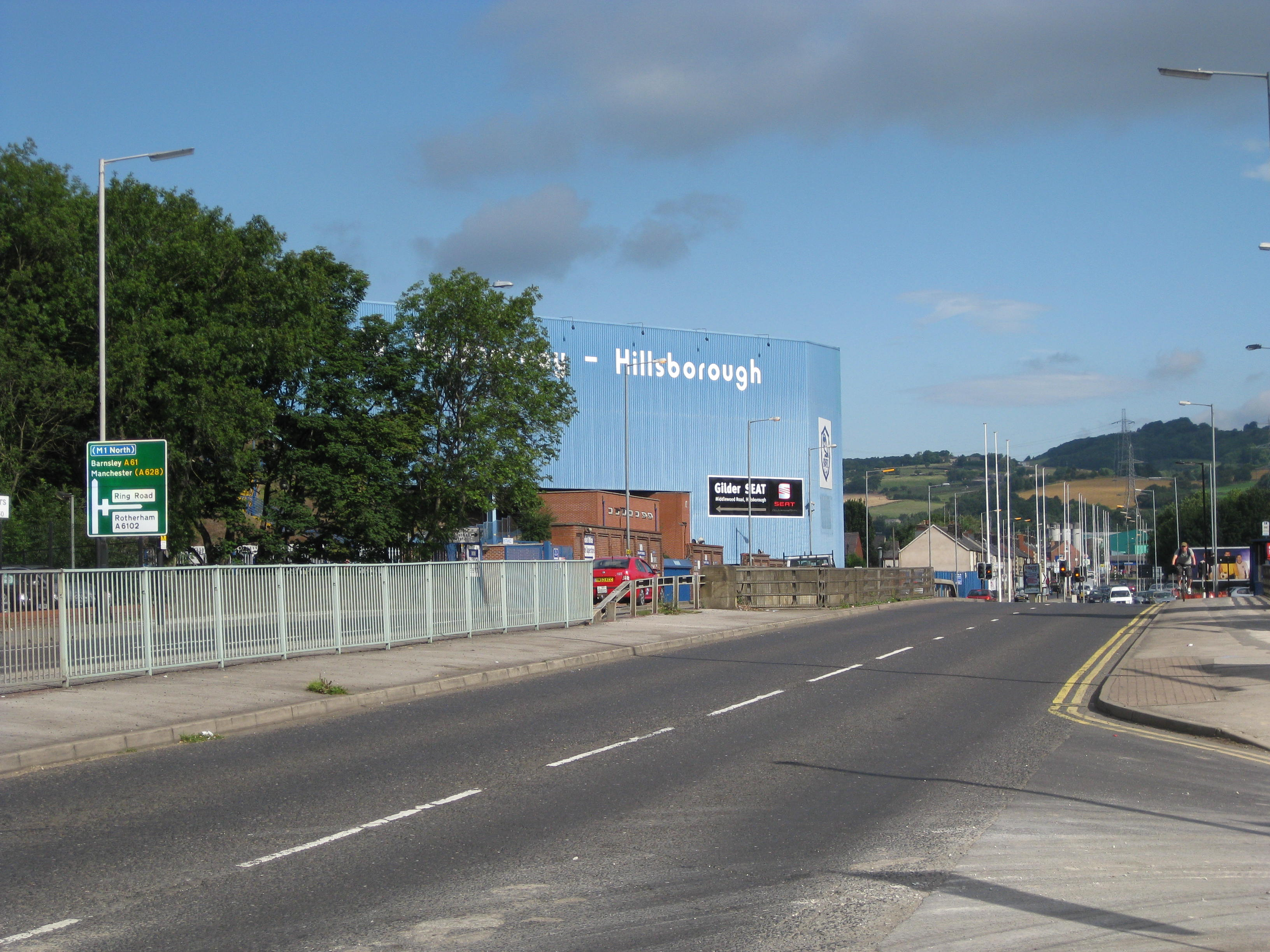
Northwards past Sheffield Wednesday Hillsborough Stadium

The A61 travels into Sheffield through Grenoside and Hillsborough, passing next to the Sheffield Wednesday football stadium as Penistone Road. It continues down to Shalesmoor and at this point it forms a major artery into the City Centre from the north, becoming the Sheffield Inner Ring Road (which is labelled as A61 all the way around). It meets the A57 twice; at Park Square and Brookhill roundabout. At Junction 4 (Bramall Lane) of the Sheffield Inner Ring Road, is a spur road the A621 – Bramall Lane, this road takes you past the western side of Sheffield United's stadium and back onto the A61 as Queens Road. The A621 is used as a shortcut, instead of continuing on the Sheffield Inner Ring Road to Junction 3 (Granville Square), where it meets Queens Road further north. The A61 then continues through Heeley as Chesterfield Road and climbs up to Norton and onto Bowshaw roundabout. Between Sheffield and Chesterfield it is a dual carriageway, avoids Dronfield and Unstone as the eponymous by-pass. The road used to go through Chesterfield town centre, passing by the famous crooked spire, but was heavily congested. This was alleviated by the construction of the Chesterfield bypass in the 1980s on the alignment of the former Great Central Railway. The road reverts to single carriageway south of Chesterfield, passing through Clay Cross and Alfreton.

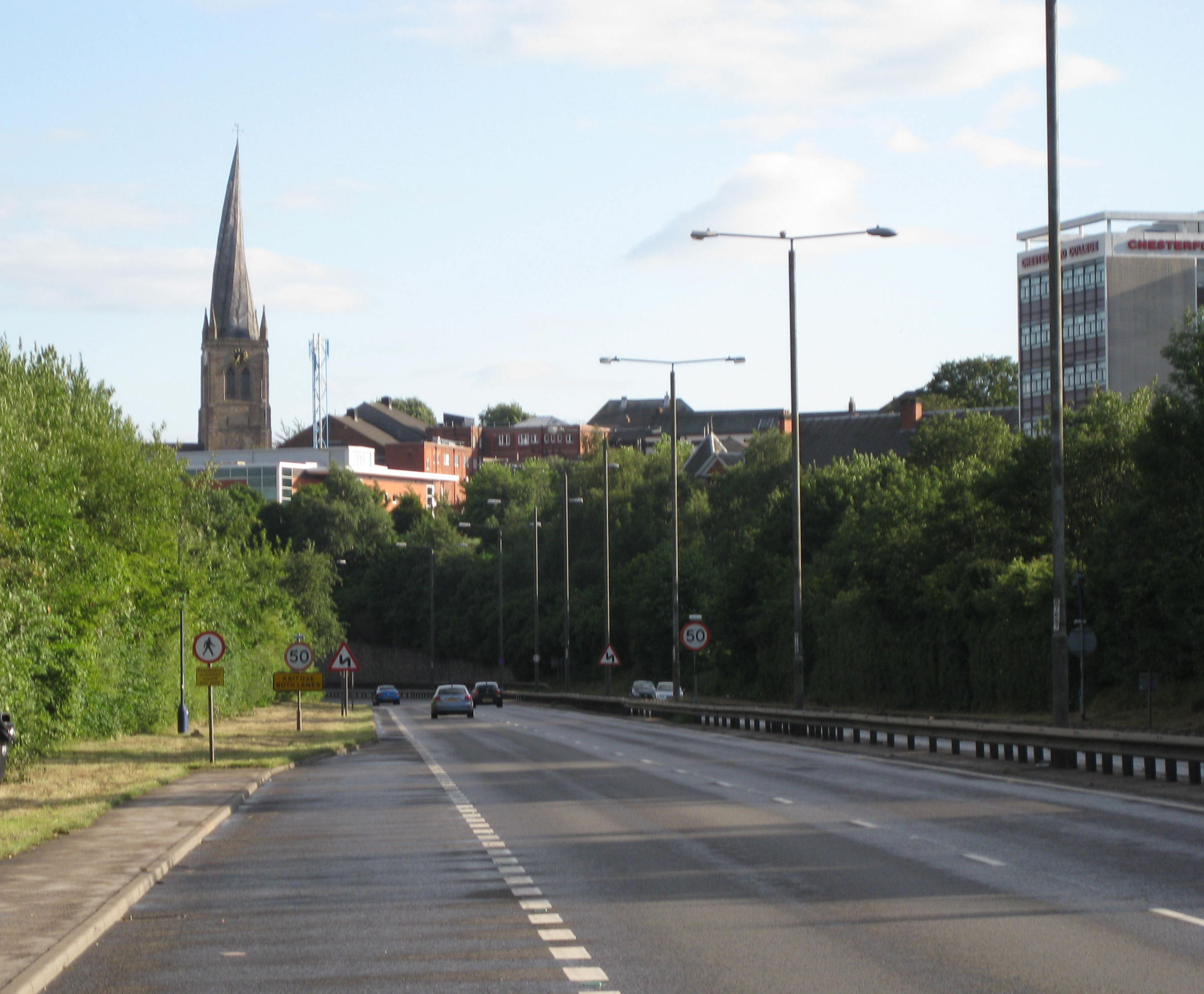
Southwards past Chesterfield

South of Alfreton, the A61 merges with the dual carriageway A38, but the old A61 continues as the B6179 through Swanwick and Denby, meeting the A38 again just north of the city. The A61 road continues towards the city centre along Sir Frank Whittle Road until it finally ends at the junction with the A52 near to the headquarters of Derbyshire County Cricket Club.

== Road safety ==
In June 2008 a 6.2-mile (10.0 km) stretch of the A61 between Barnsley and Wakefield was named as the most dangerous road in Britain, when motorcycle accidents were excluded. In the latest EuroRAP findings from the Road Safety Foundation, this stretch of road was also found to be the most dangerous road in Yorkshire and Humber. With 22 fatal and serious injury accidents in the three years analysed (2004–2006), this single carriageway route was rated as Red – the second highest risk category.

== Junction list ==
County	Location	mi	km	Destinations	Notes
Derbyshire	Derby	0.0	0.0	A52 / Nottingham Road to M1 / A6 – City centre, Nottingham, Loughborough, Chaddesden	Southern terminus
Derbyshire	Derby	0.8	1.3	A608 northeast (Mansfield Road) / Hampshire Road to A609 – Heanor, Ilkeston, Oakwood, Chester Green	Southwestern terminus of A608
Derbyshire	Derby	2.2	3.5	A38 south (Abbey Hill) / B6179 (Alfreton Road) / A6 – Birmingham, Burton, Matlock, Little Eaton	B6179 and Little Eaton signed northbound only; southern terminus of A38 concurrency
Derbyshire	Horsley– Holbrook boundary	4.9– 5.5	7.9– 8.9	B6179 to A609 – Kilburn, Belper, Little Eaton	Junction; Little Eaton signed southbound only
Derbyshire	Ripley	9.3– 10.0	15.0– 16.1	A610 / A6 / B6441 – Ambergate, Matlock, Nottingham, Ripley	Junction; To A6, Ambergate and Matlock signed northbound only, Nottingham southbound only
Derbyshire	Swanwick– Alfreton boundary	12.1– 12.3	19.5– 19.8	A38 north to M1 – The North, Sheffield, Mansfield, South Normanton, Sutton-in-Ashfield; B6179 (Derby Road) – Swanwick	The North and Sheffield signed northbound only, S Normnton and Sutton southbound only; northern terminus of A38 concurrency
Derbyshire	Alfreton	12.4– 12.6	20.0– 20.3	A615 northwest to B5035 – Matlock, South Wingfield, Crich	Information signed northbound only; southeastern terminus of A615
Derbyshire	Clay Cross	18.2	29.3	A6175 northeast to M1 – Heath	Information signed southbound only; southwestern terminus of A6175
Derbyshire	Chesterfield	22.9	36.9	A617 east / A619 west to M1 / A6 / A632 – Town centre, Mansfield, Bakewell, Buxton, Bolsover	To A6, A632, Buxton and Bulsover signed northbound only; southern terminus of A619 concurrency; western terminus of A617
Derbyshire	Chesterfield	23.1– 23.3	37.2– 37.5	A632 – Chesterfield, Matlock, Bolsover	Junction; southbound exit and northbound entrance
Derbyshire	Chesterfield	24.4	39.3	A619 east (Rother Way) / Lockoford Road to M1 north – Town centre, Worksop, Birmingham, Staveley	Northern terminus of A619 concurrency
Derbyshire	Chesterfield	26.0– 26.5	41.8– 42.6	Unstone, Dronfield, Sheepbridge	Junction; Sheepbridge signed northbound only
South Yorkshire	Sheffield	30.8	49.6	A6102 north (Ring Road) / B6054 (Greenhill Parkway) / M1 / M18 / A630 / A6178 – Holmesfield, Rotherham, Meadowhall, Bradway, Beauchief, Greenhill, Lowedges, Gleadless, Norton	Beauchief signed northbound only; southern terminus of A6102
South Yorkshire	Sheffield	33.7	54.2	A621 southwest (Wolseley Road) – Bakewell; B6388 (London Road) – Barnsley	No access from A61 north to A621 southwest, from A61 south to B6388, or from A621 northeast to A61 south; southern terminus of A621 concurrency
South Yorkshire	Sheffield	33.8	54.4	A621 northeast (Bramall Lane) – City centre, Barnsley; B6388 (Myrtle Road) – Gleadless	No access from A61 south to A621 northeast or from A61 north to B6388; northern terminus of A621 concurrency
South Yorkshire	Sheffield	34.6	55.7	A61 north (Ring Road) – Barnsley; Granville Road (A6135 south) – Manor Top	Manor Top signed southbound only; southern terminus of A6135 concurrency
South Yorkshire	Sheffield	35.7	57.5	A57 east (Sheffield Parkway) to M1 / M18 / A630 / A6102 – Worksop, Rotherham, Meadowhall	Southern terminus of A57 concurrency
South Yorkshire	Sheffield	36.0– 36.2	57.9– 58.3	A6109 northeast / A6135 north (Saville Street) – Rotherham, Chapeltown, Lower Don Valley, Attercliffe, Burngreave, Meadowhall	Meadowhall signed southbound only; northern terminus of A6135 concurrency; southwestern terminus of A6109
South Yorkshire	Sheffield	36.8	59.2	A57 west / A61 south (Ring Road) – Chesterfield, Glossop	Northern terminus of A57 concurrency
South Yorkshire	Sheffield	38.1	61.3	A6101 west to A57 – Stannington, Loxley, Glossop, Walkley	To A57, Glossop and Walkley signed southbound only; eastern terminus of A6101
South Yorkshire	Sheffield	38.5– 38.9	62.0– 62.6	A6102 – Stocksbridge, Rotherham, Meadowhall	Stocksbridge signed northbound only, Meadowhall southbound only; brief concurrency
South Yorkshire	High Green	43.0	69.2	A629 north to A616 – Huddersfield, Manchester	To A616 and Manchester signed northbound only; southern terminus of A629
South Yorkshire	Tankersley	44.4	71.5	A616 to M1 south / A628 – Manchester	
South Yorkshire	Tankersley	45.5	73.2	M1 – The South, The North, Leeds, Barnsley, Sheffield	The North and The South signed southbound only, Barnsley northbound only; M1 junction 36
South Yorkshire	Tankersley	45.7	73.5	A6195 north (Dearne Valley Parkway) / A6135 south (Olympus Parkway) – Doncaster, Hoyland, Chapeltown	Chapeltown signed southbound only; southern terminus of A6195; northern terminus of A6135
South Yorkshire	Barnsley	49.5	79.7	Park Road / Cemetery Road (A6133) to M1 / A1(M) / A628 / A635 – Manchester, Doncaster	
South Yorkshire	Barnsley	49.7	80.0	A635 east (Taylor Row) – Doncaster, Rotherham	No access from A61 north to A635 east; southern terminus of A635 concurrency
South Yorkshire	Barnsley	49.8	80.1	A628 west (West Way) to M1 – Manchester	Southern terminus of A628 concurrency
South Yorkshire	Barnsley	50.0– 50.1	80.5– 80.6	A628 east – Pontefract	Junction; information signed northbound only; northern terminus of A628 concurrency
South Yorkshire	Barnsley	50.5	81.3	A635 west (Old Mill Lane) – Town centre, Huddersfield	A635 and H'field signed northbound only; northern terminus of A635 concurrency
South Yorkshire	Barnsley	51.8	83.4	A633 southeast (Rotherham Road) – Rotherham, Monk Bretton	Monk Bretton signed southbound only; northwestern terminus of A633
West Yorkshire	Wakefield	57.4	92.4	A6186 west (Standbridge Lane) to M1 / A636 – Denby Dale	A6186 signed southbound only; eastern terminus of A6186
West Yorkshire	Wakefield	59.4	95.6	A638 east (Doncaster Road) to M62 east / A645 – Doncaster, Pontefract	No access from A61 north to A638 east; southern terminus of A638 concurrency
West Yorkshire	Wakefield	59.6– 59.7	95.9– 96.1	A638 west (Ings Road) to M1 / A642 – Dewsbury, Huddersfield	Northern terminus of A638 concurrency
West Yorkshire	Wakefield	60.2	96.9	A642 east to M62 east – Stanley, Rothwell	Southern terminus of A642 concurrency
West Yorkshire	Wakefield	60.6	97.5	Northgate (A642 west) – City centre	Northern terminus of A642 concurrency
West Yorkshire	Wakefield	61.0	98.2	Bradford Road (A650 east) / Link Road to A642 – Huddersfield	Information signed southbound only; southern terminus of A650 concurrency
West Yorkshire	Wakefield	61.2	98.5	A650 west / Bar Lane (A6194 south) to M1 / M62 – Bradford, Morley, Doncaster, Rothwell, Stanley	Stanley signed southbound only; northern terminus of A650 concurrency
West Yorkshire	Robin Hood	64.8	104.3	Leadwell Lane (A654)	
West Yorkshire	Leeds	66.3– 67.1	106.7– 108.0	M621 east to M1 / M62 – The South, Wakefield, Hull A639 (Wakefield Road) to M1 / A1 – The North, Pontefract, Leeds, Stourton	Leeds signed northbound only, To A1, Wakefield and Hull signed southbound only; southern terminus of M621 concurrency; M621 junction 7
West Yorkshire	Leeds	67.7	109.0	Middleton	Southbound exit and northbound entrance; M621 junction 6
West Yorkshire	Leeds	68.0– 68.7	109.4– 110.6	M621 west to M62 west – City centre, The West, Manchester	M621 and Manchester signed northbound only, To M62, City centre and The West southbound only; northern terminus of M621 concurrency; M621 junction 5
West Yorkshire	Leeds	69.0– 69.4	111.0– 111.7	A639 southeast – Pontefract, Rothwell	Junction; northwestern terminus of A639
West Yorkshire	Leeds	69.6	112.0	A63 east (Long Causeway) to M1 / A64 – The North, Selby, York	Western terminus of A63
West Yorkshire	Leeds	70.0– 70.3	112.7– 113.1	A653 (Crown Point Road) to M621 / M1 / M62 / A64 / A63 – City centre, Dewsbury, Wakefield, York, Selby, Quarry Hill	To M621, M1, M62 and City centre signed northbound only, To A63 and Selby signed southbound only
West Yorkshire	Leeds	71.1– 71.3	114.4– 114.7	A58 (Clay Pit Lane / Barrack Road) to M621 / M62 / A1 – The North, Halifax, Wetherby, Harehills, Roundhay, Chapeltown	Chapeltown signed northbound only
West Yorkshire	Leeds	74.3	119.6	A6120 (Ring Road) to M1 / M62 / A1(M) / A58 / A64 / A660 / A647 – Wetherby, York, Skipton, Bradford	
West Yorkshire	Harewood	78.3	126.0	A659 east (The Avenue) to A58 – Tadcaster, Wetherby, Collingham	Southern terminus of A659 concurrency
West Yorkshire	Harewood	79.4	127.8	A659 west (Otley Road) – Otley, Pool, Arthington	Northern terminus of A659 concurrency
West Yorkshire– North Yorkshire boundary	Harewood– Kirkby Overblow boundary	97.6	157.1	Harewood Bridge over River Wharfe	
North Yorkshire	Kirkby Overblow	82.4	132.6	A658 / A1(M) / A59 – The North, York, Bradford, Knaresborough, Boroughbridge, Pool, Otley, Ripon	Boroughbridge and Ripon signed northbound only
North Yorkshire	Harrogate	85.4	137.4	A6040 northeast (York Place) / B6162 (Otley Road) to A661 / A59 – Wetherby, York, Harlow Hill	B6162 signed southbound only; southwestern terminus of A6040
North Yorkshire	Harrogate	86.9	139.9	A59 (Skipton Road) to A661 – Skipton, York, Wetherby	
North Yorkshire	Ripon	97.7	157.2	A6108 north / Sharow Lane – Ripon, Masham, Leyburn, Sharow, Copt Hewick	Southern terminus of A6108
North Yorkshire	Hutton Conyers– Baldersby boundary	101.1	162.7	A1(M) – The North, The South A6055 north (Leeming Lane) – Bedale, Masham	Bedale and Masham signed northbound only; southern terminus of A6055; A1(M) junction 50
North Yorkshire	Carlton Miniott– Sandhutton boundary	105.2	169.3	A167 – Northallerton, Topcliffe, Sandhutton, South Otterington, Dalton, Boroughbridge	
North Yorkshire	Thirsk	108.8	175.1	A170 to A19 / A1(M) / A168 / B1448 – York, Scarborough, Wetherby, Sowerby	To A1(M), A168, B1448, Wetherby and Sowerby signed southbound only
North Yorkshire	South Kilvington	110.0	177.0	A19 / A168 / B1448 – Teesside, York, Wetherby, Sowerby, Northallerton	Northern terminus
1.000 mi = 1.609 km; 1.000 km = 0.621 mi
