= Chesterfield Road (Sheffield) =

Street in Sheffield, England

Coordinates: 53.34961°N 1.48074°W

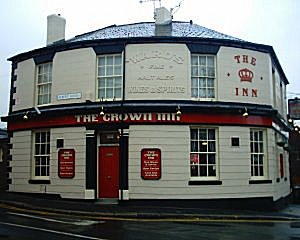
The Crown Inn at the corner of Albert and Chesterfield Road.

Chesterfield Road is a shopping street in Sheffield, England. It leads south from the suburb of Meersbrook to Woodseats, before becoming Meadowhead at the Abbey Lane junction, next to the Abbey pub. The road starts at Toll Bar bridge on the Meers Brook, the former boundary between Yorkshire and Derbyshire. There the road changes name from London Road to Chesterfield Road.

The first building on Chesterfield Road (although bearing an Albert Road house number) is the Crown Inn.

The street is home to a variety of pubs and shops, cafés and restaurants.

The road forms part of the A61. Its first section forms an almost constant incline to the beginning of Woodseats. Between the old Meersbrook Quarry and Heeley Retail Park are views to the west of the Sheaf Valley.
