= Bishops' House =

Historic house museum in Sheffield, England

Coordinates: 53°21′5″N 1°28′13″W

Bishops' House is a half-timbered house in Norton Lees, a suburban area of Sheffield, England. It was built c. 1500 and is located on the southern tip of Meersbrook Park. It is one of the three surviving timber-framed houses in Sheffield (the others being the Old Queen's Head and Broom Hall).

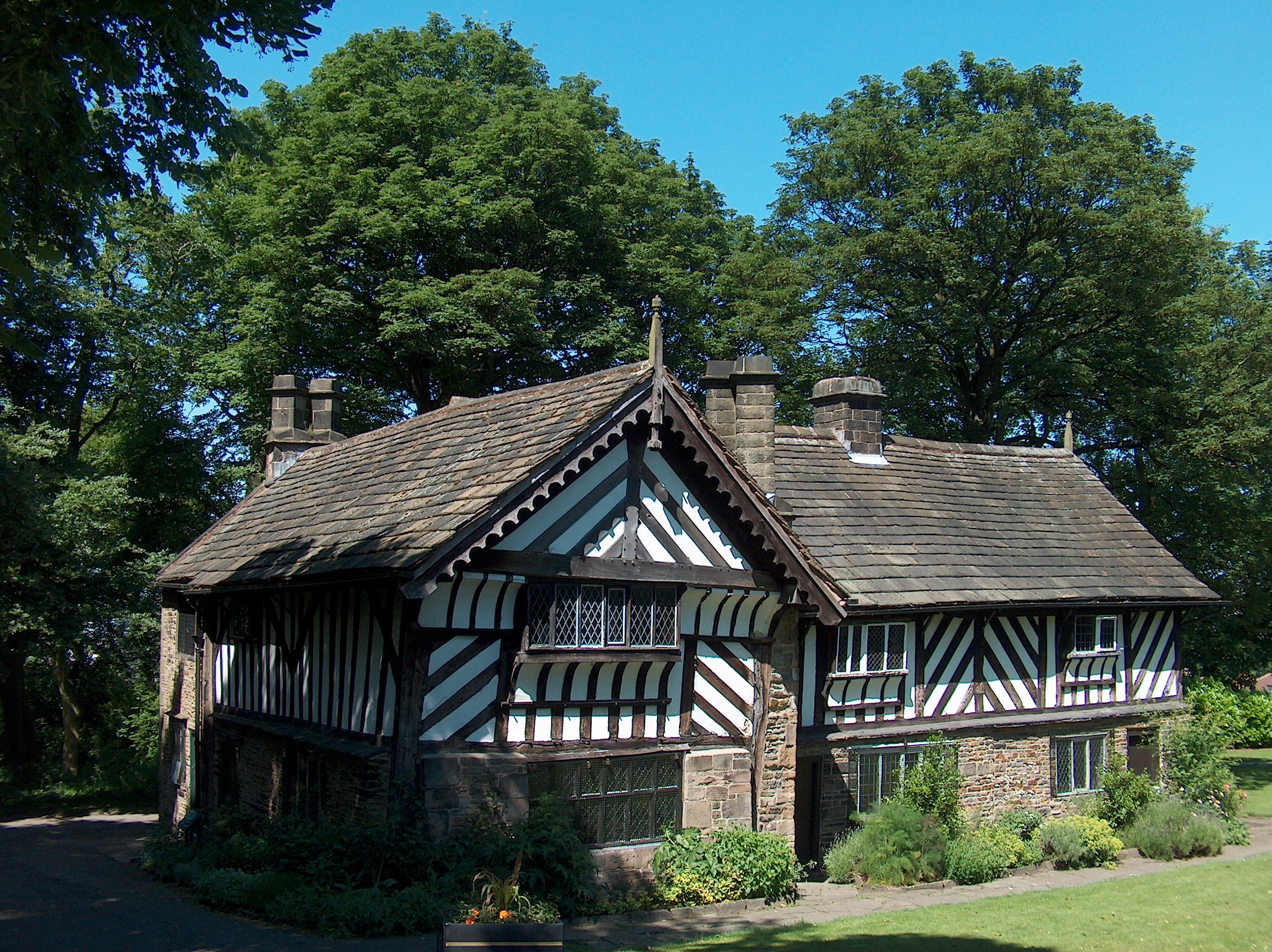
Bishops' House

It is known as Bishops' House because it was said to have been built for two brothers, John and Geoffrey Blythe, both of whom became Bishops. There is, however, no evidence that they ever lived in this house—the first known resident is William Blythe, a farmer and scythe manufacturer, who was living here in 1627.

Samuel Blyth was the last of the family to live in the house, dying in 1753, after which his sons sold the house to a William Shore. The Blyth family subsequently moved to Birmingham. Notable descendants were Benjamin Blyth, Sir Arthur Blyth and Benjamin Blyth II. The house was subsequently let to a tenant farmer and his labourer, at which point it was sub-divided into two dwellings.

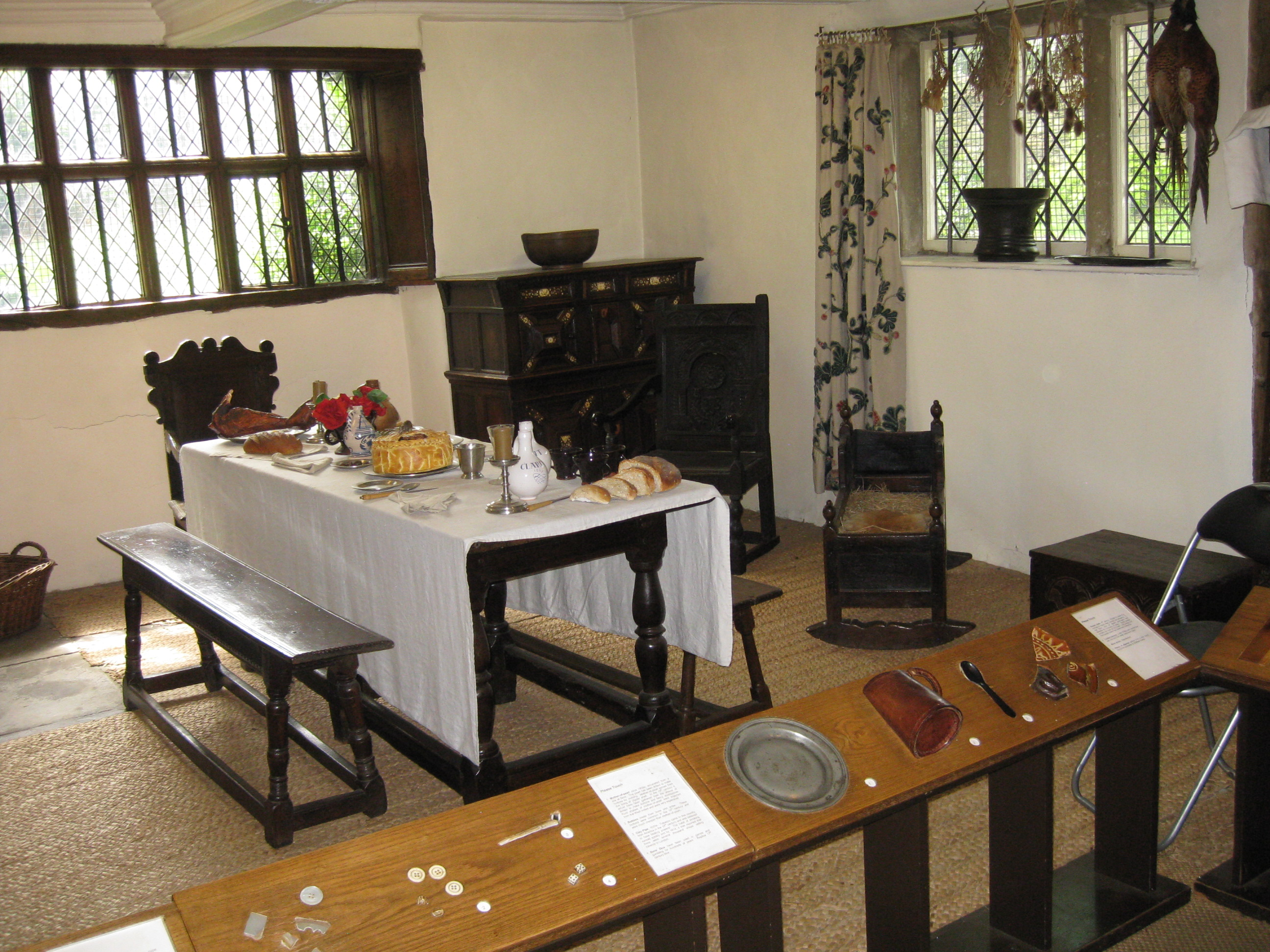
The Dining Room

In 1886 ownership passed to the Corporation (Sheffield City Council) and various recreation department employees lived in the house until 1974.

It is a Grade II* listed building and has been open as a museum since 1976, following a renovation funded by English Heritage and Sheffield City Council. The Sheffield Galleries and Museums Trust managed the building for some years until April 2011, when management of public opening, on behalf of the building's owner Sheffield City Council, was conferred to the Friends of Bishops' House. The displays in the house have had some recent small changes but are still curated by Museums Sheffield. The Friends of Bishops' House is a registered charity and limited company, run entirely by volunteers. The house contains exhibitions on life in the 16th and 17th centuries with two rooms decorated in Jacobean style.

The building is featured on the cover of local band Monkey Swallows the Universe's second album The Casket Letters.

== See also ==
- Listed buildings in Sheffield
