= Graves Park (ward) =

Electoral ward in the City of Sheffield, South Yorkshire, England

Coordinates: 53.339°N 1.464°W

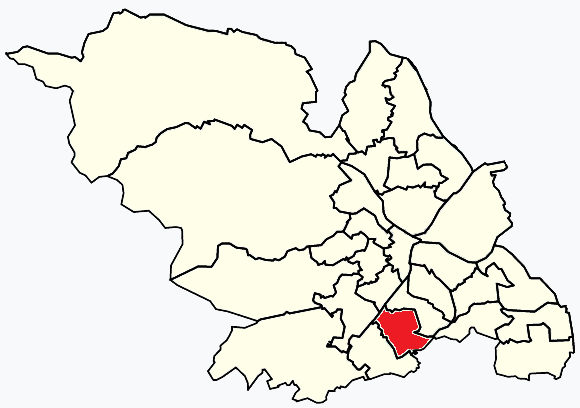
- Shown within Sheffield
- Population: 16,705 (2011 census)
- Metropolitan borough: City of Sheffield
- Metropolitan county: South Yorkshire
- Region: Yorkshire and the Humber
- Country: England
- Sovereign state: United Kingdom
- UK Parliament: Sheffield Heeley
- Councillors: Rob Bannister (Labour Party); Tom Atkin-Withers (Green Party); Mohammed Mahroof (Liberal Democrats)

Graves Park ward—which includes the districts of Norton, Norton Lees, Norton Woodseats, and Woodseats—is one of the 28 electoral wards in City of Sheffield, England. It is located in the southern part of the city and covers an area of 5.8 km^{2}. The population of this ward in 2011 was 16,705 people in 7,464 households. It is one of the five wards that form the Sheffield Heeley parliamentary constituency in the House of Commons. The districts of this ward were in the historic county of Derbyshire, but they have now been absorbed into the metropolitan borough of Sheffield, thus placing them in the ceremonial county of South Yorkshire.

The ward is named after Graves Park, a large park located between Woodseats and Norton. This 248 acre (1 km^{2}) park is the largest in Sheffield, and was presented to the city by J. G. Graves in 1925.

== Districts of Graves Park ward ==
=== Woodseats/Norton Woodseats ===
Historically, Norton Woodseats (grid reference SK347833) was a village that straddled Derbyshire Lane running from Four Lane Ends to Bolehill (now part of Graves Park). The name Woodseats comes from the Old English Wodesettes, which means a 'fold in a wood'. Woodseats itself was little more than a cluster of cottages around a road called 'The Dale' close to the intersection of Woodseats Road and Chesterfield Road (A61).

=== Norton ===
Norton (grid reference SK358818) is a village, now a district of Sheffield. There has been a settlement here since, at least, Saxon times. St James' Church dates from before 1172. The grave of the sculptor Sir Francis Chantrey (7 April 1782 – 25 November 1841)—who was born in the village—can be seen just outside the church. Other significant buildings in the area include Norton Hall and Oakes Park. The non-flying RAF station, RAF Norton, was based in the area from 1939 to 1965.

=== Norton Lees ===
Norton Lees (grid reference SK353839) is a residential suburb located to the east of Woodseats.
