= Heeley =

Area in S2, Sheffield, England

Coordinates: 53.36°N 1.46°W

- Suburb
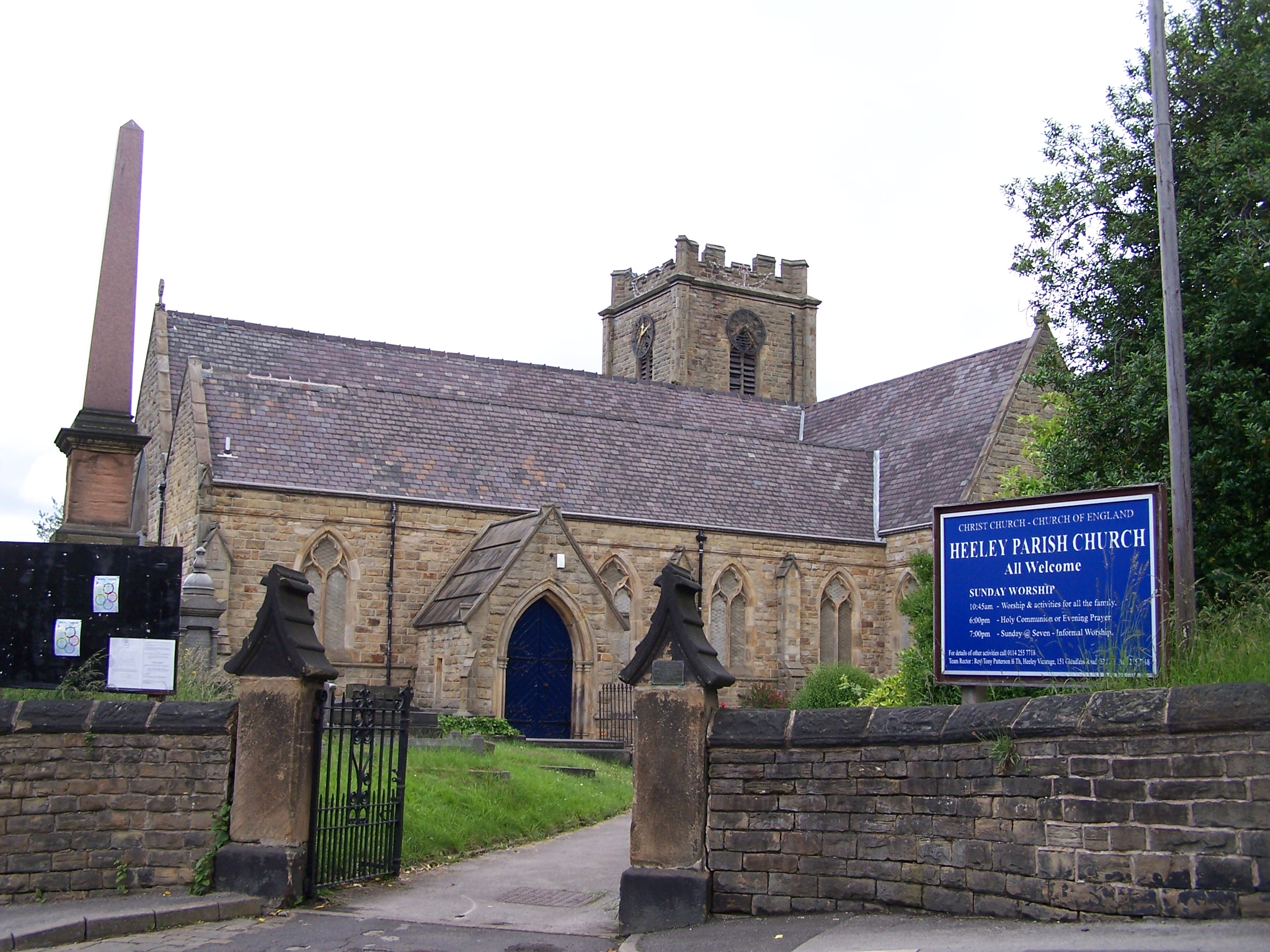

- Location within South Yorkshire
- Metropolitan borough: Sheffield
- Metropolitan county: South Yorkshire
- Region: Yorkshire and the Humber
- Country: England
- Sovereign state: United Kingdom
- Post town: SHEFFIELD
- Postcode district: S2, S8
- Dialling code: 0114
- Police: South Yorkshire
- Fire: South Yorkshire
- Ambulance: Yorkshire
- UK Parliament: Sheffield Heeley

Heeley was a cluster of small villages which now form a suburb in the south of the city of Sheffield, South Yorkshire, England. The village has existed at least since 1343, its name deriving from Heah Leah, High Lea then Hely, meaning a high, woodland clearing. Originally Heeley was divided into three: Upper Heeley (or Heeley Top) was around the intersection of Myrtle Road and Heeley Green, Middle Heeley was on the Gleadless Road at Well Road, and Lower Heeley (or Heeley Bottom) was on the London Road around Artisan View. At the 2011 Census the village formed part of the Gleadless Valley ward of the City of Sheffield.

== History ==
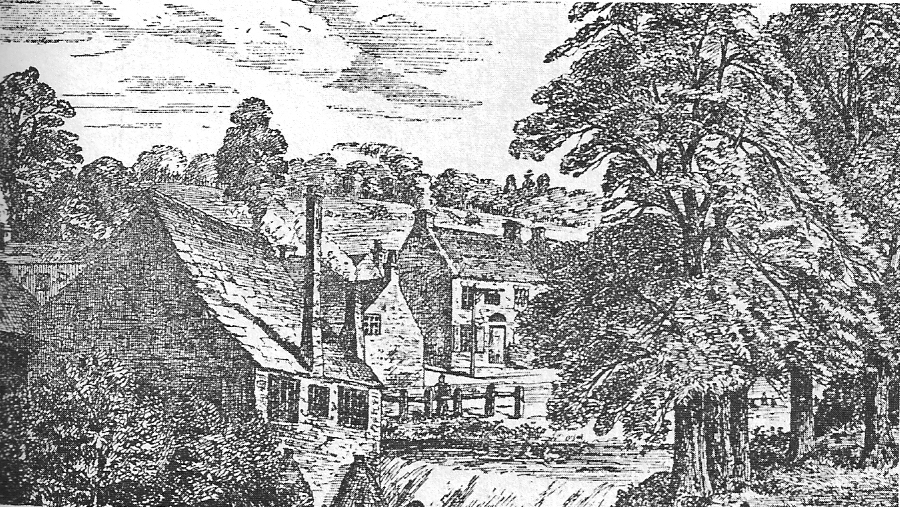
Heeley Bottom from across the River Sheaf in about 1825. The White Lion on London Road is in the background.

Heeley Methodist Church was built in 1826. In 1833 Heeley there were 47 householders living in Nether, Middle and Upper Heeley. Heeley Parish was formed in 1846 from part of St Mary's Parish on Bramall Lane. Heeley Parish Church (Christ Church, Heeley) was opened in August 1848 and the first vicar was Rev. Henry Denson Jones. The clock in the tower of Heeley church was added in 1901 to commemorate the long reign of Queen Victoria. In the yard are buried more than 3000 children, most of them in unmarked graves. In 1876 the population of Heeley reached 3860 inhabitants.

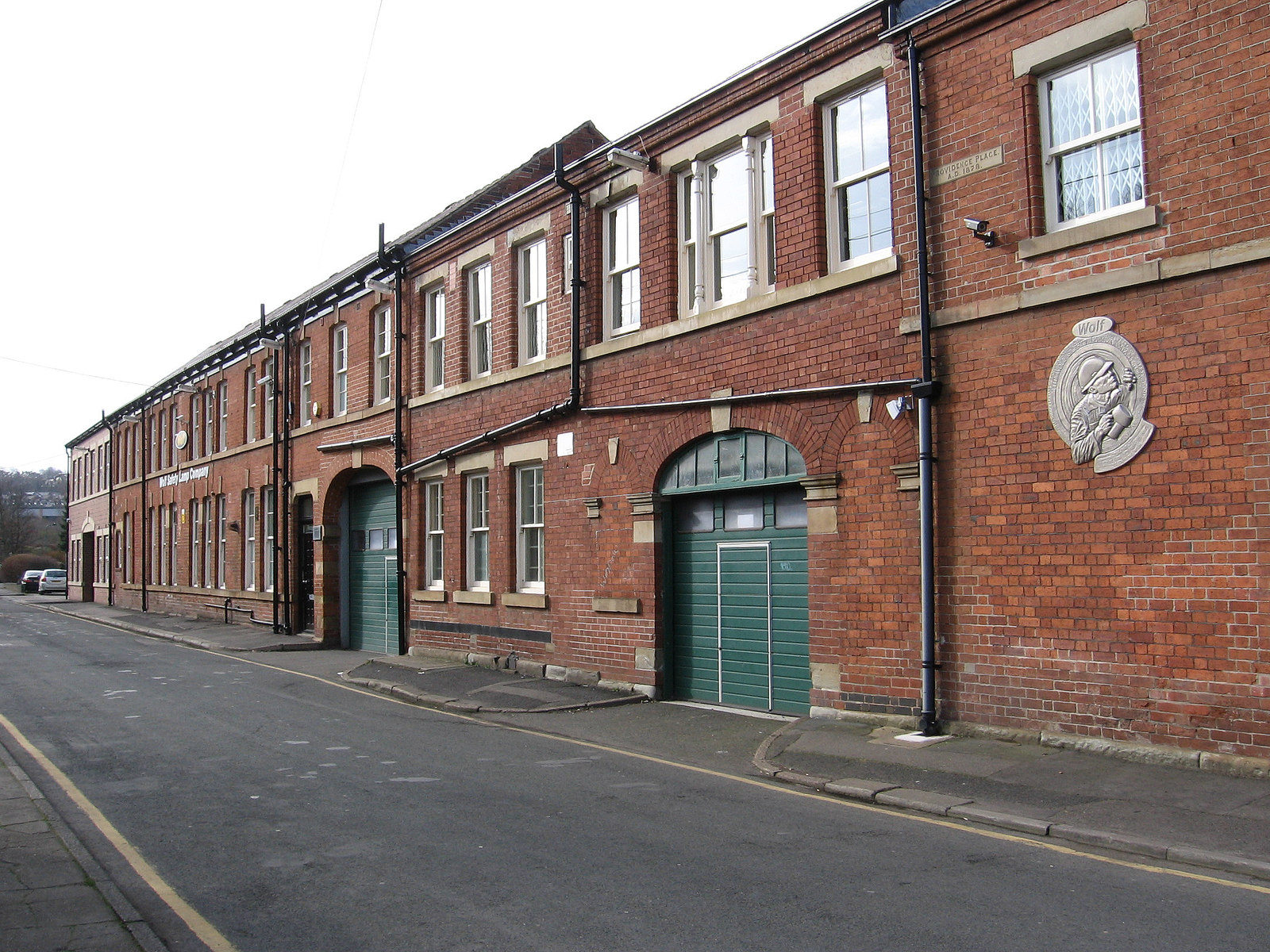
The Wolf Safety Lamp Company in Heeley was managed by Monica Maurice.

Many shops exist in Heeley and many remain open. Harry Ponsford and Arnold Laver were two successful merchants, the first starting a modest moving business using a handcart, the second selling timber. Ponsford opened a furniture shop on London Road and Arnold Laver opened several outlets in Heeley, Mosborough and Chesterfield. The Heeley Mosque was also completed in 2008.

Heeley was formerly a chapelry, on 23 December 1880 Heeley became a separate civil parish being formed from Nether Hallam, on 1 April 1904 the parish was abolished to form Ecclesall. In 1901 the parish had a population of 14,822. It is now in the unparished area of Sheffield. The suburb of Meersbrook which had been built since the Industrialisation of the area, is a part of the Heeley area that was originally on the Derbyshire side of the border until it became part of the growing industrial city of Sheffield in the late 19th century.

== Transport ==
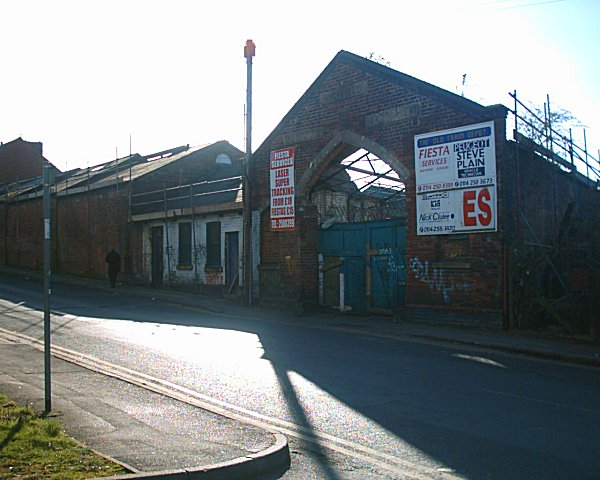
Heeley tram depot in winter 2006.

The main road through Heeley is the A61 London Road South/Chesterfield Road, this dates from 1757 when it was built as a turnpike road from Sheffield to Chesterfield. A toll bar was built on this road at Heeley over the Meers Brook on the boundary between Yorkshire and Derbyshire. The Midland Main Line railway line between Chesterfield and Sheffield, constructed in 1870, also passes through Heeley, a station and carriage siding were built on the former site of Heeley Mill. The station had two island platforms serving 4 tracks; two were fast, the two others slow. Heeley station was the first stop from Sheffield station. The station closed in the 1960s and the line narrowed to two tracks. A siding called Heeley Sidings remains and stretches from Heeley Retail Park to Archer Road. Sheffield's old tramway stretched from Sheffield city centre to Woodseats and Heeley was at a time the terminus. The tramway depot still stands on Albert Road and although damaged in high winds in 2007, has recently undergone significant and sympathetic renovation.

- Heeley Festival, one of Sheffield’s oldest Community Festivals. It’s part of a programme of community events and celebrations co-ordinated by HDT throughout the year.
- Heeley Institute, The Institute is a Grade II listed building and former chapel on the corner of Hartley Street and Gleadless Road, in between the old Anns Grove School and Heeley Parish Church. It is one of the oldest buildings in the area and was the first place of worship in Heeley when it was built in 1826. It was restored in 2001 by Tom Heeley Development Trust and is now a community space.

== Heeley City Farm ==
Heeley City Farm is a city farm project in the north west of Heeley near the railway line. The farm is participating in several green initiatives, with a Wind turbine, and Green roofs to some structures being part of this project. The site was originally cleared as part of a scheme to build a new dual carriageway route from the south into the centre, possibly the Heeley Bypass, and the cleared sites along Bramall Lane were part of this scrapped scheme, from the 1960s.

Anns Grove Primary School

First constructed in 1897 following the downfall of Gleadless Road Junior and Infants School, Anns Grove Primary School would be locked in 2 buildings, 1 now Sheffield Chinese Church and 1 now Sum Studios.

In 2003, days plans for a new, more bigger school just 100 yards away from the old one; this was because Heeley Bank School ( at the top of Myrtle Road ) had closed. Then, in September 2005, the new Anns Grove Primary School opened. The Sheffield Chinese Christian Church was converted in 2013 and Sum Studios was converted in 2016.

At the start of the 2021/22 campaign, Anns Grove Primary School was named the most oversubscribed school in Sheffield.

At the end of the 2021/2022 academic year, Anns Grove entered yet another new era with Mrs. Sam Fearnehough leaving on an early retirement and being replaced with the Deputy Headteacher, Miss. Ann Farrar.

At the start of the 2024/2025 year, new modular classrooms were built on the school playground.
