= Meers Brook =

Stream in Sheffield, England

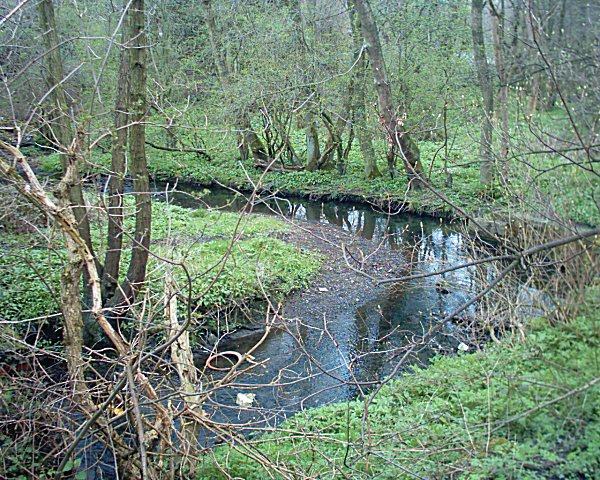
Meers Brook near Cat Lane, Meersbrook

The Meers Brook is a brook in Sheffield, England, and one of the main tributaries of the River Sheaf. It originates in Gleadless (Note: 53.347°N 1.432°W) and flows downhill through Gleadless Valley and Meersbrook then, culverted, continues underneath Heeley to pour into the River Sheaf near Saxon Road and Clyde Road. (Note: 53.359°N 1.477°W)

== Course ==
The river starts at a spring west of Gleadless Townend, close to some allotment gardens, and heads in a west-north-westerly direction, passing through Herdings Wood north of Herdings, which is part of the Gleadless Valley area of Sheffield. In the woods it is joined by another small stream. South of Rollestone, it is joined by a stream that rises in Hemsworth, and flows northwards through wooded terrain, which joins onto Rollestone Wood. After passing under Blackstock Road, it is joined by another stream, which rises in Buck Wood, Newfield Green, and flows in a south-westerly direction. A series of streams rise in Leeshall Wood, and combine before joining Meers Brook near the Rollestone recycling centre. The river used to flow around the northern edge of the recycling site and across open land bordered on the northern side by High Bank Wood, and to the south by Car Wood, but it has been culverted in this area.

Near the end of the culvert, it is joined by a stream which rises near Norton Woodseats sports ground, from where it flows northwards. The stream flows under Cat Lane to join Meers Brook, and then both flow under Cat Lane again, along the northern edge of Meersbrook allotment gardens, and under Carfield Lane. There is then a short section where it forms the boundary between gardens on Northcote Avenue and Meersbrook Road, before it disappears into a culvert where Northcote Avenue, Meersbrook Road and Albert Road meet. Before the culvert was built, the stream ran along the bottom of gardens on Albert Road, passed under Brooklyn Road, passed the north end of Molloy Street, and then flowed around Joseph Tyzack's saw works. The building dates from the 1880s and was constructed of red bricks, although modifications were made in the 20th century. Tyzack made saws there until the mid-20th century, after which the works, offices and salesroom were reused as workshops. The building is grade II listed. The river marked the end of Bradbury Street and Arlington Road, and then passed under houses on London Road and Heeley railway sidings serving a goods depot, and the main line into Sheffield railway station, before it joined the Sheaf near Saxon Road.

== History ==
Historically the stream formed the boundary between the historic counties of Yorkshire and Derbyshire, formed part of the boundary between the ancient kingdoms of Northumbria and Mercia, and today marks the boundary between the North of England and the North Midlands.

In 1957, the section from Albert Road to the railway culvert was enclosed in a culvert. The scheme was planned by the city engineer, H. Foster, and was designed to reduce flooding of homes in Heeley and Meersbrook, and to carry additional water away from new housing in the Gleadless Valley. The culvert was about 0.75 miles (1.2 km) long, and although it broadly followed the existing line of the river, the bends were ironed out where possible, providing a much straighter course. At the start, it ran through concrete pipes which were 6 feet (1.8 m) in diameter, but then ran through rectangular castings of various sizes. As part of the work, the original culvert under Chesterfield Road and the railway was strengthened. The drop in level of the river bed between the two ends of the culvert was handled by constructing several staircases, down which the water flowed. The culvert was designed to take a maximum flow of 25,000 cubic feet (710 m^{3}) per minute.

== Water quality ==
The Environment Agency measure water quality of the river systems in England. Each is given an overall ecological status, which may be one of five levels: high, good, moderate, poor and bad. There are several components that are used to determine this, including biological status, which looks at the quantity and varieties of invertebrates, angiosperms and fish. Chemical status, which compares the concentrations of various chemicals against known safe concentrations, is rated good or fail.

The Environment Agency do not publish separate data for Meers Brook, but the river is included as part of the River Sheaf data. Water quality was as follows in 2019.

Section	Ecological Status	Chemical Status	Length	Catchment	Channel
Sheaf from Source to River Don	Moderate	Fail	18.4 miles (29.6 km)	20.33 square miles (52.7 km^{2})	heavily modified

The river is only rated moderate for ecological status because the channel has been heavily modified by human activity. Like many rivers in the UK, the chemical status changed from good to fail in 2019, because of the presence of polybrominated diphenyl ethers (PBDE), perfluorooctane sulphonate (PFOS) and mercury compounds, none of which had previously been included in the assessment.

== Bibliography ==
- Hey, David (2010). A History of Sheffield (3rd ed.). Carnegie Publishing. ISBN 978-1-85936-198-6.
