= Walkley =

Suburb of Sheffield, England

Coordinates: 53.393°N 1.500°W

- Location within South Yorkshire
- OS grid reference: SK336885
- Metropolitan borough: Sheffield
- Metropolitan county: South Yorkshire
- Region: Yorkshire and the Humber
- Country: England
- Sovereign state: United Kingdom
- Post town: SHEFFIELD
- Postcode district: S6
- Dialling code: 0114
- Police: South Yorkshire
- Fire: South Yorkshire
- Ambulance: Yorkshire
- UK Parliament: Sheffield Central

Walkley is a suburb of Sheffield, England, west of Burngreave, south of Hillsborough and north-east of Crookes.

The area consists mainly of Victorian stone-fronted terraced housing and has a relatively high student population. It also has a number of independent shops and cafes.

== History ==
The origin of the name Walkley comes from the Old English language with the original name being "Walcas Leah", meaning Walca's forest clearing. The early Anglo-Saxon village consisted of a few structures, mainly farm buildings and workmen's cottages. Most of the area was thick woodland with the few open quarters such as Crookesmoor and Bell Hagg Common being used for grazing cattle. Walkley was mentioned in several documents in the centuries after the Norman Conquest, in 1554 it was described as having several cottages and smallholdings worked by tenants of the Lord of the Manor of Sheffield. By this time the population of Walkley was around 200.

In the 17th century Walkley was connected to the village of Owlerton by the pack horse track which ascended Walkley Lane and continued to Crookes, it became a turnpike road and a heavy gate was placed across the road where tolls were collected. The Old Heavygate Inn was constructed at this point in 1696 and still stands today, it has walls two feet thick. Although local folk etymology says that Heavygate Road is named after a heavy gate, it is actually from heavy meaning muddy or hard going (as in races) and gate meaning road or path (as in Fargate, Waingate, Baxtergate).

In 1601 Old Walkley Hall was constructed by William Rawson and stood until 1926 when it was demolished to make way for new housing. By 1860 the residential streets of Walkley had developed considerably and the infrastructure was basically as it is today with members of the Freedom Land Society, Fir View Land Society, Steel Bank Land Society and others building many of the new houses.

According to J. Edward Vickers, a local prophecy held that a volcano would erupt in the suburb in 1880.

== Public buildings and amenities ==
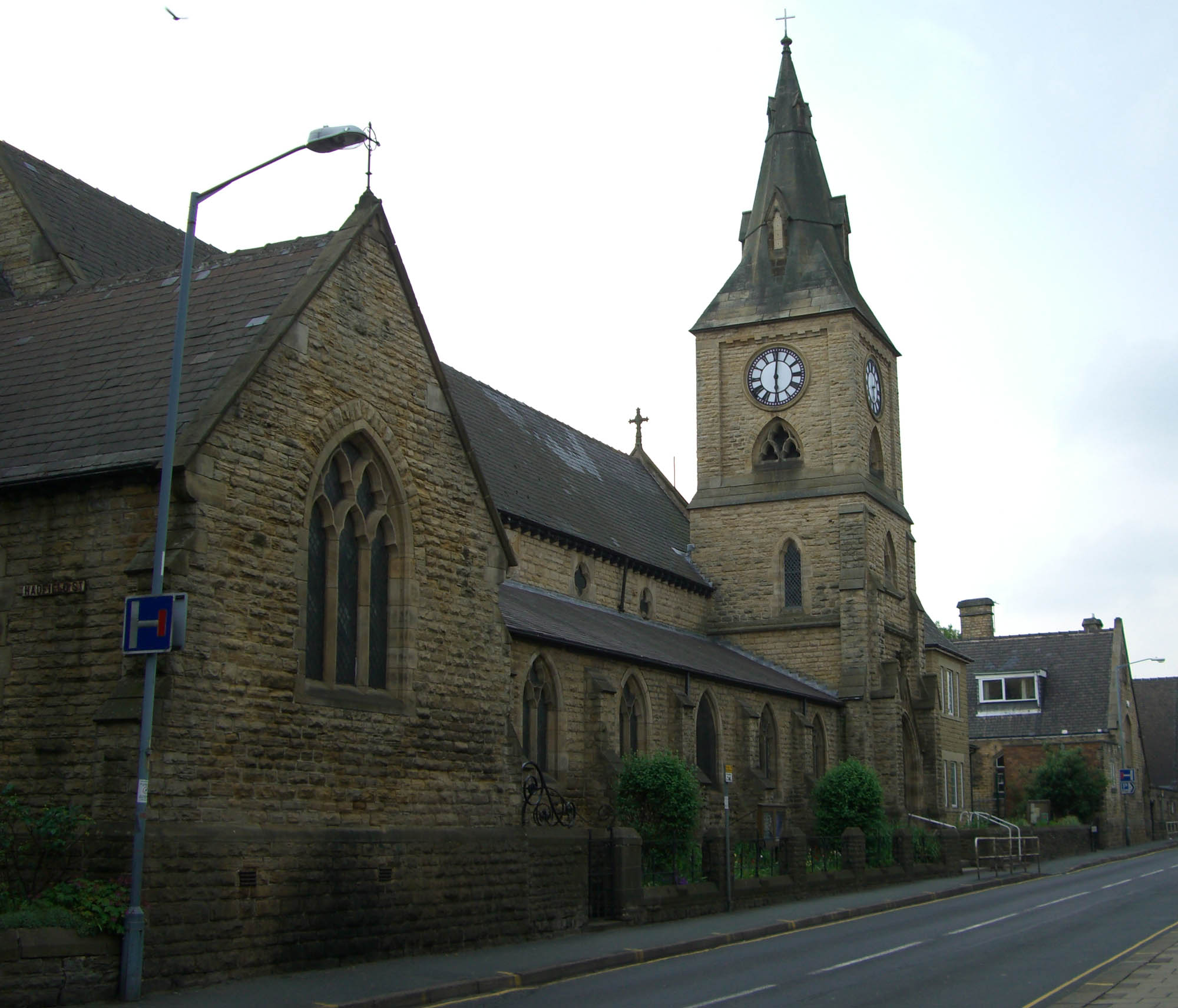
St Mary's Church

The first place of worship to be built at the location of St Mary's church was a mission church which was constructed in 1861 on the site of an old carpenters shop at the junction of Hadfield Street and Howard Road. The mission church cost £1,000 to build and was superseded by St Mary's, construction of which started in 1867 by the Sheffield Church Extension Society. Building was completed in 1869 at a cost of £3,200, it is in the Early English decorated style and has a 90 ft (27 metre) spire. The Archbishop of York consecrated the church and the first vicar was Thomas Smith. Local dignitaries made financial contributions to pay for the stained glass windows, tower, clock and bells.

There were no schools for the general public in Walkley until the opening of St Mary's church. In 1870 the Education Act was passed and St Mary's school was built in premises adjoining the church at a cost of £2,180, the money being raised by public subscription and a government grant. The school remained attached to the church until July 1978 when it moved to the former Burgoyne Road School, between Cundy Street and Burgoyne Road. The area's other primary school, Walkley Primary School is situated on Burnaby Crescent. The former school premises at St. Mary's church are now part of the Sheffield College campus. Bole Hill Primary School on Bole Hill Road closed in the early 1990s.

In 1875, John Ruskin founded the St George's Museum in Walkley. The Museum was intended to foster "the liberal education of the artisan". Climbing the steep hill from central Sheffield, cutlers and other working men were encouraged to enjoy the fresh air blowing in from the Peak District, and to enjoy the extensive collection of books, manuscripts, plaster casts and minerals kept at the museum. An online reconstruction of the Walkley Museum can be seen at Ruskin at Walkley. By 1890 the premises were too small for the expanding collection and the museum was moved to Meersbrook Park. The building was later expanded to become Ruskin House, a girls' home. It has since been developed as private flats. The Collection is currently exhibited at the Ruskin Gallery, part of Sheffield's Millennium Gallery. Ruskin Park links the two areas of Upperthorpe and Walkley.

The 20th century saw the building of Walkley branch library on land that was cleared at the junction of South Road and Walkley Road, the library was a Carnegie library built with funding partly provided by Andrew Carnegie and its boundary wall bears a commemorative plate to that effect. Due to local funding cuts, the library was transferred from the city council to the community-run Walkley Carnegie Library Group in 2014.

== Public transport ==
There was no public transport to Walkley from Sheffield city centre before 1870; in 1873 privately owned horse-drawn buses were introduced and these were superseded by the electric Sheffield Tramway in the 1890s with single decker trams initially running as far as Springvale before later being extended to South Road. The trams were decommissioned in 1956, and the whole Sheffield network finally closed in 1960, with buses taking over. The tram tracks were not taken up but were just covered over by tarmac. Walkley is today served by bus route 95. Today, the nearest South Yorkshire Supertram stop is Langsett Primrose View, served by the Blue and Yellow routes.
