= Geography of Sheffield =

Sheffield is a geographically diverse city in England. It nestles in the eastern foothills of the Pennines and the confluence of five rivers: Don, Sheaf, Rivelin, Loxley and Porter. As such, much of the city is built on hillsides, with views into the city centre or out to the countryside. The city is roughly one third urban, one third rural and one third in the Peak District. At its lowest point the city stands just 29 metres above sea level at Blackburn Meadows on the Rotherham border, rising up to over 500 m in some parts of the city to a peak of 548m at High Stones on the Derbyshire border; however, 89% of the housing in the city is between 100 and 200 metres above sea level. Over 95% of the population resides in the main urban area.

Sheffield has more trees per person than any city in Europe, outnumbering people 4 to 1. It has over 170 woodlands covering 28.27 km^{2} (6,990 acres), 78 public parks covering 18.30 km^{2} (4,520 acres) and 10 public gardens. Added to the 134.66 km^{2} (33,280 acres) of national park and 10.87 km^{2} (2,690 acres) of water this means that 61% of the 362.38 km^{2} that the city encompasses is greenspace.

Sheffield also has more types of habitat than any city in the UK. As well as urban, parkland and woodland it has agricultural and arable land, moors, meadows and freshwater based habitats. Large parts of the city are designated as Site of Special Scientific Interest including several urban areas.

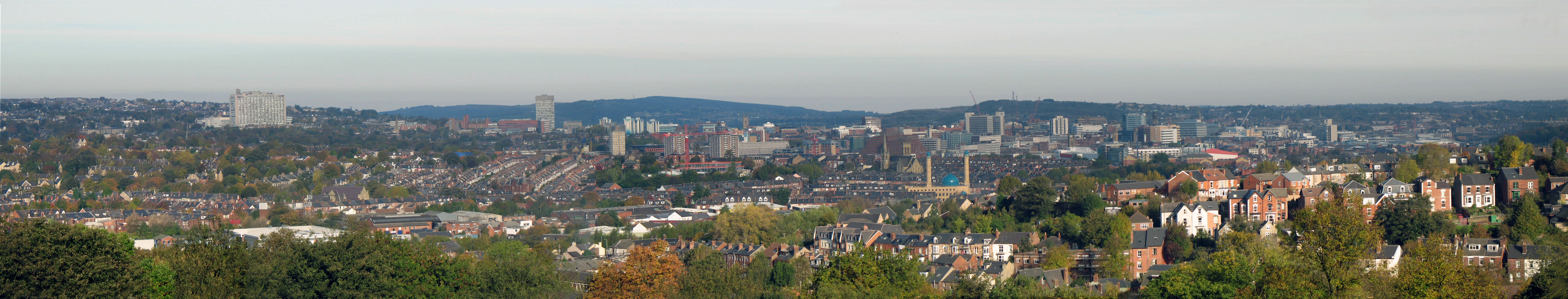
Panorama of Sheffield from Meersbrook Park

== Location ==
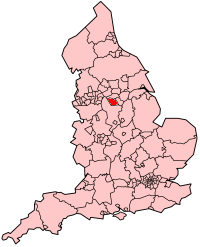
Sheffield in England

Sheffield is located at 53°23′N 1°28′W. Historically, Sheffield was part of the West Riding of Yorkshire and, before this, the Saxon shire of Hallamshire. This area is now part of the county of South Yorkshire, and borders on Nottinghamshire's forests and the Derbyshire Dales.

The city lies directly next to Rotherham with the M1 designating much of the border between them. Although Barnsley Metropoliton Borough also borders Sheffield to the north, the town itself is a few miles further. Sheffield lies in the eastern foothills of the Pennines, between the main upland range and Peak District National Park to the west, and the lower-lying South Yorkshire Coalfield to the east. The southern border is shared with Derbyshire. Over the past hundred years this has been moved south as the Sheffield urban area has grown to encompass formerly rural Derbyshire villages.

The Sheffield metropolitan area includes the City of Sheffield, Rotherham, Doncaster and Barnsley which makes up the county of South Yorkshire as well as the small towns and villages of neighbouring North East Derbyshire and North Nottinghamshire that make up the Sheffield city region which has a population of 1,811,701 in 2003. These include Eckington, Worksop, Killamarsh, Dronfield, Chesterfield and Bolsover. These areas all form an economic base for Sheffield.

== Geology and mineral exploitation ==
The oldest rocks found in the area, formed around 320 million years ago, are of the Carboniferous Period (including Millstone Grit, limestone and Coal Measures), when the region was tropical.

Carboniferous rocks in Europe generally consist of a repeated sequence of limestone and/or sandstone, shale and coal beds. The Carboniferous coal beds provided much of the fuel for power generation during the Industrial Revolution. (Another natural source of fuel in the area was peat, the neighbouring peat moors having started forming around 10,000 years ago).

The South Yorkshire Coalfield, formerly in the West Riding of Yorkshire (of which Sheffield was traditionally part), was one of the chief sources of mineral wealth in the region. Several types of coal were present in the county, from bituminous (ideal for domestic heating) to "Thick Coal", of a semi-anthracitic quality, appropriate for use in iron-smelting and in engine furnaces. Associated with the Upper Coal Measures were valuable iron ore deposits, occurring in the form of nodules. Large quantities of locally occurring fireclay were also exploited, as well as ganister (a clay used to make refractory furnace linings).

== Rivers and streams ==
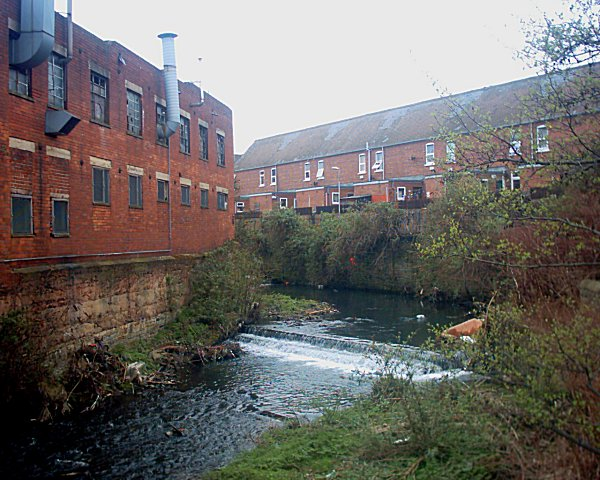
River Sheaf in Highfield, flowing between Victorian factories.

The city of Sheffield derives its name from the River Sheaf, which until the 17th century was written as Scheth or Sheath. Sidney Oldall Addy equates the origins of this word with the Old English shed (as in water-shed) or sheth, which mean to divide, or separate. Historically, the Sheaf, along with Meers Brook and a minor tributary, Limb Brook, formed part of the border separating the Anglo-Saxon kingdoms of Mercia and Northumbria.

Limb Brook rises at the village of Ringinglow, flowing east to merge with the Sheaf and it was close to this point that part of the stream was diverted to provide the goit for the Abbeydale Industrial Hamlet millpond.

The source of the River Sheaf itself is the union of Totley Brook and Old Hay Brook and its main tributaries are Porter Brook and Meers Brook. (Totley Brook passes south of Totley and meets Old Hay Brook at Needham's Dyke). The Sheaf flows northwards to join the River Don near Blonk Street Bridge in the city centre. This lower section of the River Sheaf together with the River Don, between the present Blonk Street and Lady's Bridge, formed part of the perimeter of Sheffield Castle.

Porter Brook's source is just inside the Peak District National Park, to the west of the city, at Clough Hollow, also near Ringinglow. From here it flows eastward to meet the Sheaf, at a point now located underneath Sheffield station.

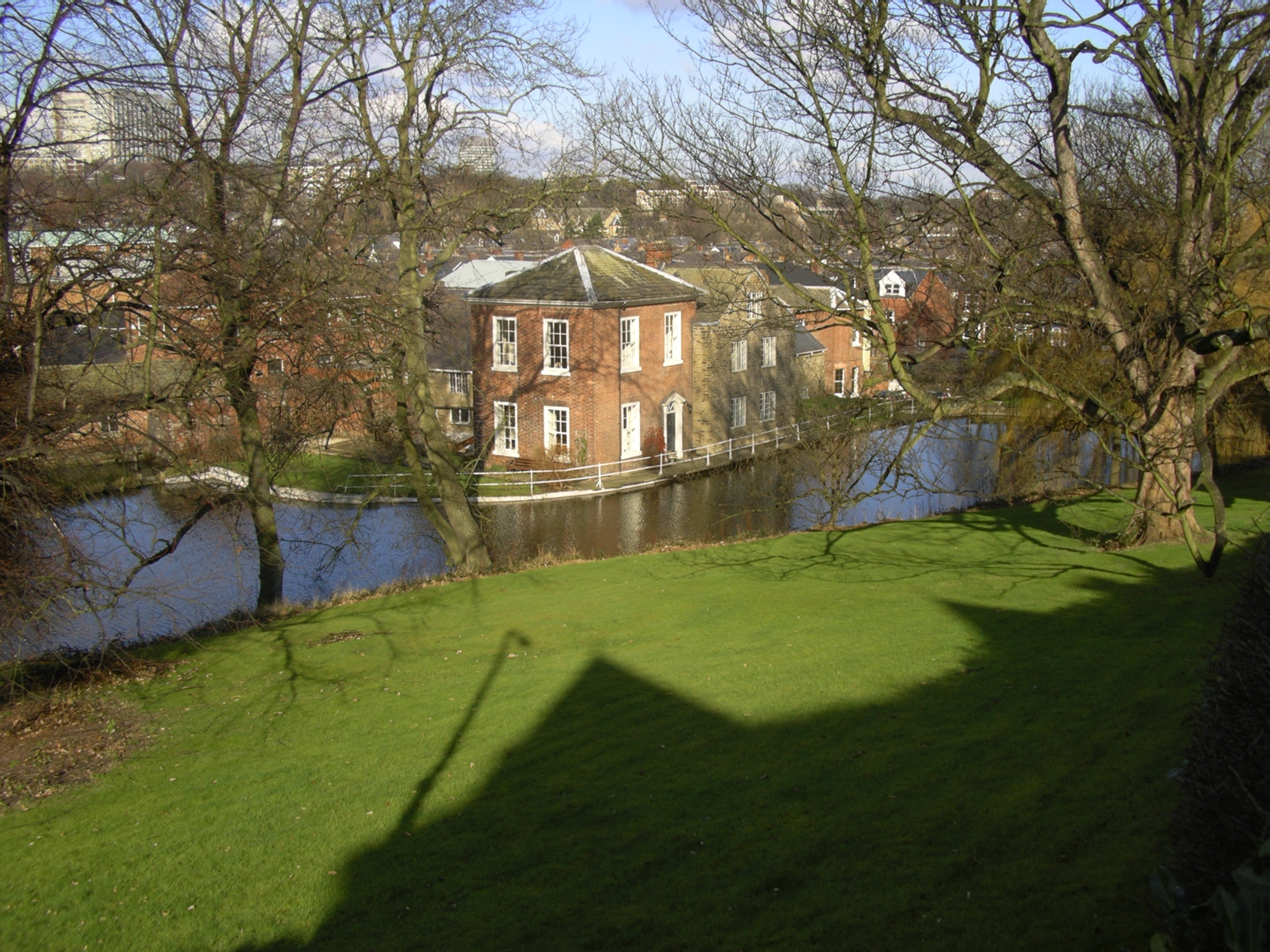
Porter Brook at Sharrow Mills, Sheffield.

The River Don rises in the Pennines and flows for 70 miles (110 km) eastwards, through the Don Valley, via Penistone, Sheffield, Rotherham, Mexborough, Conisbrough, Doncaster and Stainforth. The river's major tributaries are the Loxley, the Rivelin, the Sheaf, the Rother and the Dearne.

The sources of the Rivers Loxley and Rivelin lie to the north west of Sheffield, on the Hallam moors above Low Bradfield. The Loxley flows eastwards through Damflask Reservoir and joins the Rivelin at Malin Bridge, before flowing into the River Don at Owlerton, in Hillsborough. The rivers are relatively fast flowing, especially the Rivelin, being fed by a constant release of water from the nearby moorland peat. The Rivelin's flow was exploited for centuries as a power source, driving the water wheels of up to twenty industries (forges, metal-working and flour mills), the earliest of which dates back to 1600.

Wyming Brook's source is the Redmires Reservoirs near the Hallam Moors. It flows in a north-easterly direction for over 0.6 miles (0.97 km) down quite steep terrain into an underground chamber where it joins the Rivelin tunnel before it flows into the lower of the Rivelin Dams.

The River Rother rises at Pilsley near Clay Cross in Derbyshire, and from there flows northwards through the eastern suburbs of Sheffield to its confluence with the River Don at Rotherham. Its main tributaries are the River Drone, the River Hipper and the River Doe Lea.

Being at the confluence of several natural waterways, the development of a canal system marked an important evolution in the city's transport network, initially for commercial use and, more recently, for leisure activities. The Sheffield and South Yorkshire Navigation (S&SY) is a system of navigable inland waterways (canals and canalised rivers) in Yorkshire and Lincolnshire.

== Natural history ==
=== Sheffield's beginnings ===
The village of Sheffield dates back to before the beginning of the last millennium. It grew around a fortified building (later a castle) located at the confluence of the rivers Sheaf and Don. A number of hamlets and villages grew up in the surrounding area, many around the fledgling industries that utilised the area's five fast flowing rivers, along with locally mined coal and iron. Surviving examples of this early industry are now maintained as museums at Abbeydale Industrial Hamlet, which dates back to at least the 13th century, and Shepherd Wheel.

The villages steadily grew around this industry. By the 18th century Sheffield had become a thriving market town and was already the country's leading cutlery producer.

=== Industrial Revolution ===
With the coming of the Industrial Revolution, Sheffield became one of England's fastest growing towns. It grew over ten times in size to 400,000 within the 19th century. However, this expansion had a devastating impact on the surrounding area. Smog became a regular occurrence especially in the city centre that was at the bottom of a natural bowl. The River Don became one of the most polluted rivers in Europe. In his 1937 book The Road to Wigan Pier, George Orwell said that Sheffield 'could justly claim to be called the ugliest town in the Old World'.

However, in the 1930s Sheffield City Council and public benefactors such as J.G.Graves started buying rural land around Sheffield in order to protect it from developers. This was one of the earliest examples of greenbelt land.

== Urban area ==
The residential areas cover the majority of the south and north-west of the city, the most affluent areas being in the south-west. A lot of the housing is post-World War II due to wartime destruction of housing by German bombing and post war slum clearance. This quite often took the form of large scale apartment buildings such as Park Hill, although some have since been demolished due to poor construction and high crime rates.

Large parts of the city are industrial, mainly in the north-east. These areas saw a large decline during the 1970s and 1980s. The Sheffield Development Corporation was created to arrest this slide. However, most of the new developments, such as the Meadowhall Centre, are in the service industry. It was also the location for most of the venues for the World Student Games and now hosts the English Institute of Sport.

Although the vast majority of the green space is outside the main urban area, all the parkland and 14.00 km^{2} (3,460 acres) of woodland is within the urban area. The largest park is Graves Park at 0.83 km^{2}, closely followed by Endcliffe Park. The largest wood is Ecclesall Woods at 1.35 km^{2} (330 acres).

=== Areas ===
Sheffield is made up of numerous areas that vary widely in size and history. Many of these areas developed from villages or hamlets that have become absorbed into Sheffield as the city has grown. For this reason, whilst the centre of most areas is easy to define, the boundaries of many of the areas are ambiguous. The areas are largely ignored by the administrative and political divisions of the city, instead it is divided into 28 electoral wards, with each ward generally covering 4–6 areas. The electoral wards are grouped into six parliamentary constituencies, although due to a different review cycle the ward and constituency boundaries are currently not all conterminous.

While the majority of the areas are within the main urban area of Sheffield some of the outlying areas remain separated by rural land. The largest such area is Stocksbridge and Deepcar, which contains around 13,500 people. The rural two thirds of the city contains under 3,000 people.

== Climate ==
According to the Köppen classification, Sheffield has a temperate oceanic climate (Cfb) like the rest of the United Kingdom. The uplands of the Pennines to the west can create a cool, gloomy and wet environment, but they also provide shelter from the prevailing westerly winds, casting a "rain shadow" across the area. This means the city is usually spared the worst impacts of intense storms in other areas of the country. In certain circumstances however, if the winds align perfectly with the river valleys, Sheffield can actually be disproportionately affected, as was the case with the Great Sheffield Gale in 1962; four people died and 150,000 houses in the city suffered damage. Due to the differences in altitude, the weather can be vastly different over various parts of the city. Deepcar and Stocksbridge tend to be among the first to receive snowfall and get heavier downpours.

Between 1971 and 2000 Sheffield averaged 824.7 mm (32.47 in) of rain per year; December was the wettest month with 91.9 mm (3.62 in) and July the driest with 51.0 mm (2.01 in). July was also the hottest month, with an average maximum temperature of 20.8 °C (69.4 °F). The highest temperature ever recorded in the city of Sheffield was 39.4 °C (102.9 °F), on 19 July 2022. The average yearly high temperature is about 12 °C (54 °F), and yearly lows tend to remain around an average of 6.5 °C (43.7 °F). The average minimum temperature in January and February was 1.6 °C (34.9 °F), though the lowest temperatures recorded in these months can be between −10 and −15 °C (14 and 5 °F), although since 1960, the temperature has never fallen below −9.2 °C (15.4 °F), suggesting that urbanisation around the Weston Park site during the second half of the 20th century may prevent temperatures below −10 °C (14 °F) occurring.

The coldest temperature to be recorded was −8.2 °C (17.2 °F) in 2010. (Note: The official Weston Park Weather Station statistics, which can also be viewed at Sheffield Central Library, has the temperature at −8.7 °C (16.3 °F), recorded on 20 December, and states that to be the lowest December temperature since 1981.) The coldest temperature ever recorded in the city of Sheffield at Weston Park, since records began in 1882, is −14.6 °C (5.7 °F), registered in February 1895. The lowest daytime maximum temperature in the city since records began is −5.6 °C (21.9 °F), also recorded in February 1895. More recently, −4.4 °C (24.1 °F) was recorded as a daytime maximum at Weston Park, on 20 December 2010 (from the Weston Park Weather Station statistics, which also can be viewed at Sheffield Central Library.) On average, through the winter months of December to March, there are 67 days during which ground frost occurs.

The Weston Park Weather station, established in 1882, is one of the longest running weather stations in the United Kingdom. It has recorded weather for more than 125 years, and a 2008 report showed that the climate of Sheffield is warming faster than it has at any time during this period, with 1990 and 2006 being the hottest years on record. In collaboration with the Stockholm Environment Institute, Sheffield developed a carbon footprint (based on 2004–05 consumption figures) of 5,798,361 tonnes per year. This compares to the UK's total carbon footprint of 698,568,010 tonnes per year. The factors with the greatest impact are housing (34%), transport (25%), consumer (11%), private services (9%), public services (8%), food (8%) and capital investment (5%). Sheffield City Council has signed up to the 10:10 campaign.

Climate data for Sheffield (Weston Park) WMO ID: 99107; coordinates 53°22′53″N 1°29′29″W; elevation: 131 m (430 ft); 1991–2020 normals, extremes 1882–present
Month	Jan	Feb	Mar	Apr	May	Jun	Jul	Aug	Sep	Oct	Nov	Dec	Year
Record high °C (°F)	15.9 (60.6)	18.2 (64.8)	23.3 (73.9)	26.4 (79.5)	28.9 (84.0)	30.7 (87.3)	39.4 (102.9)	34.3 (93.7)	32.9 (91.2)	25.7 (78.3)	18.9 (66.0)	17.6 (63.7)	39.4 (102.9)
Mean daily maximum °C (°F)	7.0 (44.6)	7.7 (45.9)	10.0 (50.0)	13.1 (55.6)	16.4 (61.5)	19.2 (66.6)	21.4 (70.5)	20.8 (69.4)	17.9 (64.2)	13.7 (56.7)	9.8 (49.6)	7.3 (45.1)	13.7 (56.7)
Daily mean °C (°F)	4.6 (40.3)	4.9 (40.8)	6.7 (44.1)	9.2 (48.6)	12.1 (53.8)	15.0 (59.0)	17.1 (62.8)	16.7 (62.1)	14.2 (57.6)	10.7 (51.3)	7.3 (45.1)	5.0 (41.0)	10.3 (50.5)
Mean daily minimum °C (°F)	2.2 (36.0)	2.2 (36.0)	3.4 (38.1)	5.2 (41.4)	7.8 (46.0)	10.8 (51.4)	12.8 (55.0)	12.6 (54.7)	10.5 (50.9)	7.8 (46.0)	4.8 (40.6)	2.6 (36.7)	6.9 (44.4)
Record low °C (°F)	−13.3 (8.1)	−14.6 (5.7)	−9.4 (15.1)	−7.8 (18.0)	−0.7 (30.7)	1.4 (34.5)	3.5 (38.3)	4.1 (39.4)	1.7 (35.1)	−4.1 (24.6)	−7.2 (19.0)	−10.0 (14.0)	−14.6 (5.7)
Average precipitation mm (inches)	75.7 (2.98)	67.0 (2.64)	59.5 (2.34)	58.8 (2.31)	54.5 (2.15)	75.1 (2.96)	62.2 (2.45)	65.1 (2.56)	63.5 (2.50)	78.7 (3.10)	84.7 (3.33)	86.9 (3.42)	831.6 (32.74)
Average rainy days (≥ 1.0 mm)	13.2	11.5	11.1	10.1	9.3	9.5	9.4	10.0	9.3	12.7	13.3	13.7	133.1
Mean monthly sunshine hours	50.1	76.8	121.0	153.2	198.2	181.0	180.7	181.3	138.2	97.0	59.4	48.3	1,485.2
Average ultraviolet index	0	1	2	4	5	6	6	5	4	2	1	0	3
Source 1: Met Office
Source 2: KNMI, WeatherAtlas and Meteo Climat

Month	Jan	Feb	Mar	Apr	May	Jun	Jul	Aug	Sep	Oct	Nov	Dec	Year
Avg high °C (°F)	5.5 (41.9)	6 (42.8)	8.5 (47.3)	12 (53.6)	15 (59)	18 (64.4)	19.5 (67.1)	19 (66.2)	17 (62.6)	13 (55.4)	8 (46.4)	7 (44.6)	12 (53.6)
Avg low temperature °C (°F)	1.5 (34.7)	2 (35.6)	3 (37.4)	4.5 (40.1)	6.5 (43.7)	10.5 (50.9)	12.5 (54.5)	12 (54.5)	10.5 (50.9)	7.5 (45.5)	4.5 (40.1)	2 (35.6)	6.5 (43.7)
Source: J. W. Baggaley, Director of Museums, Sheffield City Council

== Pollution ==
The pollution problem was at its most severe in the 1960s, when Sheffield was one of the most polluted cities in Europe. Since that time, due to council measures started in the 1950s and an increase in efficiency in the steel industry, it has improved greatly. In a 2005 survey Tinsley (48 parts per billion (ppb) of oxides of nitrogen (NOx)) still came 9th in a ranking of the UK pollution hotspots, while the city centre (43 ppb of NOx) remained above the government's recommended level of 21ppb NOx.

It is, however, important to evaluate several aspects of air pollution, and especially to take into consideration overall average values, rather than localized peak values sometimes cited. The UK National Air Quality Information Archive offers almost real-time monitoring "current maximum" air pollution measurements for Sheffield (City Centre and Tinsley districts) as well as many other UK towns and cities.

The European Commission's COST Action C11 (COST- European Cooperation in Science and Technology) cites, in its conclusions on "Case studies in Greenstructure Planning" involving 15 European countries:-

" Sheffield is fortunate to have one of the strongest green structures of any city in the UK. This green structure, which at its core is linked by watercourses, underlies the City. The effectiveness of the river system as the core of the green structure is supplemented by: the agricultural area, the moorland, the woodlands and water features which lie outside the built-up area. The public open spaces within the built-up area and extensive private gardens, which cover much of the surface of the City outside its core area, are also linked to this system ",

and

" All the features of the green structure in effect work together to make the City more environmentally sustainable: for example, together they act as a sponge to reduce flash flooding; they support a relatively high level of biodiversity, particularly because of the extent of the gardens and the existence of the natural corridors along the rivers; the valleys drain cooler air down from the hilltops towards the city centre and the industrial areas beyond, improving air quality and also temperatures in the summer in the built-up core ".

== Green belt ==
Green belt area in Sheffield and environs. The Peak District National Park boundary is the western extent of the green belt. South and West Yorkshire Green Belt City of Sheffield district border

Sheffield is within a green belt region that extends into the wider surrounding counties, and is in place to reduce urban sprawl, prevent the towns in the Sheffield conurbation from further convergence, protect the identity of outlying communities, encourage brownfield reuse, and preserve nearby countryside. This is achieved by restricting inappropriate development within the designated areas, and imposing stricter conditions on permitted building.

The green belt surrounds the Sheffield built-up area, avoiding particularly further sprawl towards the Peak District National Park. Larger outlying towns and villages within the borough such as Oughtibridge, Worrall, Stocksbridge/Deepcar, Wharncliffe Side are exempt from the green belt area. However, smaller villages, hamlets and rural areas such as Totley Bents, Ringinglow, Storrs, Dungworth, Holdworth, Stacey Bank, Brightolmlee, Ewden Village, Plumbley, Midhopestones, Bolsterstone, Whitley, Butterthwaite are 'washed over' by the designation. Much semi-rural land on the city's fringes is also included within. The green belt was first adopted in 1983, and the size in the borough in 2017 amounted to some 9,080 hectares (90.8 km^{2}; 35.1 sq mi).

A subsidiary aim of the green belt is to encourage recreation and leisure interests, with rural landscape features, greenfield areas and facilities including Shire Brook Valley, Beighton marsh, the prior RAF Norton Aerodrome area, The Oakes park and holiday centre, Totley rifle range, Sheffield Country Walk route, Balfour and Sheffield Tigers sports grounds and several golf courses, Beauchief Abbey and hall, Whirlow brook and valley, Bole Hill, Fox Hagg Nature Reserve and campsite, Whitwell Moor, Underbank with Midhope and More Hall reservoirs, as well as the toposcope near Ringinglow by Porter Brook, by the Peak District boundary.
