= South Yorkshire Way =

71-mile and 98-mile footpaths in England

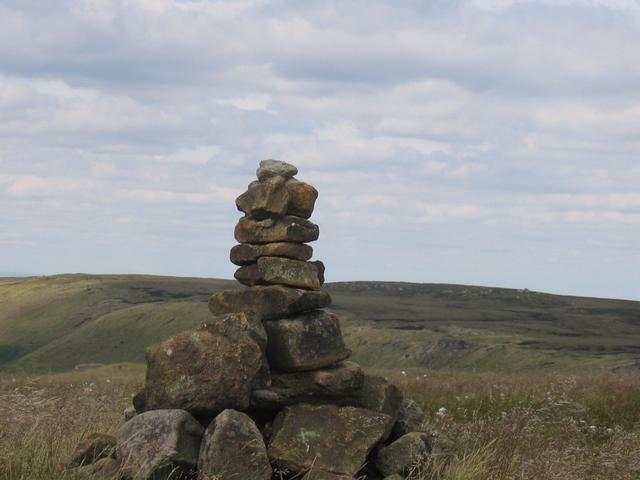
- High Stones, Sheffield
- Length: Boundary Route 171 miles (275 km); Central Route 98 miles (158 km)
- Location: South Yorkshire
- Established: 2014
- Trailheads: Thorne North railway station, South Yorkshire; 53.6162°N 0.9724°W; Dore & Totley railway station, South Yorkshire; 53.327570°N 1.515440°W
- Use: Hiking
- Highest point: High Stones
- Lowest point: Thorne and Hatfield Moors
- Season: All year
- Waymark: Yorkshire Rose above 'SY' on green and purple square

The South Yorkshire Way is the name for two interlinked Long Distance footpaths in the county of South Yorkshire. The Boundary Route is a 171-mile (275 km) route around the outskirts of the county, whilst the Central Route is a 98-mile (158 km) route through the heart of the county. Both trails start and end at the same points; Thorne North railway station and Dore & Totley railway station.

They were devised by Andrew White in 2014 to commemorate the 40th anniversary of the formation of South Yorkshire as a county.

== Background ==
The county of South Yorkshire is often overlooked for walking in preference to the more famous areas of the Yorkshire Dales and the North York Moors, with many walkers preferring the hilly terrain of those areas to the more flatter landscapes of South Yorkshire. Walker and writer Andrew White, who was born and bred in South Yorkshire, first had the idea for a circular walk around the county in 2009, as a way to encourage more visitors to the area. As White was the editor of Walks Around Britain, he put his thoughts about the possibility of creating a new long-distance walking trail in South Yorkshire on the website, which was picked up by BBC Radio Sheffield's Rony Robinson, who invited Andrew onto his mid-morning programme to talk about the new trail - which at this point was still very much a basic route.

Encouraged by the support from the listeners, White worked on a route around the boundary of the county, with a view to launching it in April 2014 - the 40th anniversary of the formation of South Yorkshire as a county, with the creation of the Metropolitan county in 1974 as part of the Local Government Act 1972.

The route linked up existing public footpaths and bridleways to make a 171 mile trail around the outskirts of South Yorkshire, with White trying to remain within South Yorkshire and to stick to the boundary as much as possible, and routing the trail through as many places of interest as he could. The first draft route was finished in January 2014.

White discovered that in planning the circular route, there were many places of interest in the centre of the county he couldn't bring into a boundary walk - so decided to devise a further trail - the 98 mile Central Route - to take in those central places; the original trail re-named the Boundary Route with the two trails meeting at points in the east and west.

The routes of the two trails are available as GPX files for walkers to follow, as the trails aren't currently waymarked for their entire length. White has stated his aim is to get the routes fully waymarked and recognised on Ordnance Survey maps.

Andrew White stated on his Twitter account he'd be finally writing a guidebook to accompany the two trails ready for the tenth anniversary of South Yorkshire Way, in 2024.

=== Central Route ===
The Central Route of the South Yorkshire Way passes close to or through the following places of interest:

- Hatfield Water Park
- St Lawrence's Church, Hatfield
- Doncaster Racecourse
- Cast
- Doncaster Mansion House
- Doncaster Minster
- Conisbrough Castle
- St Peter's Church, Conisbrough
- Thrybergh Country Park
- RSPB Dearne Valley Old Moor
- Monk Bretton Priory
- Dearne Valley Park
- Wentworth Castle
- Worsbrough Mill
- Elsecar Heritage Centre
- Needle's Eye
- Wentworth Woodhouse
- Keppel's Column
- Rotherham Minster
- Clifton Park and Museum
- River Don
- Sheffield Manor Lodge
- Sheffield Cathedral
- Sheffield City Hall
- Endcliffe Park
- Ecclesall Woods
- Beauchief Abbey

=== Boundary Route ===
The Boundary Route of the South Yorkshire Way passes close to or through the following places of interest:

- Sheffield and South Yorkshire Navigation Canal
- St Cuthbert's Church, Fishlake
- Norton Priory
- Campsall Country Park
- Robin_Hood's Well
- Brodsworth Hall
- Hooton Pagnall Hall
- Hooton_Pagnell Wood
- Howell Wood Country Park
- Notton Wood Nature Reserve
- Cawthorne Park
- Cannon Hall
- Cannon Hall Farm
- Scout Dike Reservoir
- Dunford Bridge
- Woodhead Tunnels
- Hingcliffe Common
- Howden Edge
- High Stones
- Howden Reservoir
- Cartledge Stones Ridge
- Strines Reservoir
- Stanage Edge
- Robin Hood's Cave
- Cowper Stone
- Fiddler's Elbow
- Higger Tor
- Fox House Inn
- Totley Brook
- Beauchief Abbey
- Graves Park
- Rother Valley Country Park
- Nor Wood
- Harthill Reservoir
- the former RAF Firbeck
- Roche Abbey
- Tickhill Castle
- No. 1 Yorkshire
- Church of St Nicholas, Bawtry
- Bawtry Hall
- Austerfield
- Doncaster Sheffield Airport
- Hatfield Chase
- Humberhead Levels

== Connecting trails ==
Both the Boundary Route and the Central Route use part of the existing Trans Pennine Trail where the routes meet.
