= Andrew White (presenter) =

British writer and presenter

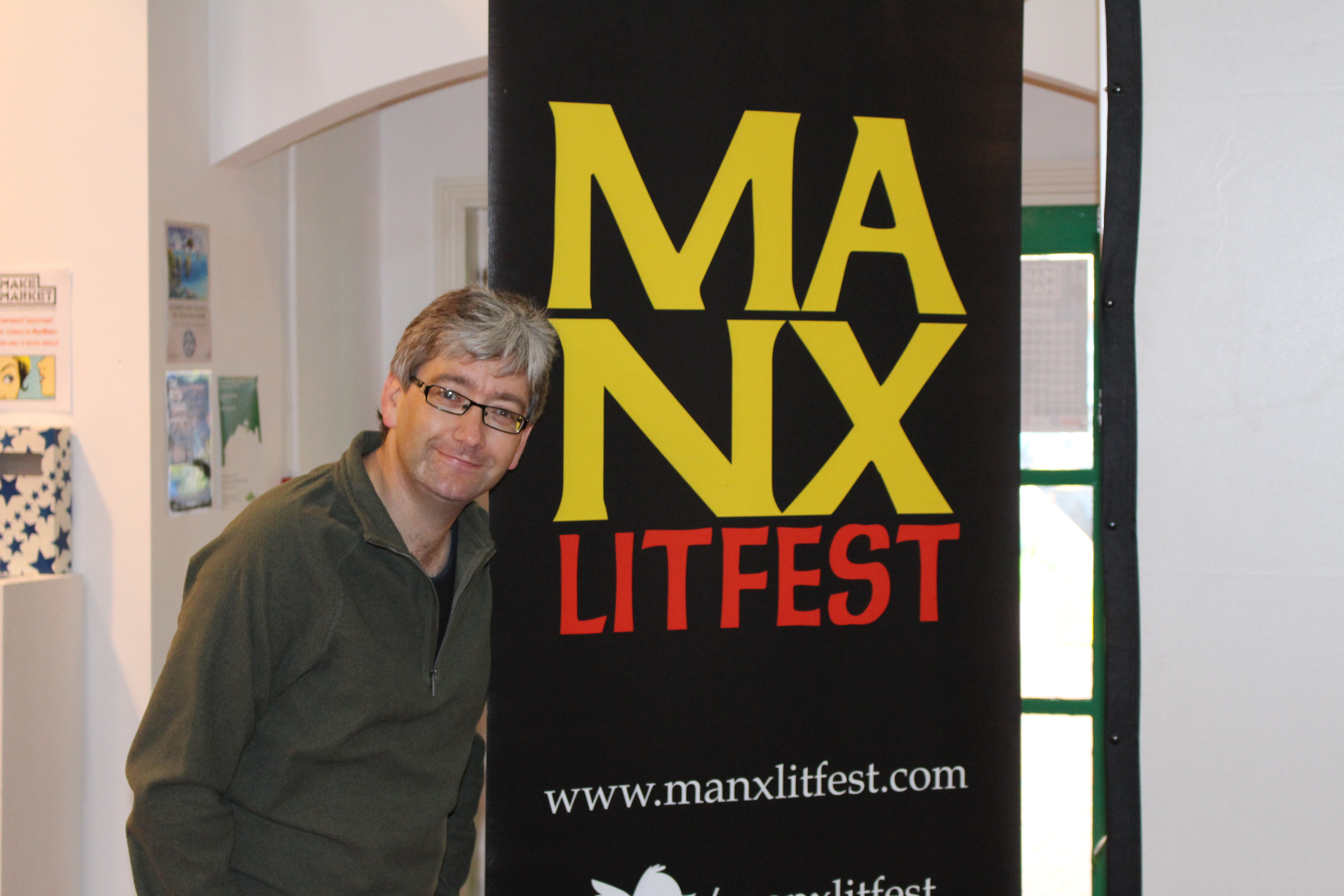
- Andrew White at Manx LitFest
- Born: Andrew Robert White; 22 February 1974 (age 52); Doncaster, West Riding of Yorkshire, England
- Occupations: writer, film-maker, broadcaster
- Years active: 1997–present
- Notable credit(s): Walks Around Yorkshire with Andrew White (2022–present); Walks Around Britain (2016–present); East Yorkshire Walks with Andrew White (2015)
- Height: 5 ft 11 in (1.80 m)
- Spouse: Amanda Hugill (2001–2025)
- Children: 2
- Website: www.andrew-white.co.uk

Andrew White (born 22 February 1974, Doncaster, West Riding of Yorkshire) is a writer, filmmaker and broadcaster. He is the senior editor of the multimedia brand Walks Around Britain, and the presenter/producer of the associated TV series.

== Early life and education ==
White was brought up in the Armthorpe area of Doncaster, South Yorkshire, and attended Shaw Wood Infants and Junior School in the village and then Armthorpe Comprehensive School. In the sixth form at Armthorpe Comprehensive School, White made television programmes such as game shows in the Common room and then edited them together with graphics from his Amiga computer. These programmes gained him an unconditional offer to join the Electronic Media Video Production course at Wolverhampton Polytechnic in 1992. He graduated in 1994 from the University of Wolverhampton as the polytechnic had since converted to a university.

== Career ==
After leaving university, White freelanced for several broadcasters before moving to Italy to work at the new Orbit Satellite Television network at the Sapienza Network Center in the Tor Sapienza area of Rome. Upon returning to the UK, he studied at the Northern Media School – a part of Sheffield Hallam University, and then returned to his home town of Doncaster to set up his own production company Nova Productions.

White was interested in making programmes about railways, buses, trams and trolleybuses, and joined with his friend Gareth Atherton to release some programmes on VHS video cassette. The first release was in 1997 – Buses of the South Yorkshire PTE : 1974–1986 – and was produced using archive Super 8 film telecined and edited into a 60-minute documentary, with vehicle sounds dubbed onto the previously silent cine film. White and Atherton produced over 50 transport programme which were released on VHS and later DVD-Video until 2005.

White changed from direct sales of programmes on DVD to making transport programmes for other production companies to release and sell on their video label. This continued until 2008 when retailers which sold these DVDs, like Woolworths, collapsed, and others like WH Smiths stopped selling DVDs in their stores.

White registered the domain name www.walksaroundbritain.co.uk in 2006, intending to do something related to walking. He ideas grew whilst watching the Wainwright Walks series on BBC Four in 2007, presented by Julia Bradbury. He decided to build a website with more accessible walks than Alfred Wainwright's. He launched the Walks Around Britain website in 2009, focussing on walks between 2 – 8 miles and on walks with stories rather than the best views. White launched the Walks Around Britain podcast in 2012 and in January 2016 the first series of Walks Around Britain was broadcast, with White presenting and producing.

=== Writing ===
White's first professional writing feature was in Lakeland Walker magazine, followed by Countryfile.

He writes for magazines such as Countryfile, Walk, Coast, RAIL, BBC Sky at Night, Your Dog and Dogs Today.

White was commissioned by AA Publishing to update some of the walks in their book 50 Walks in the Yorkshire Dales in 2013, and in the same year they commissioned him to write a new guide book for Yorkshire. The book was released in 2014. He was commissioned to update the AA Guide to Yorkshire in 2015, published in 2016, and again in 2017, published in 2018.

=== Radio ===
White is a regular guest on BBC Local Radio stations, appearing mostly on BBC Radio Sheffield, BBC Radio Humberside, BBC Radio Leeds, BBC Radio Lincolnshire, BBC Radio York and BBC Radio Manchester mainly talking about walking and the outdoors. Because of his writing on railway topics, BBC Radio Lancashire and BBC Hereford & Worcester often invite White to talk about transport issues, as does on television on the BBC News Channel.

He has also been a panellist on BBC Radio Sheffield's Saturday afternoon panel show Live-ish hosted by Bernie Clifton.

In 2018, White co-produced a documentary for BBC Radio 2 about the 60th anniversary of the children's TV programme Blue Peter.

=== Television ===
White presented and produced a one-off programme, East Yorkshire Walks with Andrew White, in 2015, commissioned by the local TV channel Estuary TV. The programme was intended to be a pilot for a possible series, but Estuary TV were not able to raise the necessary sponsorship to make it happen. The two walks filmed for the programme were subsequently used in the first and second series of Walks Around Britain.

White used the concepts behind East Yorkshire Walks with Andrew White to format a new TV series based on his Walks Around Britain website, and the first episode of the Walks Around Britain TV series was broadcast on 22 January 2016 on Community Channel. He is the lead presenter and presents at least one walk in every episode. White insists on walking every one of the routes in the TV series, so he can write the scripts for the voice-overs, and said that he walks around 2,000 miles a year.

== The Walker Mysteries ==
In 2022, White published a novel, A New World, the first in The Walker Mysteries.

== Personal Appearances ==
White has appeared at literary festivals, taking part in events ranging from workshops to walk and talk events. He also leads walks a walking festivals across the country too.

He is involved in the Get Doncaster Moving campaign, and attends events in the borough to promote walking.

== Ordnance Survey #GetOutside Champion ==
Because of his work in encouraging people to walk, White was chosen to be one of the 60 Ordnance Survey #GetOutside Champions for 2018/9. He continued to be a #GetOutside Champion for 2020 and 2021 through the various lock-downs in the UK, and has been selected to continue through 2022.

== South Yorkshire Way ==
In 2014, White launched the South Yorkshire Way – two interlinked long-distance footpaths in his home county of South Yorkshire. One of the routes – the Boundary Route – follows the border of the county and is 171 miles in length, whilst the Central Route is a 98 miles route through the middle of the county, taking in the four constituent conurbations of Doncaster, Rotherham, Barnsley and Sheffield.

He devised the routes as a response to South Yorkshire often being overlooked for walking, and to celebrate 2014 being the 40th anniversary of the formation of the county of South Yorkshire.

== Awards and honours ==
- MyOutdoors "Best Digital Media Production", 2016 and 2017

== Books ==
- The AA Guide to Yorkshire – first edition, AA Publishing, 2014
- 50 Walks in the Yorkshire Dales, AA Publishing, 2014
- The AA Guide to Yorkshire – second edition, AA Publishing, 2016
- The AA Guide to Yorkshire – third edition, AA Publishing, 2018
- 50 Walks in the Yorkshire Dales, AA Publishing, 2019
- A New World: The Walker Mysteries book 1, Nova Books, 2022

== Filmography ==
Television

Year	Title	Channel	Role
1988	First Class	BBC One	Contestant
1996	Right to Reply	Channel 4	Guest presenter
2015	East Yorkshire Walks with Andrew White	Estuary TV	Presenter
2016	Look North	BBC One	Guest
2016–present	Walks Around Britain	Various channels including Horse & Country TV	Presenter/Producer
2022–present	Walks Around Yorkshire with Andrew White	Together TV and Walks Around Britain+	Presenter/Producer

== Personal life ==
White married Amanda Hugill in 2001 at High Melton, South Yorkshire. They have two daughters, who both regularly appear on Walks Around Britain with their father. In 2024, White announced the couples' separation after 26 years together, and their intention to divorce.

=== Neurodiversity ===
White was diagnosed with having attention deficit hyperactivity disorder and has dyslexia.

=== Neurological Disorders ===
On 31 October 2023, White suffered a seizure, and suffered another on 30 November 2023. He was diagnosed with epilepsy.

=== Gender and Sexuality ===
White came out as a trans woman on Trans Day of Visibility - 31 March 2024. As part of his gender expression, White announced he was using the first name "Andi", although he has said he is happy to continue to use "Andrew". White has stated he is fine with the pronouns he, she or they, until he completes medical transitioning. He has spoken about having significant gender dysphoria throughout his life

White announced on National Coming Out Day that he was pansexual and has stated that "it has always been inside that counts"
