= Walks Around Britain (TV series) =

British documentary series

- Walks Around Britain title screen
- Genre: Walking, Documentary
- Presented by: Andrew White
- Starring: Claire Maxted; Leah Hather; Olivia White; Alannah White; Zoe Dawes; Vikkie Lee; Alan Hinkes
- Country of origin: United Kingdom
- Original language: English
- No. of series: 5
- No. of episodes: 36

Production
- Cinematography: Dave Thorp
- Camera setup: single-camera
- Running time: 22 minutes
- Production company: Nova Productions

Original release
- Network: Community Channel (2016–17); Horse & Country TV (2016–present); Forces TV (2017-present); PBS America (2017–present); Made Television/Local TV Network (2016-present); Amazon Prime Video (2017-present)
- Release: 22 January 2016 – present

Related
- Coast (TV series)

Walks Around Britain is a documentary series about walking that was first broadcast on Community Channel television in 2016. The series is based on the website of the same name and is an integral part of the brand. The series is designed to inspire more viewers to get outside and go walking, and as such features a wide range of routes, but mainly ones which most viewers can actually get out and do.

A second series started in May 2016, a third in early 2017 and a fourth in mid-2018. A fifth series was aired in 2018/2019, and the sixth will form part of the exclusive content produced for the Walks Around Britain+ video on-demand subscription website before being broadcast on linear television.

The series differs from many other programmes about walking as it rarely leaves the walking route at all. This is due to lead presenter and producer Andrew White being fed up with programmes being seemingly about walking, but where the presenter leaves the walk to undertake ghyll scrambling or coasteering. He devised a format guide for the series, with six rules which all the programmes would follow, including "the walk is the star" and "we never do anything a regular walker couldn't" – meaning the presenters don't get an all-access pass to places just because they are on television.

The series is also different in being based on a first-run syndication model – more commonly used in the United States. The relaxing of the rules from the regulator Ofcom in 2011 allows Walks Around Britain to be funded by product placement, with companies ranging from outdoor clothing manufacturers to rail companies paying to be inside the programmes. Once produced, the programmes are licensed to a range of broadcasters in the UK and around the world. Currently, the series is broadcast on 20 channels in the UK, and because dates and times of showings are decided by the individual television stations, it is possible to find the same edition of Walks Around Britain showing on two different channels at the same time.

It covers various subjects relating to both the natural and social history of the walks featured in the programme, and as with the website, the TV series includes walks on the Crown Dependencies of the Isle of Man and the Channel Islands.

In December 2016, the first reversion of the series format, The Great Glen Way – A Walks Around Britain Special, was screened on Community Channel. This took the established format and expanded it to cover one long-distance walking trail – The Great Glen Way between Fort William and Inverness. The usual 22-minute format was expanded to 44 minutes to fit into an hour time slot. Community Channel premiered it at Christmas 2016, with the other broadcasters following afterwards. This led to the idea of producing regular specials featuring some of the other shorter long-distance trails, which often don't get a lot of publicity.

== Presenters ==
The presenters, and the series they have appeared in, are:

- Andrew White (lead presenter, series 1-)
- Leah Hather (presenter, series 1–3, 5-)
- Claire Maxted (presenter, series 5)
- Zoe Dawes (presenter, series 2)
- Alannah White (presenter, series 2–)
- Olivia White (presenter, series 3–4, 6-)
- Vikkie Lee (presenter, series 6-)
- Alan Hinkes (presenter, series 6-)

== Series overview ==
In the main series, each programme lasts 22 minutes and features two walks between 2 to 8 miles – one walk in part one and one in part two. Usually there is a geographical spread between the two in one programme, but on two occasions so far, a specific area was featured as a "special" – most notably in series 3 when two walks on the island of Jersey formed a programme. The walks in an episode are sometimes linked with a theme – as in series 4 with two walks in Yorkshire from railway stations.

Unlike similar series, Walks Around Britain doesn't concentrate on "walks with a view", but instead aims to tell stories. So, a walk in the programme could well have any elements of British heritage, social history and the natural environment, but could just as well include physical health, mental health, wellbeing, engineering, archaeology, popular history and biological anthropology. In that way, the series is more akin to BBC Two's Coast, than other walking series.

Again, like Coast, the series features one lead presenter – currently Andrew White – who introduces the walks and links the programme together. The walks are then either presented by White, or by one of the other regular Walks Around Britain presenters. This was designed to ensure the series' longevity if and when presenters want to move on. To date, White has presented at least one walk in every edition.

The series is designed to encourage and inspire viewers to get outside and do the walks for themselves – so the programmes feature animated maps showing the walking route and on-screen graphics with information about the length, type and time it would on average take to do the walk. It also features the starting point as a grid reference and lists the relevant Ordnance Survey map which would be needed for the walk. Each of the walks have a dedicated page on the Walks Around Britain website with more detailed information.

Walks Around Britain is currently the only walking series in Britain to regularly feature children, as White's own daughters, Alannah and Olivia are often go the walks. It is also the only mainstream walking series to feature dogs – as White's own four border collies frequently go on the walks.

Although broadcasters are encouraged to show the programmes in order, the programmes are designed to be "stand alone", so there isn't any mention of what walks are coming up on the next episode.

All the series have been filmed and edited in high-definition, but have never been transmitted on any broadcast channel in this format as all the broadcasters who show the series are standard-definition only. The series is available in high-definition on Amazon Prime Video and Walks Around Britain+ - the series own video on-demand subscription website, with a selection of editions available free in high-definition on the Walks Around Britain YouTube channel.

=== Series 1 (2016) ===
The first series of Walks Around Britain was originally aired on Community Channel during the winter and spring of 2016. It has subsequently been broadcast on 22 channels in the UK.

The series visited Scotland twice, Wales once and the most southerly walk was on the north coast of Cornwall. Two walks on the Isle of Man also featured.

The part lengths for series 1 vary considerably as most of the walks were remastered from the original Walks Around Britain YouTube channel. This led to programmes in series 1 being edited to fit a 22-minute time slot when they were broadcast on Made Television network.

| No. overall | No. in series | Title | Directed by | Written by | Original release date |
|---|---|---|---|---|---|
| 1 | 1 | "Monsal Trail and Caledonian Canal" | Andrew White | Andrew White | 22 January 2016 |
Andrew White walks on a disused railway in the Peak District and alongside the Caledonian Canal.
| 1 | 2 | "Boscastle and Ramsey" | Andrew White | Andrew White | 29 January 2016 |
Andrew White walks along the coast at Boscastle, Cornwall and visits Ramsey on the Isle of Man.
| 1 | 3 | "Ladybower Reservoir and Windermere" | Andrew White | Andrew White | 5 February 2016 |
Andrew White walks above and alongside 2 large bodies of water - Ladybower Reservoir and Windermere.
| 1 | 4 | "The Great Orme and Haworth to Oakworth" | Andrew White | Andrew White | 12 February 2016 |
Andrew White walks up The Great Orme in North Wales and beside the Keighley & Worth Valley Railway.
| 1 | 5 | "Flamborough Head and Clumber Park" | Dave Thorp & Andrew White | Andrew White | 19 February 2016 |
Andrew White walks along the cliffs at Flamborough Head and through Clumber Park, Nottinghamshire.
| 1 | 6 | "The Coast of the Isle of Man and Sprotbrough" | Andrew White | Andrew White | 26 February 2016 |
Andrew White walks along the Isle of Man's stunning coast and Leah Hather visits Sprotbrough in South Yorkshire.
| 1 | 7 | "Banavie to Gairlochy and the Ribblehead Viaduct." | Andrew White | Andrew White | 4 March 2016 |
Andrew White walks from Banavie to Gairlochy in the Scottish Highlands and around the Ribblehead Viaduct in the Yorkshire Dales.

=== Series 2 (2016) ===
The second series of Walks Around Britain was originally aired on Community Channel during the summer of 2016. It has subsequently been broadcast on 22 channels in the UK.

This series visited Scotland once, Wales once and included a walk on Jersey for the first time. To date, this series has the highest number of walks in a particular National Park – being in this instance the Lake District.

The part lengths and total running times for series 2 settled down to be a constant 11 minutes per part and 22 minutes in total, in order to fit into timeslots correctly when they were broadcast on Made Television network. That structure has continued throughout the series into the future.

The timescales between production and broadcast were so tight on series 2 that presenter Andrew White had to record a voice over for the Wolverhampton walk in programme 3 whilst suffering with a very bad throat, so the original Community Channel broadcast of programme 3 featured this croaky narration. When his vice recovered later, he re-recorded the voice over, and it is this version which is available now.

| No. overall | No. in series | Title | Directed by | Written by | Original release date |
|---|---|---|---|---|---|
| 2 | 1 | "Holmfirth and Wansfell Pike" | Dave Thorp & Andrew White | Andrew White | 27 May 2016 |
Andrew White walks with artist Ashley Jackson in Holmfirth and to the top of Wansfell Pike in the Lake District.
| 2 | 2 | "Goole and Trentham Estate" | Dave Thorp & Andrew White | Andrew White | 3 June 2016 |
Andrew White takes a surprising walk around Goole and through the Trentham Estate in Staffordshire.
| 2 | 3 | "Wolverhampton Canal and Sour Howes" | Andrew White | Andrew White | 10 June 2016 |
Andrew White walks alongside a canal in Wolverhampton and to the top of Sour Howes in the Lake District.
| 2 | 4 | "Brant Fell and Grasmere to Rydal" | Andrew White | Andrew White | 17 June 2016 |
A Lake District Special - Andrew White walks to the top of Brant Fell and Zoe Dawes visits Grasmere and Rydal.
| 2 | 5 | "Carreg Cennen Castle and the Jersey Moonwalk" | Andrew White | Andrew White | 24 June 2016 |
Andrew White walks around Carreg Cennen Castle in the Brecon Beacons and takes an unusual trek in Jersey.
| 2 | 6 | "Coombs Dale and Glenridding Dodd" | Andrew White | Andrew White | 1 July 2016 |
Andrew White walks through the haunted Coombs Dale in the Peak District and to the summit of Glenridding Dodd in the Lake District.
| 2 | 7 | "Muirtown Basin and Hugh Town" | Andrew White | Andrew White | 8 July 2016 |
Andrew White walks around the Muirtown Basin in Inverness and Hugh Town on the Isles of Scilly.

=== Series 3 (2017) ===
The third series of Walks Around Britain was originally aired on Made Television during the spring and summer of 2017. Community Channel – the network which previously premiered the first two series, broadcast it later in the year. Series 3 was the first to be broadcast on PBS America.

This series visited the Isle of Wight for the first time and returned to the Isles of Scilly and the Isle of Man. Jersey featured in a special programme thanks to product placement from Visit Jersey, Flybe, Doncaster Sheffield Airport and Seymore Hotels.

Series three was the first time Walks Around Britain had used CGI – in this instance to bring back trains along the former East Coast Main Line railway line between York and Riccall in episode 6.

| No. overall | No. in series | Title | Directed by | Written by | Original release date |
|---|---|---|---|---|---|
| 3 | 1 | "Silver How and Fishlake" | Andrew White | Andrew White | 12 March 2017 |
Andrew White takes a challenging walk to top of Silver How in the Lake District and Leah Hather walks through Fishlake's interesting history in South Yorkshire.
| 3 | 2 | "Silverdale Glen and Elter Water" | Andrew White | Andrew White | 19 March 2017 |
Andrew walks through the stunning Silverdale Glen on the Isle of Man and takes a winter walk around Elter Water in the Lake District.
| 3 | 3 | "Ningwood to Yarmouth and Huggate to Thixendale" | Andrew White | Andrew White | 26 March 2017 |
Andrew White walks along part of the Isle of Wight Coastal Path between Ningwood to Yarmouth, and part of the Yorkshire Wolds Way between Huggate to Thixendale.
| 3 | 4 | "Tresco and Caer Caradoc" | Andrew White | Andrew White | 2 April 2017 |
Andrew White walks around the island of Tresco - one of the Isles of Scilly - and with his family to the top of Caer Caradoc in Shropshire.
| 3 | 5 | "Jersey Special" | Andrew White | Andrew White | 9 April 2017 |
In a Jersey Special, Andrew White and his family walk to Devil's Hole along the coast and a circular walk near the La Corbière lighthouse.
| 3 | 6 | "Glen Wyllin and York to Riccall" | Andrew White | Andrew White | 16 April 2017 |
Andrew White walks part of an old railway line on the Isle of Man and walks between the Sun and Pluto in North Yorkshire.
| 3 | 7 | "Alderney Forts and Lanercost Priory" | Andrew White | Andrew White | 23 April 2017 |
Andrew White takes a stunning walk discovering the many forts on the small island of Alderney, and walks along part of the Hadrian's Wall in Cumbria.

=== Series 4 (2018) ===
The fourth series of Walks Around Britain was originally aired on Horse & Country TV during the spring and summer of 2018. It coincide with National Walking Month in May. For the first time, the whole of the series featured product placement – from the German sport and leisure wear company Maier Sports. Several of the walks featured in series four also included product placement by the rail company Arriva Rail North.

A disagreement about the syndicated nature of Walks Around Britain led series four to be first not to be shown on the Community Channel under their new branding of Together TV.

The series visited Scotland twice, Wales once, and featured two walks in the borough of Wigan. Essex was featured for the first time, and the series included the first city walk – in Chester.

| No. overall | No. in series | Title | Directed by | Written by | Original release date |
|---|---|---|---|---|---|
| 4 | 1 | "Roxwell and the Leigh Guided Busway" | Andrew White | Andrew White | 3 May 2018 |
Andrew takes a scenic walk around the lovely village of Roxwell in Essex, and an easy bimble alongside the guided busway in Leigh.
| 4 | 2 | "Borsdane Wood and Kenmore Hill" | Andrew White | Andrew White | 10 May 2018 |
Andrew takes a short walk through the ancient Borsdane Wood in Wigan, and then he climb Kenmore Hill in Perth and Kinross, together with his dogs and his daughter Olivia.
| 4 | 3 | "Daneshill Lakes and Haxey" | Andrew White | Andrew White | 17 May 2018 |
Andrew, his dogs and his daughter Olivia take a wildlife-filled walk around Daneshill Lakes in Nottinghamshire, and then Andrew tours around the historic Lincolnshire village of Haxey.
| 4 | 4 | "Hartsholme Country Park and the Falls of Acharn" | Andrew White | Andrew White | 24 May 2018 |
Andrew, his daughter Olivia and the dogs take a walk around Hartsholme Country Park in the city of Lincoln, and then Andrew's other daughter Alannah joins them all for a climb to the Falls of Acharn in Perth and Kinross.
| 4 | 5 | "Denby Dale and Saltburn-by-the-Sea" | Andrew White | Andrew White | 31 May 2018 |
Andrew goes on two walks straight from railway stations in Yorkshire – one in the countryside of Denby Dale and the other on the coast along the Cleveland Way at Saltburn-by-the-Sea.
| 4 | 6 | "South Stack to North Stack and Thor's Cave" | Andrew White | Andrew White | 7 June 2018 |
Andrew and his youngest daughter Olivia walk between the headlands of South and North Stack on Anglesey, and then Andrew's other daughter Alannah joins them, and the dogs, for a walk in Staffordshire to Thor's Cave.
| 4 | 7 | "Buxton and Chester city walls" | Andrew White | Andrew White | 14 June 2018 |
Andrew takes two walks direct from railway stations - one around the Derbyshire spa town of Buxton and the other along the Roman walls of Chester.

=== Series 5 (2018/9) ===
The fifth series of Walks Around Britain was originally aired on Horse & Country TV during the winter of 2018/2019.

Some of the walks featured product placement from Ford of Britain using a new Tourneo Custom.

This series featured a walk on each of the islands of Jersey and Alderney, but there were no walks in Scotland or Wales. This series saw the last of the walks originally filmed for the Walks Around Britain YouTube channel used, and from now on all the walks have been specially filmed for the TV series.

| No. overall | No. in series | Title | Directed by | Written by | Original release date |
|---|---|---|---|---|---|
| 5 | 1 | "Pennington Flash and Windermere to Orrest Head" | Andrew White | Andrew White | 25 November 2018 |
Andrew White takes a nature-filled walk around Pennington Flash in Leigh and to the summit of Orrest Head from Windermere railway station.
| 5 | 2 | "Wadworth and Rutland Water" | Andrew White | Andrew White | 9 December 2018 |
Andrew White walks around the village of Wadworth in South Yorkshire and Claire Maxted discovers the wildlife and history of Rutland Water.
| 5 | 3 | "La Hougue Bie to Gorey and Mam Tor" | Andrew White | Andrew White | 16 December 2018 |
Andrew White walks between two historic sites on Jersey - La Hougue Bie and Gorey, while Leah Hather treks through the snow to Mam Tor in the Peak District.
| 5 | 4 | "Langsett Reservoir and Dovestone Reservoir" | Andrew White | Andrew White | 23 December 2018 |
The team walk around two reservoirs on the outskirts of the Peak District National Park. Andrew White walks around Langsett Reservoir in South Yorkshire and Leah Hather walks around Dove Stone Reservoir in Greater Manchester.
| 5 | 5 | "Alderney's south east coast and Rother Valley Country Park" | Andrew White | Andrew White | 6 January 2019 |
Andrew White joins Martin Batt for a walk along the south west coast of Alderney and then journeys to Rotherham for a walk around Rother Valley Country Park.
| 5 | 6 | "Upper Hambleton and Misterton to West Stockwith" | Andrew White | Andrew White | 13 January 2019 |
Claire Maxted walks around the village of Upper Hambleton on the shores of Rutland Water, while Andrew White walks alongside a canal and two rivers between Misterton and West Stockwith in Nottinghamshire.
| 5 | 7 | "Rufford Abbey Country Park and Rawcliffe" | Andrew White | Andrew White | 20 January 2019 |
Alannah White and Mac walk around the grounds of Rufford Abbey Country Park in Nottinghamshire, while Andrew White visits the town of Rawcliffe for a walk alongside the River Aire.

== International broadcast ==
Walks Around Britain airs of several channels around the world, including Channel 39 and Shine TV in New Zealand.

== On demand availability ==
Walks Around Britain has been available on demand via Amazon Prime Video since 2017. Series four and five are available to stream on demand on Planet Knowledge – the free to watch video on demand channel on Freeview HD channel 265. In keeping with other content owners, the series' producers Nova Productions launched a subscription on demand website, called Walks Around Britain+, which features all new editions of the series first before broadcast television.

== Former broadcasters ==
Walks Around Britain previously aired on several channels in the UK which were subsequently taken over by the That's TV group, including Estuary TV, Mustard TV, Cambridge TV and Bay TV Swansea. Upon take over by That's TV, broadcast of many series from the former channel, including Walks Around Britain, were stopped.

Upon rebranding to Together TV in 2018, the former Community Channel decided to stop showing Walks Around Britain after a dispute with the makers as to the format of the show and the lack of exclusivity for the channel.
