= Margery Hill =

Hill in South Yorkshire, England

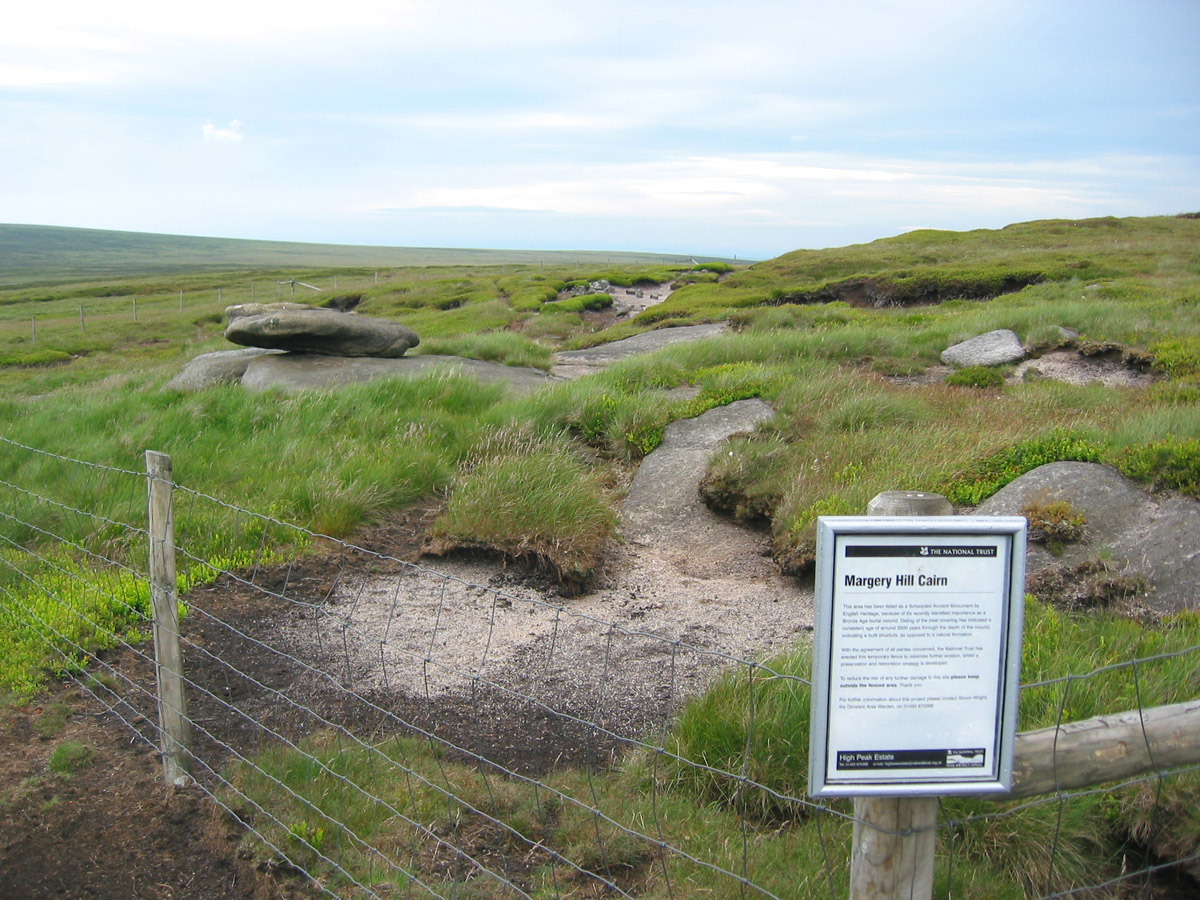
- Margery Hill cairn

Highest point
- Elevation: 546 m (1,791 ft)
- Prominence: 19 m
- Parent peak: Kinder Scout
- Coordinates: 53°27′27″N 1°43′00″W

Geography
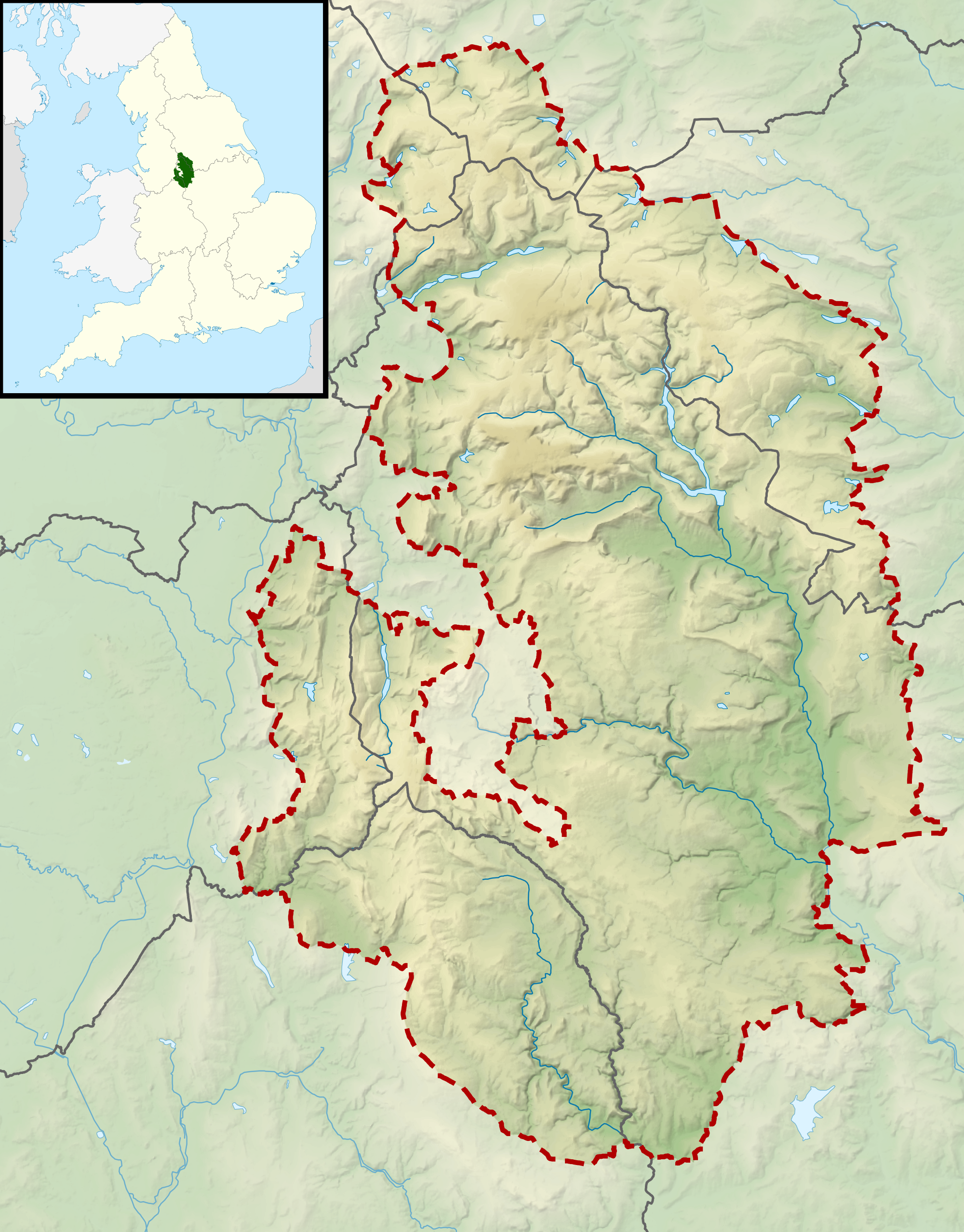
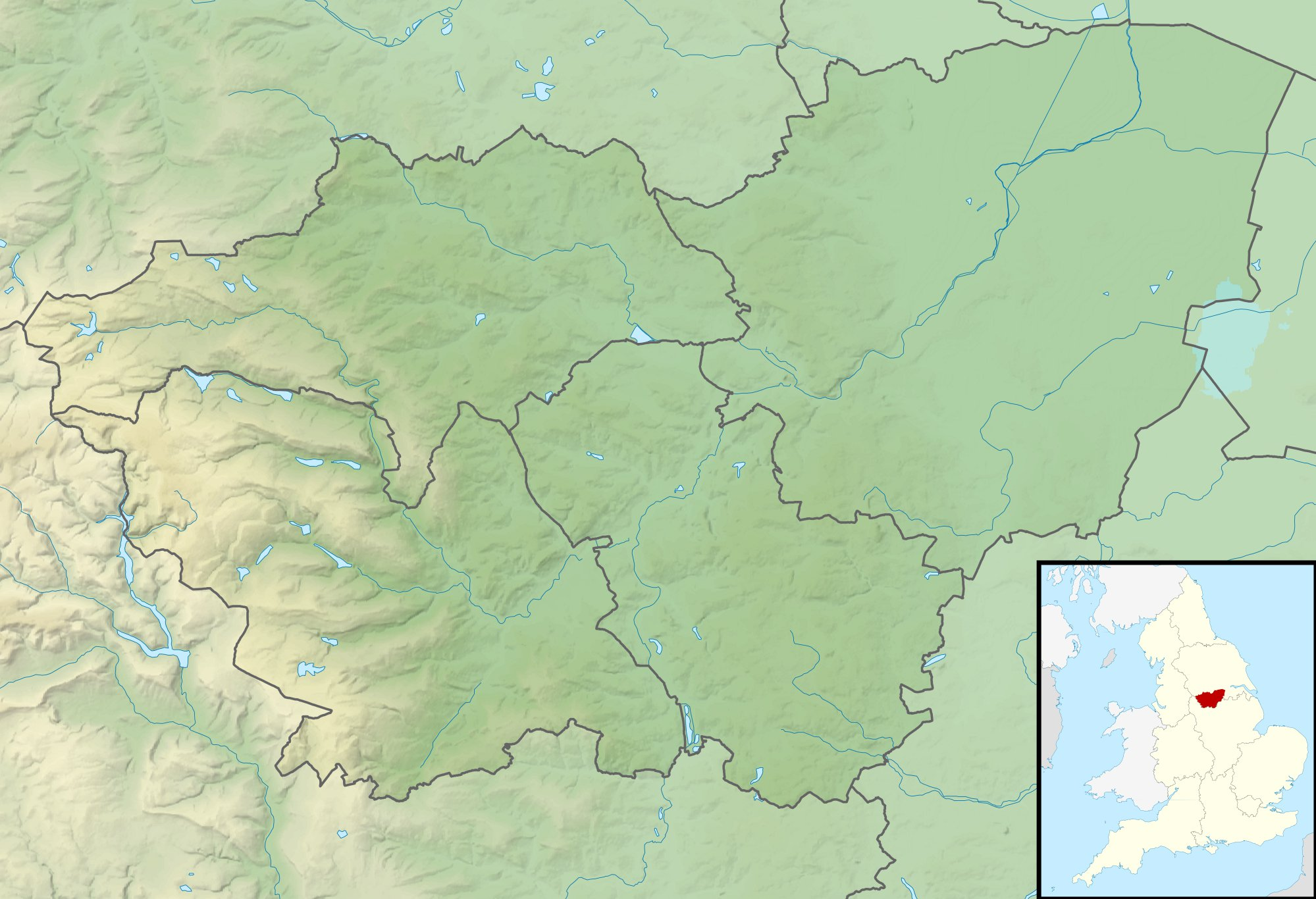
- Location within the Peak District Location within South Yorkshire
- Location: South Yorkshire, England
- Parent range: Peak District
- OS grid: SK 189 956

Margery Hill /ˈmɑːrɡəri/ is a 546-metre (1,791 ft) hill on the Howden Moors in South Yorkshire, England. It lies towards the northern boundary of the Peak District National Park, between Langsett Reservoir to the northeast and Howden Reservoir to the southwest. The area is managed by the National Trust as part of their High Peak Estate.

Peat near the summit cairn has been dated to a uniform age of about 3,500 years old, indicating that it was constructed rather than natural; it is believed to have been part of a Bronze Age burial mound. The area has been designated a Scheduled Ancient Monument by English Heritage.

Margery Hill is the highest marked point within the boundaries of the City of Sheffield. The land rises slightly to 550 metres (1,800 ft) about 0.9 miles (1.5 km) to the south, near High Stones.
