= Old Hay Brook =

River in Sheffield, England

Coordinates: 53.318°N 1.533°W

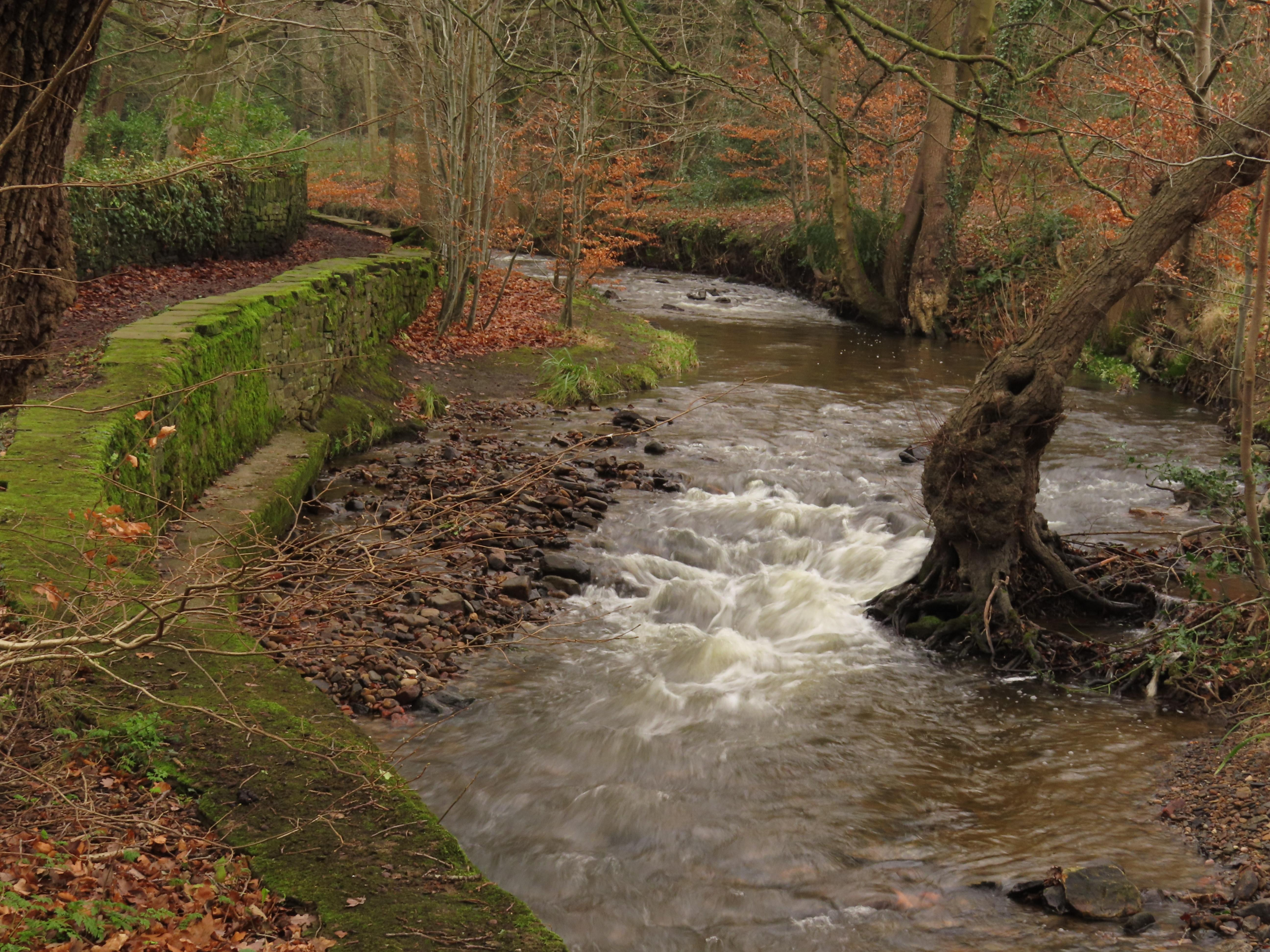
- A view of the river

Location
- Country: England

Physical characteristics
- Source
  - location: Moors to south of Sheffield
  - elevation: 1,300 feet (400 m)
- Mouth
  - location: River Sheaf at Totley Rise
  - coordinates
  - elevation: 410 feet (125 m)

Basin features
- Tributaries
  - right: Needham's Dyke

The Old Hay Brook is a small river in Sheffield, South Yorkshire, England. It is formed from the Redcar Brook, Blacka Dike and another stream, which rise on moors to the south of Sheffield, and is joined by Needham's Dyke near Totley Grange. At Totley Rise it joins Totley Brook, to become the River Sheaf. Water from the river was used to power mills processing lead, corn and paper from at least the 17th century, which were later used for grinding scythes as the Sheffield metal industry expanded. All the mills were defunct by 1900, although some remnants including weirs and dams are still visible.

== Route ==
The river rises as a series of streams on a gritstone ridge some 6 or 7 miles (10 or 11 km) to the south-west of central Sheffield. Furthest north is the Redcar Brook, which rises at four locations near the 1,300-foot (400 m) contour on Houndkirk Moor. The brook flows to the east and then to the south, passing to the west of Townhead. To the south of Redcar Brook, Blacka Dike rises at multiple springs close to the A6187 Hathersage Road, near the 1,210-foot (370 m) contour on Blacka Moor. It flows to the north-east into Black Plantation, where it is joined by several more streams which rise in the woods. It then flows east to join Redcar Brook. Further south, another stream rises by the 1,150-foot (350 m) contour on Totley Moor above Totley railway tunnel. It flows north-east, to join Blacka Dike just before its junction with Redcar Brook. On modern maps, the combined streams are called Blacka Dike to the west of the bridge where they pass under Old Hay Road, and are known as Old Hay Brook to the east of it. Just above the bridge is a smaller footbridge, built in the late 18th century of squared stone and ashlar masonry. It has a single arch, was restored in the 20th century, and is a grade II listed structure.

Needham's Dike rises at two springs on the slopes near Brown Edge, and flows north east. It is crossed by two minor roads, before it crosses the route of Totley Tunnel near to its eastern portal. It then passes under Old Hay Road to join Old Hay Brook. The combined stream runs to the south of the Totley Brook estate, and then crosses over the tunnel entrance cutting in an aqueduct. Continuing eastwards, it passes under the A621 road to reach Totley Rise, where it joins the Totley Brook stream, and the two become the River Sheaf, which descends to join the River Don in Sheffield.

The channel is heavily engineered near the railway, passing over a series of stepped weirs, constructed of bricks, on either side of the aqueduct. The aqueduct itself is a large U-shaped structure, which is also constructed of bricks.

== Water power ==
There were at least four mills on the Old Hay Brook, which were powered by its water. Weirs were constructed to feed water into dams, and was then used to turn water wheels. The word "dam" was used in the Sheffield area to refer to the pond which impounded the water, rather than the structure which created the pond. Mills were used for producing paper, processing lead, grinding corn, and with the rise of the metal industries in Sheffield, for grinding scythes. The earliest records of milling date from the late 16th century, and all of the mills had ceased to operate by 1900.

- Totley Forge was a paper mill in the 17th century, as it was sold in 1653 to Michael Burton of Holmesfield. In 1714, it was owned by the Banks family from Scofton, near Worksop, Nottinghamshire, and was later owned by Richard Bagshawe, who mortgaged it, and his debts had to be repaid by his family. It was offered for sale in 1830, when it was suggested that it could be turned into a grinding wheel, but it had been converted into a scythe forge by 1839 and continued working until 1891 when Joseph Tyzack incorporated the premises into Avenue Farm. The tilt shop and buildings were rebuilt as barns in 1901 and have since been restored as stables. Visible remains of the mill include the stone overflow shuttle from the upper dam, the lower dam and a channel which fed water from the wheel back into a stream.
- Old Hay Wheel was in use as a lead smelting mill by 1585 and was owned by the Earl of Shrewsbury. By the 1650s, it was being operated by John Bright, but on his retirement, it was sold to Michael Burton, with the neighbouring paper mill. With the paper mill, it was mortgaged to the Dowager Duchess of Devonshire by Richard Bagshawe, and lead milling had ended by 1805. Shortly before 1830 a grinding wheel to make saws was operational on the site, and in 1872 it was used for grinding scythes. The site closed in 1895, after which most of the buildings were demolished in 1909, and the dam had been filled in by 1933, and is now grassed. The damaged remains of the weir are still visible, but the site of the wheel buildings is now occupied by a house. Some nearby cottages which were contemporary with the wheel have been converted into another house.
- Upper Mill was a corn mill in 1625. Like the previous two, it was sold to Michael Burton in 1653, but its history from 1693 until 1816 is unknown, as it is not mentioned in any of the records. In 1816, it was owned by Alex Barker and was being operating as a corn mill by John Barker. By 1839 production had changed, and it had become known as Totley Scythe Mill. The mill was demolished in the 1860s, and became the site of a large house called Totley Dale in 1871. It had become Grove House by 1876 and Totley Grove by 1898. The mill was supplied with water from both Old Hay Brook and Needham's Dyke.
- Nether Mill was a lead smelting mill from 1658, although it was called Burton House lead smelting works or Dore Smelting Mill at the time. Again, nothing is known of it throughout the 18th century, but by 1800 it was owned by the Duke of Devonshire of Chatsworth House, and was operating as a scythe mill and cinder hills. By 1809 it had become Nether Corn Mill and cinder hills, and was listed as a scythe mill in 1820. Plans for the construction of the Sheffield and Bakewell Railway called it a grinding wheel in 1845, and it was still shown on plans when the Chatsworth estate sold land beside the Old Hay Brook in 1870. Four years later, they had been removed from sale plans, so had presumably been demolished. All traces of the mill were destroyed when the Hope Valley Line and the houses of the Totley Brook estate were built in the 1890s, but the weir and part of the dam remain.

== Bibliography ==
- Ball, Christine; Crossley, David; Flavell, Neville (2006). Water Power on the Sheffield Rivers: Second Edition. South Yorkshire Industrial History Society. ISBN 978-0-9556644-0-3.
