= Totley =

Suburb of Sheffield in South Yorkshire, England

Coordinates: 53.31°N 1.54°W

- Suburb
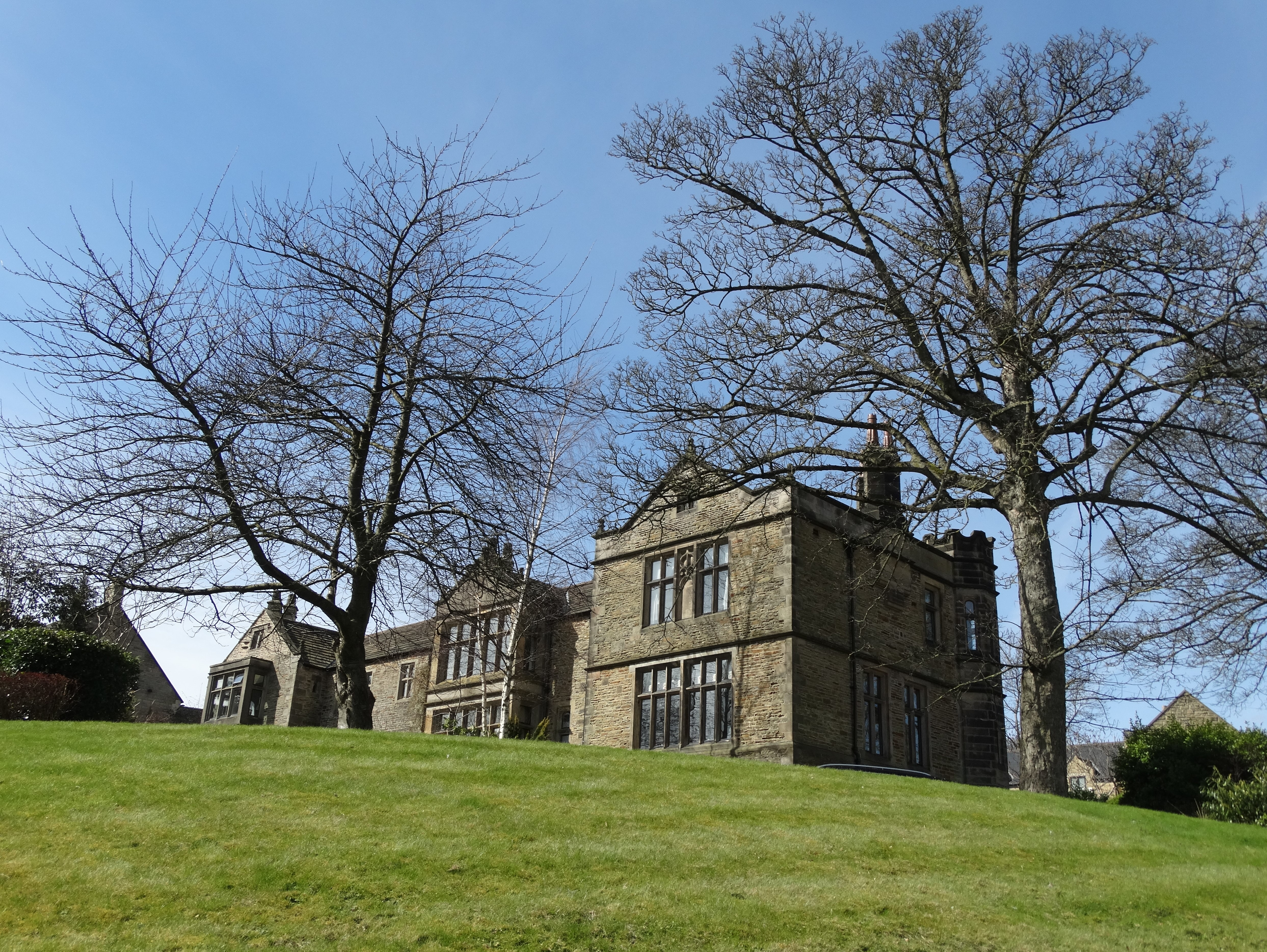
- Totley Hall

- Location within South Yorkshire
- OS grid reference: SK3079
- Metropolitan borough: Sheffield
- Metropolitan county: South Yorkshire
- Region: Yorkshire and the Humber
- Country: England
- Sovereign state: United Kingdom
- Post town: SHEFFIELD
- Postcode district: S17
- Dialling code: 0114
- Police: South Yorkshire
- Fire: South Yorkshire
- Ambulance: Yorkshire
- UK Parliament: Sheffield Hallam

Totley is a suburb on the extreme southwest of the city of Sheffield, in South Yorkshire, England. Lying within the historic county boundaries of Derbyshire, Totley was amalgamated into the city of Sheffield in 1933, and is today part of the Dore and Totley electoral ward in the city, though it remains close to the contemporary county boundary of Derbyshire. Totley had a population of 7,963 in 2011.

Totley was mentioned in the Domesday Book of 1086 as Totinglee, the name meaning a forest clearing belonging to Tota (probably the Saxon lord). Totley Hall, built in 1623 and enlarged in the 19th century, was converted to a teacher training college in the 1950s and was latterly part of Sheffield Hallam University.

Through the district run the Totley Brook and the Old Hay Brook, which meet here to form the River Sheaf. Totley also lends its name to Totley Tunnel, which from 1893 to 2007 was the longest underland main line rail tunnel in the United Kingdom, taking the Sheffield to Manchester line from Totley underneath Totley Moor to Grindleford in Derbyshire. However, there are now longer rail tunnels in Kent and Greater London that were bored in connection with the Channel Tunnel Rail Link (HS1) which opened in 2007, and with the Elizabeth Line (Crossrail) which opened in 2022.

== History and geography ==
Totley was first referred to in the Domesday Survey, commissioned by William the Conqueror, where it was named as Totingelei. It has since had many spellings:

- 1086 Totingelei
- 1221 Totenleg
- 1234 Totingly
- 1275 Tottle
- 1293 Totleye
- 1320 Toteleye
- 1476 Tottynley
- 1487 Totteley
- 1585 Tottley
- 1629 Totles
- 1641 Tottingley

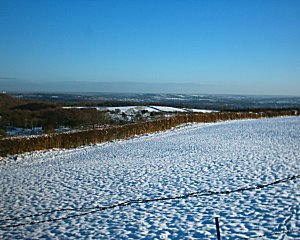
Totley Moor looking towards Sheffield in winter 2005. The moors are a barren wasteland with little vegetation but heather and trees near brooks and streams.

The Domesday book says: In Totinglei, Tolf had IV bovates of land hidable. Land for one plough. It is waste, wood, pasturable, 1 mile in length and half a mile in breadth. T.R.E. value X shillings now XII pence.

The area of Totley in 1086 was quite small, but by 1839 had grown seven-fold. The borders of Totley are agreed to be the Old Hay Brook, Totley Brook, Brown Edge, Lady Cross, Stony Ridge, along Hathersage Road and Blacka Dike. The lowest point is the junction between Old Hay Brook and Totley Brook (beginning of the River Sheaf) at 400 ft, the highest point is Flask Edge at 1300 ft.

The underground is rich, and Totley Brick Works still produce bricks and ceramics to this day.

At one time, Totley was a township in the parish of Dronfield, in the hundred of Scarsdale, a sub-division of the county of Derbyshire. In 1866 Totley became a separate civil parish, on 1 April 1934 the parish was abolished and merged with Sheffield and Holmesfield. In 1931 the parish had a population of 1451. Totley, along with Dore and Bradway became part of Hallam Ward, part of the City of Sheffield and the West Riding of Yorkshire. It is now in the unparished area of Sheffield.

Totley is made of Totley Village (Hillfoot Road and Totley Hall Lane), Totley Moor (unpopulated), Totley Bents (Penny Lane), New Totley (called as such since the 30s) and Totley Rise (Baslow Road shops and Lower Bradway Bank).

=== Cannon Hall ===
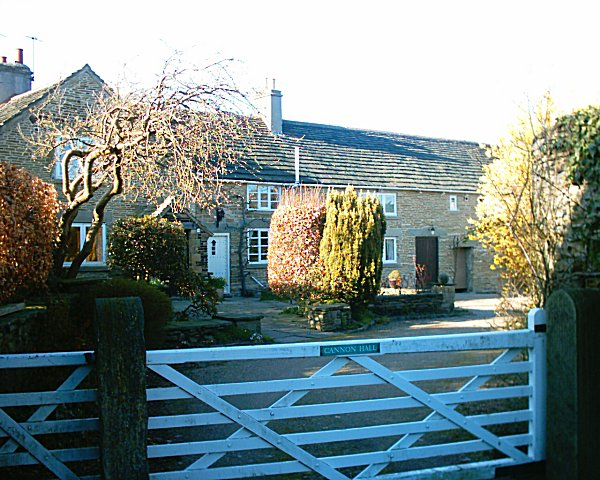
Cannon Hall

Parish and council records show that the Pearson family has lived in Totley since at least 1550 and still live in the village. Samuel Pearson farmed the area in 1550. In 1897, George Creswick bought the house and the land.

=== Totley Hall ===
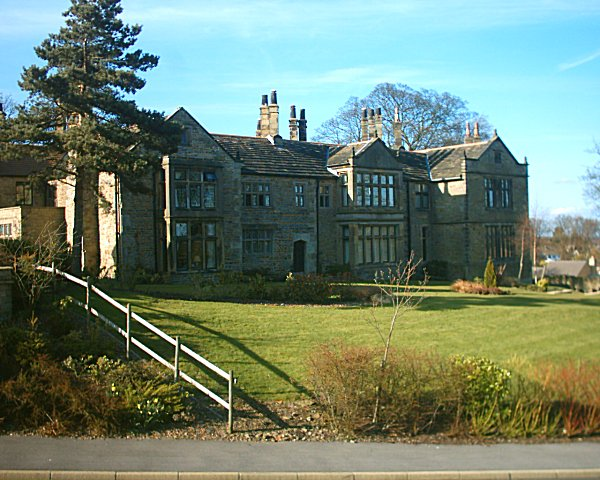
Totley Hall

Totley Hall is generally believed to date back to at least 1623, as this date is carved over the Tudor arched doorway on the building's main facade. The carvings bear the characters GN 1623 WM, which seems to mean George Newbould. However the hall was the home of the Barker family, who were the squires of Dore and Totley for many generations. Which also seems to suggest the construction of the hall could have been commissioned by Edward Barker of Dore Hall, the current squire in 1623. The Barker family left their coat of arms above the fireplace in the main entrance lobby. The hall passed out of the ownership of the Barker family in the late 18th century. The hall was extended by John Dodsley Webster in 1883 and 1894. According to maps, fields have existed before this date as well as small buildings which would have been farm buildings.

In 1791, Andrew Gallimore left the estate to his niece Hannah, wife of the Rev. D'Ewes Coke of Nottinghamshire. Coke died in 1811, and his son, another D'Ewes Coke, took over the hall and provided money for the construction of the infant school. The family sold the Totley Hall in 1881 to W.K. Marples for £2250. It is at this period that the hall and the farm became two distinct properties.

William Aldam Milner built the lodge on Totley Hall Lane in 1887. His son was killed in the First World War and as a sign of thanks the saddened community gave land and £2000 to build a new church. All Saints church opened in 1924. Milner died in 1931. The hall with 160 acres of land was bought by Sheffield Corporation for £5850 in July 1944. Until 1999, Totley Hall was owned by Sheffield Polytechnic which became Sheffield Hallam University in 1991. Sheffield Hallam University sold the property to developers who converted the hall into luxury apartments.

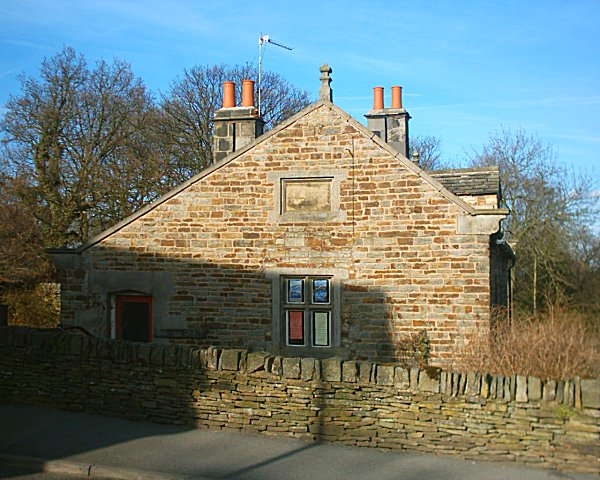
Old Totley School

=== The Old School House ===
The Infant School was built in 1821. The first contingent of pupils were 11 boys and 19 girls as well as one school mistress. Hannal Wild taught there in 1833; in 1852 Ann Padley took over and stayed for 20 years.

=== Totley Grange ===
Totley Grange was built between 1883 and 1888 by Thomas Earnshaw, together with its Lodge, on the land which he had purchased north of the Baslow to Sheffield turnpike road. He also built stables, a stable yard and a coach house, accessed via Butts Hill past Cannon Hill farm, together with a range of glasshouses within the walled garden. An indenture dated 2 April 1875 confirmed absolute sale by Thomas Andrews to Thomas Earnshaw of land and hereditaments at Totley of more than two acres bounded to the north and east by land of Ebenezer Hall and to the south by the turnpike road. On 31 December 1875 the freehold was conveyed to Thomas Earnshaw at a cost of £946.17 shillings and sixpence. Another conveyance between Ebenezer Hall to Thomas Earnshaw was of the freehold ground, buildings and hereditaments dated 27 March 1878 of a little over 3 acres, which included Moorview house and the six cottages of Shrewsbury Terrace. The land abutted Thomas Earnshaw’s previous purchase to the south. It was on this land, that between 1883 and 1888 Thomas Earnshaw built Totley Grange and its Lodge. In March 1879 Thomas Earnshaw purchased an acre of land from Helen and Charles Beckett which included a dwelling house (subsequently demolished) and the terrace of houses facing the Cross Scythes public house; to which he added Grange Terrace, a row of eight houses.

Additionally, from John Howard, Thomas Earnshaw purchased land to the east of the 1 acre plot, of a little over 4 acres, which subsequently became the site of the Totley Primary School. During the Second World War Totley Grange was used for essential war work by JG Graves, assembling wire bundles for a range of aircraft. In 1948 the trustees of the Thomas Earnshaw trust converted Totley Grange into five flats. Finally in 1965 Totley Grange, the Lodge and all of the outbuildings and gardens, amounting to approximately 6 acres were purchased by George Wimpey and it is on this land the Totley Grange estate of 65 houses was built.

=== All Saints Church ===
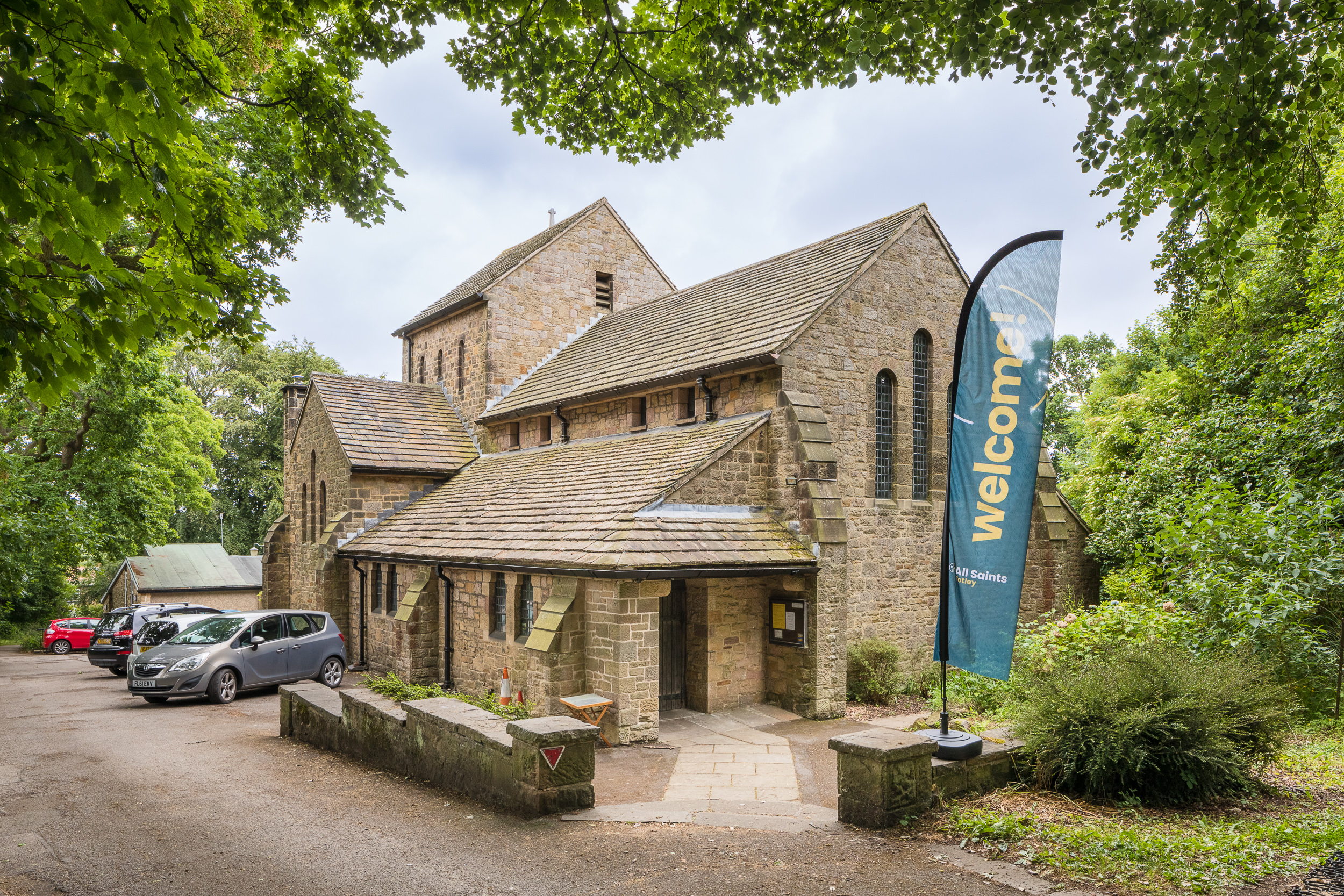
All Saints Church

The parish of Totley is served by All Saints Church, a Church of England church. The Rev’d Jermyn Hutton, the parish's first vicar was appointed on Sunday, 23 March 1924.

On Saturday, 15 November 1924 the church building was consecrated by The Lord Bishop of Southwell. The church building is built on land given by Mr. & Mrs. Milner of Totley Hall. The Chancel is dedicated to their younger son, Sec. Lt. Roy Milner, who was killed in the First World War.

The church maintains links with the Totley All Saints School and Totley Primary School. They run sessions in the library for the elderly in the community and for the Mickley Hall care home. In 2024 with the huge rise in children and young people attending the church their first children's youth and families minister was appointed who serves the community alongside the Rev'd Ben Tanner, present vicar of Totley.

=== Totley Library ===
In 2014 Sheffield City Council announced the intended closure of Totley Library. A community interest company Totley Community Resource and Information Centre was formed by local residents to take over the running of the library and is supported by over 100 volunteers.

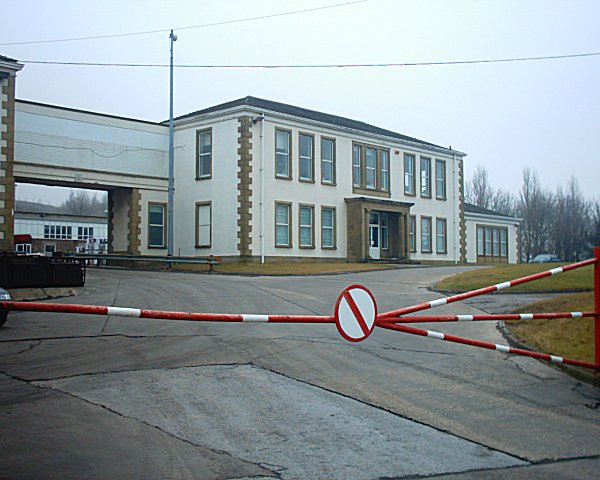
Totley Brick Works on Baslow Road

== Industry ==
As a rural village the main industry has historically been agriculture, and several farms remain in Totley As of 2024. As well as agriculture, the brooks running through the village have been used as a source of power for small industrial operations since at least the 17th century. In particular, several mills have stood on Old Hay Brook, engaged in activities such as lead smelting, corn grinding, blade manufacture and paper rolling. The only industry still open is the Totley Brick Works on Baslow Road. This plant supplied the bricks for the construction of Totley Tunnel and currently produces heat-resistant bricks from materials mined outside of the area. .
