= Walks Around Britain =

Website for walkers in Great Britain

- Website type: Walking
- Available in: English
- Headquarters: Doncaster, South Yorkshire
- Owner: Nova Productions
- Key people: Andrew White
- Products: Multi-platform media: website, digital, TV, social media, podcasts, DVD
- Website: www.walksaroundbritain.co.uk
- Registration: Optional
- Launched: August 2009

Walks Around Britain is a website for walkers in Great Britain, established in 2009. It caters for established walkers and for people who want to take up leisure walking for the first time. Rather uniquely for a walking brand, it focuses on walks between 2 – 8 miles, and is welcoming to families and dog-owners too. Walks Around Britain is positioned below its' print-based rival Country Walking magazine, and often features walks in places of Britain other publications and TV series rarely show.

The website also features walks on the Isle of Man and the Channel Islands, even though they aren't part of Britain, but are Crown Dependencies. Walks in Northern Ireland feature in the sister site Walks Around Ireland despite being part of the United Kingdom. It is owned by Nova Productions, the Doncaster-based independent media producer.

== History ==
The idea behind Walks Around Britain was formed in 2006, when the life-long walker Andrew White was looking at various walking websites. Intent on doing something different, White looked for a suitable domain name and found that www.walksaroundbritain.co.uk was available, so he registered it in April 2006.

White's ideas of what to do grow whilst watching the Wainwright Walks series on BBC Four in 2007, presented by Julia Bradbury. With his first child at the age of four at the time, he decided to build a website featuring much more accessible walks than Alfred Wainwright promoted in his guide books. Still very much a passion project in his spare time, Walks Around Britain took more shape with the creation of Twitter, Facebook and YouTube accounts for the brand in 2009. the growth of these social media accounts convinced White to take his idea further.

== Website ==
The Walks Around Britain website was launched in August 2009, and initially featured a few pages of walking information. By the end of the year, 10-minute videos of walks hosted on the Walks Around Britain YouTube channel were being embedded into the pages, along with route directions.

Today, the Walks Around Britain website features all the routes from the TV series with printable route directions and a map of the route. Short videos showing what walkers can expect on the routes are embedded in the website. The walking information section has been greatly expanded, and there's a walking festival calendar too. The Walks Around Britain podcast was added in 2012, and in 2018 an online shop selling associated merchandise and products.

According to the website, www.walksaroundbritain.co.uk sees on average 20,000 unique visitors a month, so it ranks favourably with its print rivals Country Walking magazine.

== Walks Around Britain podcast ==
In 2012, Walks Around Britain launched its own podcast, which is hosted on audioBoom. Based on a traditional Radio 4-style magazine programme, the podcast is presented by Andrew White and features interviews with walking and outdoor people, as well as information about places to go walking. The podcast has been sporadic since the television series has arrived, but finally returned to its once every month release in March 2019.

In October 2017, Nova Productions announced it was considering a radio series to follow the podcast format, but to date this hasn't materialised.

== Walks Around Britain TV series ==
In January 2016, a television series based on the website began broadcasting on Community Channel, using walks previously filmed for the YouTube channel together with some new walks. The series was popular and so a second series was ordered pretty much straight away. Today, there have been five series and Walks Around Britain has been broadcast on 20 channels in the UK as well as in the United States, Australia and New Zealand.

== Walks Around Britain+ subscription video website ==
In November 2018, Nova Productions announced it intended to launch a Subscription video on demand website for Walks Around Britain, which would have access to the back catalogue of TV programmes as well as the first look at new editions. This was soft launched in December 2018, and launched proper in February 2019.

In November 2019, it was renamed Walks Around Britain+, in keeping with the naming conventions of similar streaming services.

== Walks Around Britain Awards ==
With 2019 being the 10th anniversary of Walks Around Britain, there have been soundings that Nova Productions was forming plans for a Walks Around Britain Awards, along the lines of Countryfile and The Great Outdoors magazines, but concentrating more of the Walks Around Britain target audience.

Walks Around Britain announced in March 2022 the first awards would be held in 2022.

== International editions ==
With the success of Walks Around Britain, Nova Productions has plans to export the format to other countries - most notably Ireland, with a website and a television series.
