= High Stones =

Hill in South Yorkshire, England

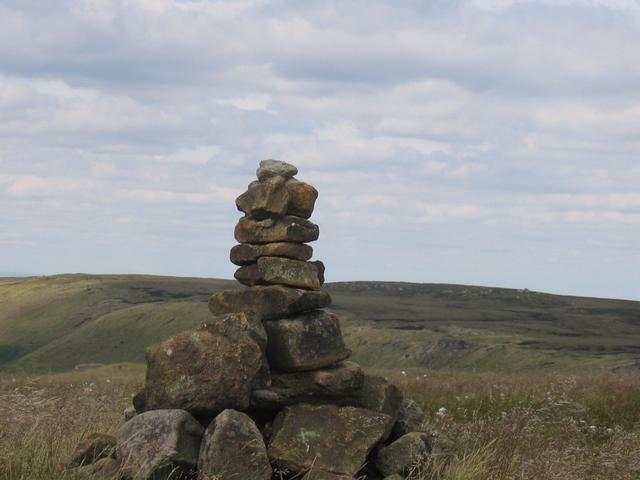
- High Stones, Sheffield

Highest point
- Elevation: 548 m (1,798 ft)
- Coordinates: 53°26′43″N 1°43′06″W

Geography
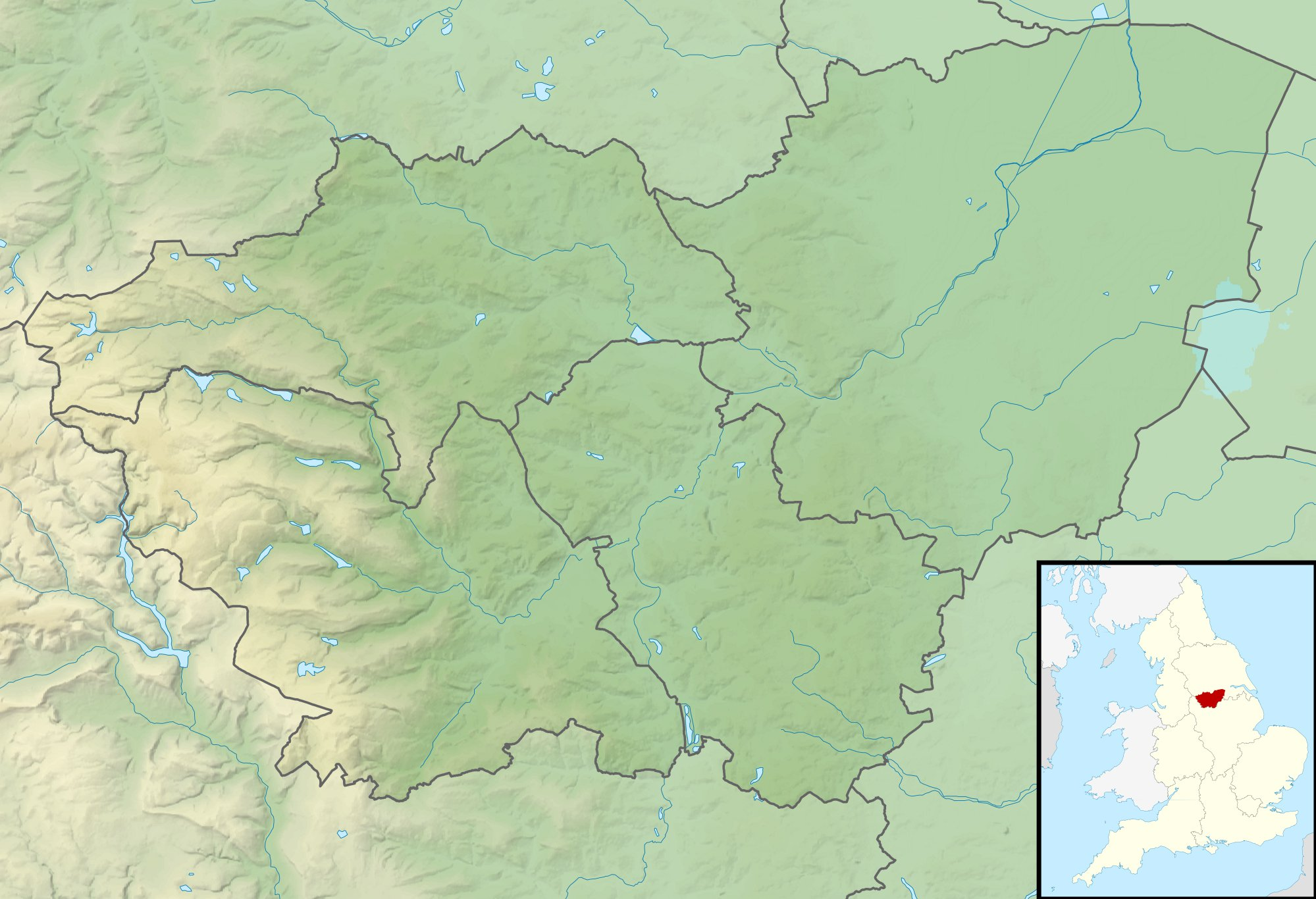
- Location within South Yorkshire
- Location: South Yorkshire, England
- Parent range: Peak District
- OS grid: SK188943

High Stones, at 548 metres (1,798 ft), is the highest point within the boundaries of both the City of Sheffield and South Yorkshire, England.

High Stones lies on the Howden Moors towards in the northern Peak District National Park, between Langsett Reservoir to the north-east and Howden Reservoir to the south-west. The area is managed by the National Trust, as part of the Nether Hey area of their High Peak Estate.

== Representation on mapping ==
High Stones is about 1 mile (1.6 km) south of Margery Hill which, at 546m, is the highest marked point within Sheffield. High Stones is only shown on 1:25,000 scale maps and larger.

The cairn at High Stones is at the marked 548 metres (1,798 ft) point; being something over two feet tall means that the top of the cairn is just over 1800 ft above sea level. The most recent 1:25,000 Ordnance Survey Map shows a small 550m contour just west of the High Stones marked point, meaning that small patch of moorland is the highest point in Sheffield at just slightly over 550 metres (1,804 ft).
