= Horse & Country TV =

Equestrian sports streaming service and TV channel

- Country: United Kingdom
- Broadcast area: United Kingdom; Republic of Ireland; The Netherlands; Sweden; Australia; Germany; United States; Canada; The Philippines

Programming
- Picture format: 1080i HDTV (downscaled to 16:9 576i for the SDTV feed)

Ownership
- Owner: H&C TV Ltd.

History
- Launched: 7 July 2007; 19 years ago

Links
- Website: Website

Availability

Terrestrial
- Cignal TV Philippines: Channel 100 (planned)
- TrueVisions Thailand: Channel 557 (planned)

Streaming media
- Ziggo GO Netherlands: ZiggoGO.tv (Europe only)

Horse & Country (H&C) is an equestrian sports digital media company.

== Distribution ==
H&C is accessible via their subscription service, H&C+, via a free linear TV channel available on some platforms across various territories, and via Amazon Prime. In the UK, the Horse & Country linear TV channel is accessible on LG televisions on channel 1639, and on the Free Live Sports network. In the EU, it is accessible via Netgem, xiaomi and Sports Studio. In the US, it is accessed via Roku, Netgem, Free Movies+ and Vizio. In Australia and New Zealand, it is available on Fetch TV, Samsung TV Plus and LG televisions.

== Programming & production ==
H&C continuously commission shows & series intended to provide equestrian entertainment and offer training and advice regarding equestrian sport. Names such as Laura Collett, Tom McEwen, Ros Canter, Cameron Beer, Simon Grieve, Carl Hester and Megan Elphick regularly feature in content. H&C+ are also the exclusive streaming partners of live equestrian sporting events from around the world, including the Rolex series and Rolex Grand Slam Show, London International Horse Show, Royal Windsor Horse Show, British Dressage events, Adelaide Equestrian Festival, several CCI4* events including Defender Bramham International Horse Trials, Belsay International Horse Trials, Cornbury House Horse Trials, The Eventing Spring Carnival at Thoresby, and Burnham Market International Horse Trials, among various showjumping, dressage, carriage-driving, showing and racing events.

== 2010 restructuring ==
In October 2010, Horse & Country TV was placed into administration by Chairman Heather Killen after she called in a £400,000 preferential loan on her own company, one day before a dismissal claim by former Managing Director Nick Ludlow was scheduled for court. Mr. Ludlow, who had been dismissed by Ms. Killen seven days after she completed a takeover of the television channel, alleged that his 47% ownership stake was diluted to 16% following a share issue in November 2009. This action compelled Mr. Ludlow to abandon his legal challenge and led to investors writing off £200,000 due to the company's collapse. Within months, Ms. Killen relaunched the company as H&C TV, which secured a global rights deal for highlights from the Badminton trials, thereby ending a 50-year exclusive coverage arrangement with the BBC.

== Citations ==
https://www.horseandhound.co.uk/features/how-to-watch-bramham-horse-trials-790075

https://useventing.com/news-media/news/eventing-on-demand-usea-and-h-c-bring-members-closer-to-the-action

https://www.horseandhound.co.uk/features/how-to-watch-london-international-horse-show-live-771691

https://www.britishshowjumping.co.uk/news/horse-and-country-to-launch-new-free-streaming-channel

https://www.advanced-television.com/2020/02/19/ruibal-joins-hc-tv-board/

https://www.advanced-television.com/2020/11/23/hc-launches-in-australia-on-samsung-tv-plus/

https://www.broadcastnow.co.uk/martin-clunes-fronts-handc-doc/5116189.article

https://eventingnation.com/new-horse-country-series-now-streaming-postcards-from-paris-on-the-story-of-the-british-success-in-paris/

https://eventingnation.com/horse-country-announces-extensive-new-partnership-with-cornbury-house-horse-trials/

https://eventingnation.com/horse-country-partners-with-usea-to-broadcast-extensive-free-live-coverage-of-2024-american-eventing-championships/
