= Totley Brook =

Stream in South Yorkshire, England

Coordinates: 53.312°N 1.528°W

The Totley Brook is a stream in Sheffield, South Yorkshire, England. It rises on a millstone grit ridge some 7 miles (11 km) to the south-west of the centre of Sheffield. Over its course it drops from 740 feet (230 m) to 430 feet (130 m) near its junction with the Old Hay Brook close to Baslow Road. The streams form the River Sheaf once they have joined.

There is an estate in Dore called Totley Brook, despite the fact that it is actually situated on the Old Hay Brook.

The Totley Brook runs around the south of Totley through Gillfield Woods, flows underneath Mickley Lane, behind the Totley Rise shops and meets Old Hay behind Milldale where Totley Chemical Works once stood. The Works was run by Tinker and Siddall from 1846, and had been taken over by Thomas Kilner by 1899, who manufactured pyroligneous acid, naptha and charcoal.

In September 2014 Sheffield City Council announced plans to create a flood alleviation programme on the Totley Brook. It would consist of an embankment to create a temporary flood storage upstream of Totley. It is estimated that the facility would reduce the depth of water downstream in the River Sheaf by 10 inches (0.26 m) during periods of heavy rainfall.
