= Estuary TV =

Local TV station in Lincolnshire, England

- Country: United Kingdom
- Broadcast area: North & North East Lincolnshire
- Headquarters: Grimsby Institute, Nuns Corner, Grimsby, North East Lincolnshire

Programming
- Picture format: 576i (16:9 SDTV)

Ownership
- Owner: Channel 7 Television (Immage 2000 Studios) (1998–2001); Estuary TV CIC Ltd (Grimsby Institute Group) (2001–2018)
- Sister channels: Yorkshire Coast TV

History
- Launched: 20 January 1998
- Closed: 31 August 2018
- Replaced by: That’s Humber
- Former names: Channel 7 (1998–2013)

Links
- Website: www.estuary.tv

Availability

Terrestrial
- Freeview: Channel 7

Estuary TV was a local television station based in the United Kingdom.

== Coverage ==
Estuary TV was the UK's longest running local television station at the time of its closure. It reached approximately 140,000 homes in North and North East Lincolnshire on Virgin Media's digital television network.

Estuary TV was licensed with Ofcom.

== History ==
Channel 7 was originally set up in Immingham's Immage 2000 Studios in 1996 by Mark Fenty, John Trevitt and Ian Hargreaves with other Directors coming and going for the local community to showcase their talent and for information about local area and its events. The studios were officially opened in 1997 by Lord Puttnam.

The channel was purchased by the Grimsby Institute in 2001 and is a wholly owned subsidiary of the further and higher education college.

Channel 7 officially launched in January 1998 and is situated at the Grimsby Institute's main campus at Nuns' Corner. Prior to that it was situated at the Immingham Resource Centre, in the south part of Immingham, opposite Eastfield Junior and Infants school. During its time at Immingham, Channel 7 was innovative in its programming utilising talents such as Chris McRae, Stuart Hall, Rob Dabb and many others, new to TV yet excited and motivated they produced hours of television a lot of it totally live with interaction with the public. It became a must watch channel for local people with NTL. Driven by John Trevitt his enthusiasm and efforts made it something of which to be proud. Local people learned how to present and, as time went on, others joined the studio as receptionists, later to become presenters and news readers. Every one at Immage 2000 was encouraged to get involved from the receptionist to the sound engineer to the cleaner.

In their advertising breaks, like most local TV stations, their breaks consisted of PIFs from COI alongside local bona fide adverts for Grimsby's independent businesses such as GIFHE.

In 2006, Channel 7 was moved on NTL (now Virgin Media) channel 107 to 879 as part of a channel reshuffle and broadcasts from the Great Coates head-end in the Grimsby region.

On 12 September 2012, Ofcom announced that Channel 7 had been awarded the licence to operate a local TV channel for the Grimsby area. The channel rebranded as Estuary TV and began broadcasting on Freeview from the Belmont transmitting station on 26 November 2013. It was originally proposed that the channel would be renamed Lincolnshire Living.

On 31 October 2013, Estuary TV was awarded a local television licence for Scarborough with Yorkshire Coast TV, expected to launch in 2014.

The evening news team consisted of:

News Team

- Hugh Riches (Lead Presenter)

- Luke Adams (Producer & Presenter)

- Jack Muscutt (Sports Presenter & News Reporter)

- Fred McNamara (News Reporter)

Production Team

- Tom Reid (Senior Producer)

- Neil Crofts (Producer)

- Samantha Bayram (Technical Operator)

Senior Management

- Lia Nici (Executive Producer)

On 2 August 2018, The Grimsby Institute announced that Estuary TV would cease broadcasting on 31 August resulting in the staff losing their jobs. The Institute also announced their intention to work with a larger broadcaster to keep Local TV running in the region after the channel closes.

== Logo ==
Channel 7 logo used until 2009.

Channel 7 logo from 2009 until 2013.

== References and notes ==
Notes
