= Levett =

Family name

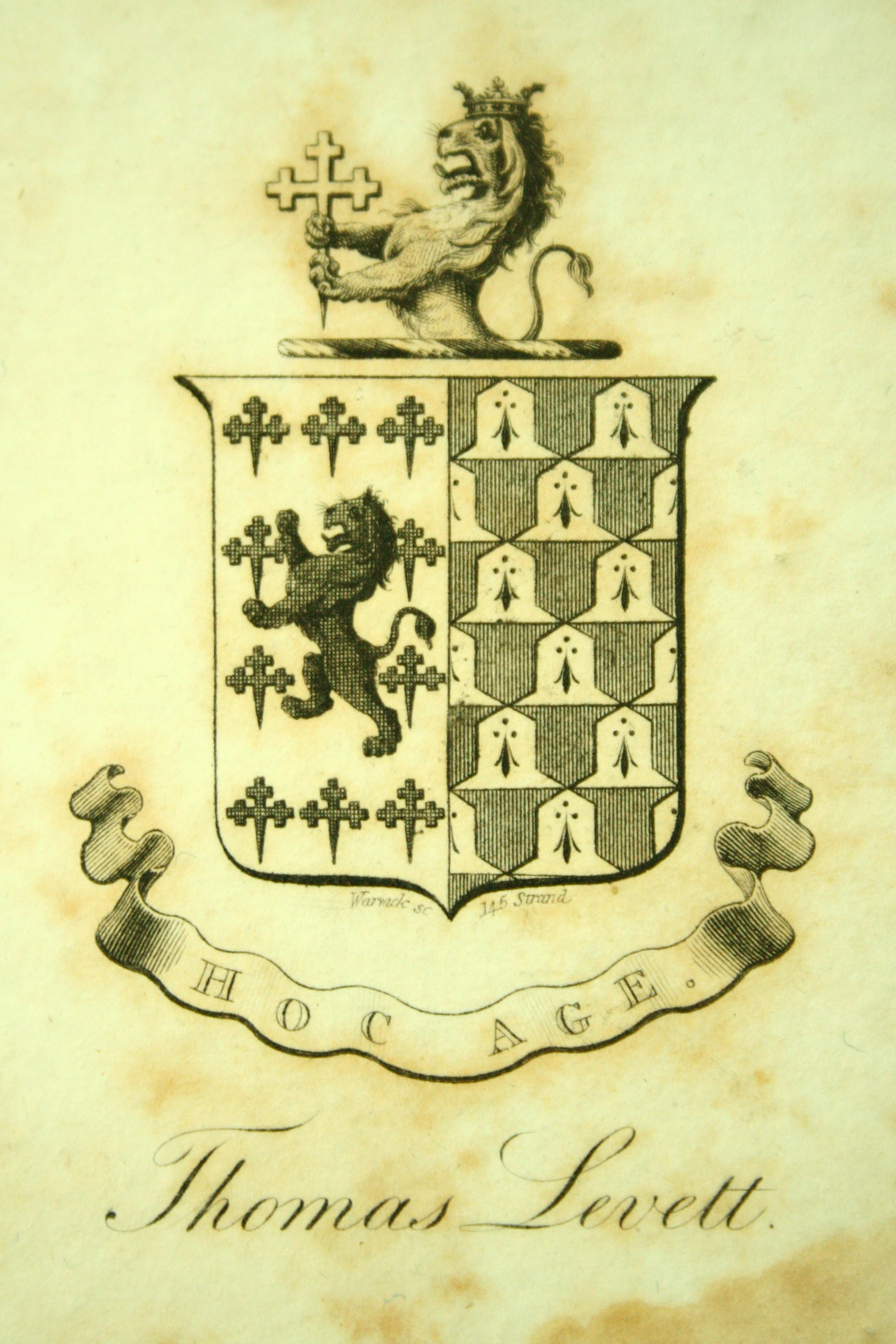
Bookplate of the Rev. Thomas Levett, Arms of Levett impaling Gresley, Packington Hall, Staffordshire

Levett is a surname of Anglo-Norman origin, deriving from [de] Livet, which is held particularly by families and individuals resident in England and British Commonwealth territories.

== Origins ==
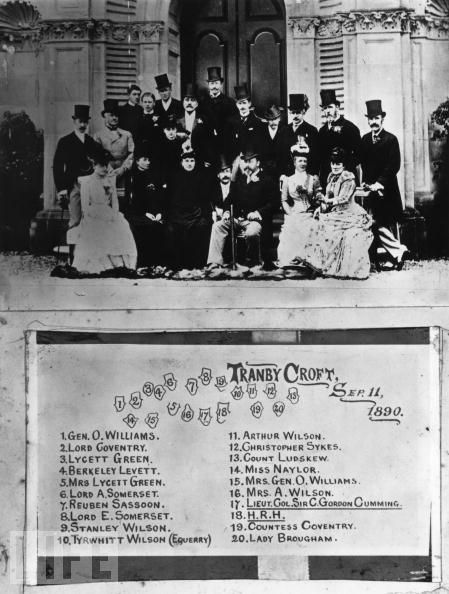
Assembled partygoers at Tranby Croft, 11 September 1890. The Royal baccarat scandal. Pictured are Capt. Berkeley Levett and Edward, Prince of Wales and others.

This surname comes from the village of Livet-en-Ouche, now Jonquerets-de-Livet, in Eure, Normandy. Here the de Livets were undertenants of the de Ferrers family, among the most powerful of William the Conqueror's Norman lords. The name Livet (first recorded as Lived in the 11th century), of Gaulish etymology, may mean a "place where yew-trees grow".

The first de Livet in England, Roger, appears in Domesday as a tenant of the Norman magnate Henry de Ferrers. de Livet held land in Leicestershire, and was, along with Ferrers, a benefactor of Tutbury Priory. By about 1270, when the Dering Roll was crafted to display the coats of arms of 324 of England's most powerful lords, the coat of arms of Robert Livet, Knight, was among them. Some Levetts were early knights and Crusaders; many members of both English and French families were Knights Hospitallers, and served as courtiers.

== English Levetts ==
A Levett family settled in Derbyshire was extinct by the early sixteenth century. A family of the name resident in Sussex at Warbleton and Salehurst also held the manor of Firle until it passed from family control in 1440 due to the debts of Thomas Levett, whose bankruptcy also necessitated the loss of Catsfield, East Sussex. Sussex deeds indicate instances of 'Levetts' attached to place names, indicating possession by individuals and families of that name. In 1620, John Levett, of Sedlescombe, Sussex, was forced by financial hardship to sell his half-interest in Bodiam Castle, inherited family land and property across Sussex and Kent, including at Ewhurst, Salehurst, Battle, Sussex and Hawkhurst, Kent, to Sir Thomas Dyke, for £1000; this represented the end of these Levetts as prominent landowners.

Families of the name Levett (also Levet, Lyvet, Levytt, Livett, Delivett, Levete, Leavett, Leavitt, Lovett and others) would subsequently settle in Gloucestershire, Yorkshire, Worcestershire, Suffolk, Warwickshire, Wiltshire, Kent, Bedfordshire and Staffordshire.

By the mid twentieth century, only two prominent Levett families remained; that of Milford Hall, Staffordshire and that formerly of Wychnor Hall, Staffordshire (and Packington Hall). Milford Hall passed in the female line to the Haszard family, and Wychnor Park was sold by the Levetts to Lt-Col W. E. Harrison in 1913, this later becoming a country club.

The Levett-Scrivener family (descending from a daughter of the Milford Hall family) retains the ruin of Sibton Abbey, which they have made available to historical societies and researchers; the Levett-Prinseps (a branch of the Wychnor Park family) were unable to maintain Croxall Hall; it was sold in 1920 and the estate was broken up.

By 1871, although family tradition of a common ancestor of the Milford Hall and Wychnor Park Levett families was mentioned in the latter pedigree, the earliest listed ancestors of each family were, respectively, William Levett of Savernake, Wiltshire, page to King Charles I at the time of his death in 1649, and Theophilus Levett, who died 1746. Even the 1847 edition, produced at a time when Burke's publications were inclusive of vague, unproven 'family traditions' (a practice subsequently widely criticised), makes no mention of any earlier ancestors or Norman origin in either family's pedigree.

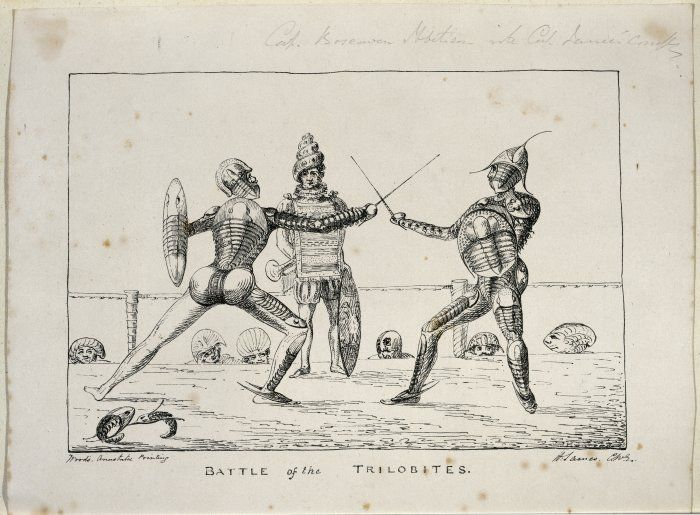
Capt. Levett Landon Boscawen Ibbetson, descendant of merchant Francis Levett, dueling in a trilobite exoskeleton. Drawn by his friend Gideon Mantell, fellow member of The Royal Society

Individuals of the name of Levett (and its variants) appear in all social strata: John Levett, a guard on the London to Brighton coach, was convicted of petty theft and transported to Australia in the nineteenth century; English records reveal Levetts embroiled in bastardy cases or relegated to poorhouses. A Francis Levett was a factor living in Livorno, Italy, travelling back and forth to Constantinople for the Levant Company. He subsequently failed at British East Florida as a planter; his son Francis Jr. returned to America, where he became the first to grow Sea Island cotton.

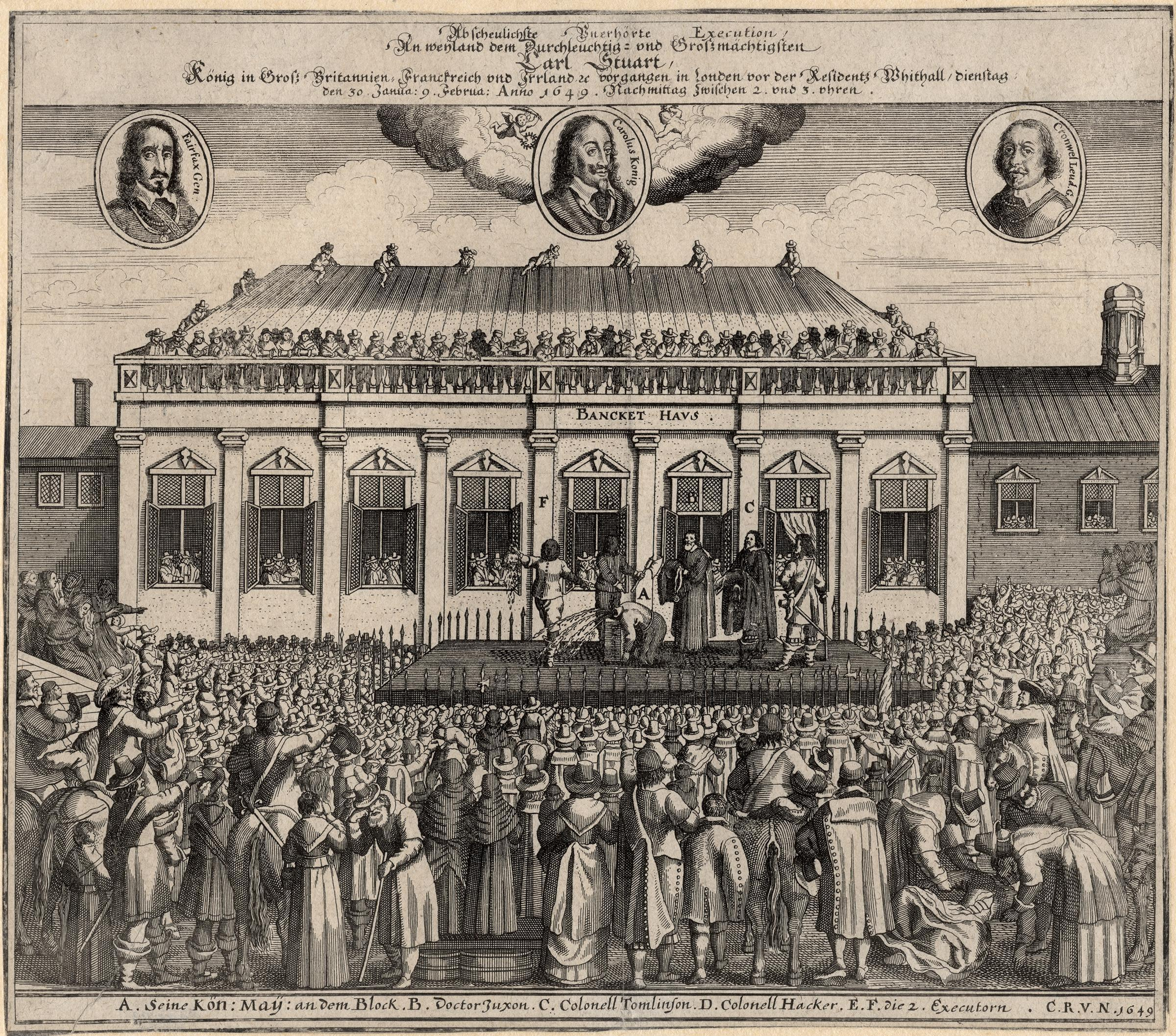
The execution of King Charles I of England, to which he was accompanied on the scaffold by courtier William Levett, Esq.

A notable individual of the name was the unschooled Yorkshireman who, having worked as a Parisian waiter, then trained as an apothecary. Robert Levet returned to England, where he treated denizens of London's seedier neighbourhoods. Having married an apparent grifter and prostitute, Levet was taken in by the poet Samuel Johnson. While Samuel Johnson adopted one Levet as boarder, he was apologizing to another better-placed Levett who held the mortgage on Johnson's mother's home in Lichfield.

== Levetts elsewhere ==
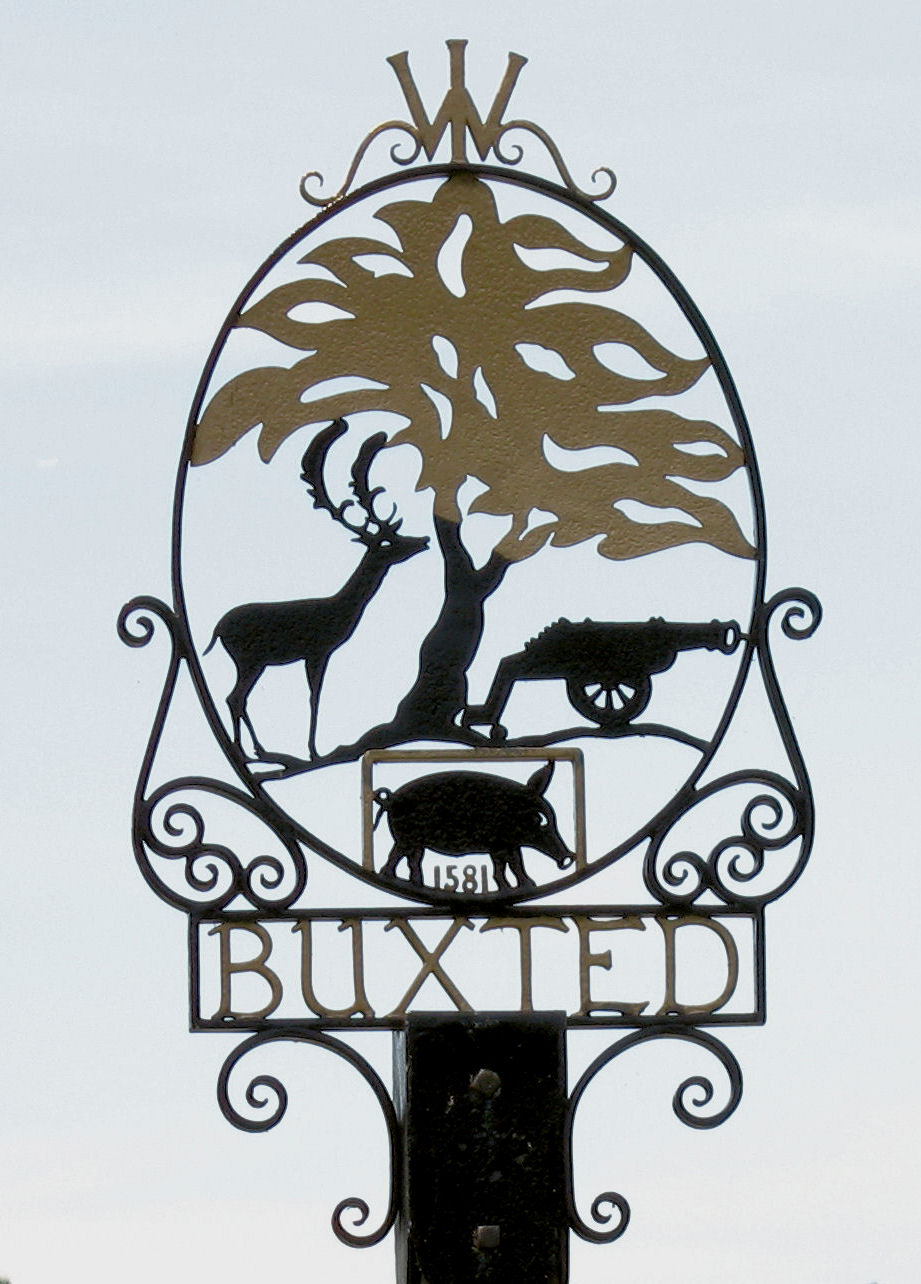
Sign for Buxted, Sussex, commemorating first iron cannon cast in the Weald by iron foundry of Parson William Levett

Today there are many Levetts (the spelling of the name varies) living outside England, including in South Africa, Australia, Singapore, New Zealand, Canada, and Ireland.

In a few cases Levetts were forced by religious belief to flee England for the colonies. Among these were tailor John Leavitt and farmer Thomas Leavitt, early English Puritan immigrants to Massachusetts and New Hampshire, respectively, whose names first appear in seventeenth-century New England records as Levet or Levett.

== People surnamed Levett ==
Individuals bearing the surname of Levett include:

- Ada Elizabeth (A.E.) Levett, born Bodiam, East Sussex, renowned medieval historian, vice principal, St Hilda's College, Oxford, professor at Westfield College, University of London, d. 1932
- Capt. Berkeley John Talbot Levett, London, Saint-Jean-Cap-Ferrat, Scots Guard, Gentleman Usher to the royal family, married brewery heiress Sibell Bass, witness in the infamous Royal baccarat scandal involving the Prince of Wales
- Capt. Christopher Levett, English explorer of New England, first owner of Portland, Maine, born at York, England, 1586
- Egerton Bagot Byrd Levett-Scrivener, Flag Lieutenant, Royal Navy, Bursar, Keble College, Oxford, son of Col. Richard Byrd Levett of Milford Hall, took additional name of Scrivener on inheritance, married daughter of British diplomat Sir Harry Smith Parkes, lived at Sibton Manor, Yoxford, Suffolk
- Francis Levett, English tobacco merchant who married the sister of Sir John Holt, the Lord Chief Justice of England, partner in Sir Richard Levett & Co. with his brother Richard; son Richard a barrister and Alderman of London; ancestor of British geologist and inventor Levett Landon Boscawen Ibbetson, a pioneer of photography
- Francis Levett, British planter in East Florida, built an early Florida plantation, which the family was forced to abandon; his son returned to Georgia to become the first to plant Sea Island cotton (Gossypium barbadense) in America
- Sir Gilbert de Lyvet, Knight, Lord Mayor of Dublin, Ireland, 1233–34, 1235–37, witness to 1210 gift by Isabel de Clare, 4th Countess of Pembroke to the Cathedral of the Holy Trinity, Dublin, in honour of her father Richard de Clare, 2nd Earl of Pembroke, whose tomb is in the Cathedral
- Gordon Levett (1921–2000), pilot, Royal Air Force, World War II, member of Squadron 101, First Fighter Squadron in the Israeli Air Force, only English Gentile pilot in Israeli Air Force, lieutenant colonel, Israeli Air Force, 1948
- Dr. Henry Levett, Old Carthusian, eminent physician at London Charterhouse who wrote a pioneering tract on smallpox, 1710
- John Leavitt, English Puritan, tailor, founding deacon, Old Ship Church, Hingham, Massachusetts, 1681
- John Levett, naturalist, author of The Ordering of Bees: Or, the True History of Managing Them, London, 1634
- John Levett, Tory Member of Parliament, Staffordshire, 1761–62, friend of Erasmus Darwin, Matthew Boulton and others, sometime member of the Lunar Society
- John Levett, athlete, born Battersea, twice champion runner of England, ran 10 miles (16 km) in 52:35, 1852
- Percival Levett, merchant, Chamberlain and Sheriff of the city of York, 1597
- Rev. Ralph Levett, Christ's College, Cambridge, domestic chaplain to Sir William Wray; rector, Grainsby, Lincolnshire, Puritan sympathizer, protégé of Rev. John Cotton, brother-in-law of Rev. John Wheelwright, b. 1600
- Sir Richard Levett, Lord Mayor of London (1699), owner of Kew Palace, adventurer member, London East India Company, Governor, Bank of England (1698), proprietor, Sir Richard Levett & Co., brother of Rev. Dr. William Levett, Dean of Bristol
- Robert Levet, native of Hull, Yorkshire, impoverished apothecary who lived with Samuel Johnson, author of a famous poem eulogizing Levet
- Robin Levett (1925–2008), Australian author and horse breeder, "First Lady of Australian Racing", wife of businessman Geoffrey Levett
- Sidney Kilner Levett-Yeats, born to once-important British colonial family, descendant of East Florida planter Francis Levett, low-level bureaucrat in the India Office civil service, friend to Rudyard Kipling, fellow member of Lahore's Punjab Club, became minor Victorian novelist, author of The Honour of Savelli
- Theophilus Levett, Lichfield town clerk 1721–46, early friend and correspondent of Dr. Samuel Johnson
- Theophilus John Levett, Member of Parliament, Staffordshire 1880–85
- Thomas Levett, High Sheriff of Rutland 1639, Judge of the Admiralty for the Northern Counties, antiquarian, Tixover, Rutland
- Rev. Thomas Levett, rector of Whittington, Staffordshire for 40 years, owner of Packington Hall
- Thomas Levett-Prinsep, son of Theophilus Levett of Wychnor Hall, heir to his uncle Thomas Prinsep, Old Etonian, High Sheriff of Derbyshire, resided at Croxall Hall, Derbyshire, took name of Prinsep on inheritance of his uncle's property, Justice of the Peace and landowner
- William Levett, lord of the manor, Hooton Levitt, South Yorkshire, inherited patronage of Roche Abbey on marriage (ca. 1220) to Constantia, granddaughter of Richard FitzTurgis, co-founder of Roche with Richard de Busli
- Rev. William Levett, rector of Buxted, East Sussex, established the iron foundry industry in Sussex, d. 1554
- Rev. Dr. William Levett, principal, Magdalen College, Oxford, later Dean of Bristol, d. 1694
- William Levett, Esq., longtime courtier to King Charles I of England who accompanied the King to his execution and became embroiled in controversy over whether the King had penned the Eikon Basilike, father of Dr. Henry Levett
- William Howard Vincent "Hopper" Levett, Goudhurst, Kent, Kent and England cricketer
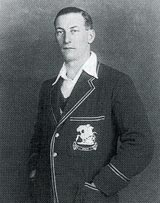
William Howard Vincent 'Hopper' Levett, English cricketer, born Goudhurst, Kent, 25 January 1928

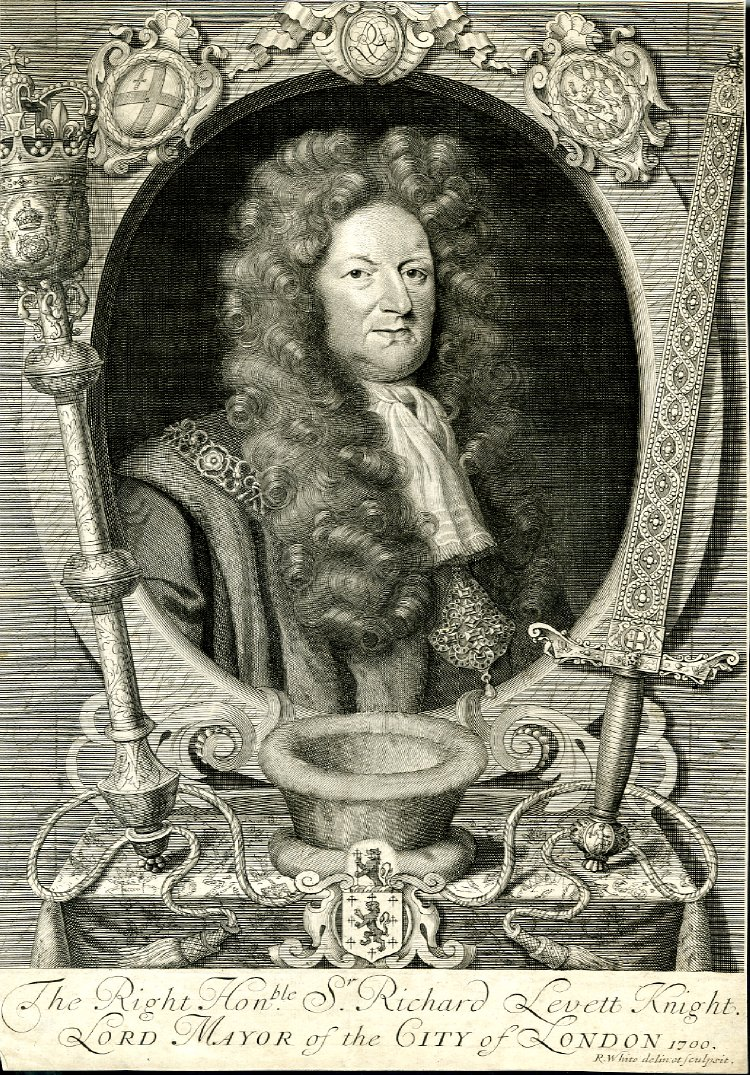
Sir Richard Levett, Lord Mayor of London, 1699–1700

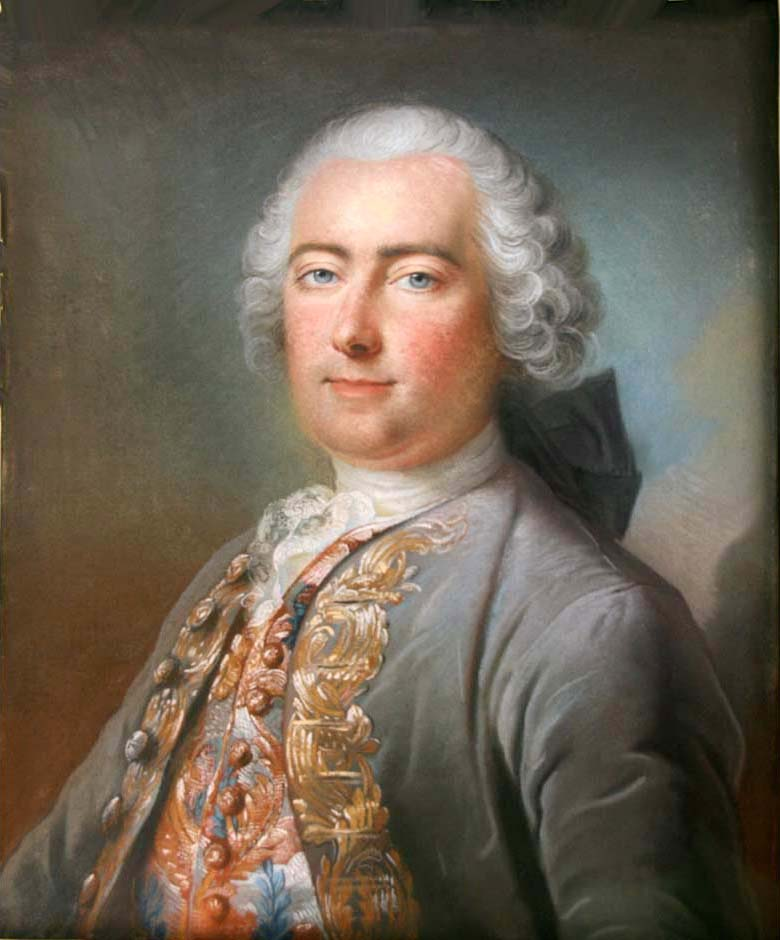
Louis-François de Livet, chevalier, Marquis de Barville during French Revolution, when nobility were stripped of their privileges.

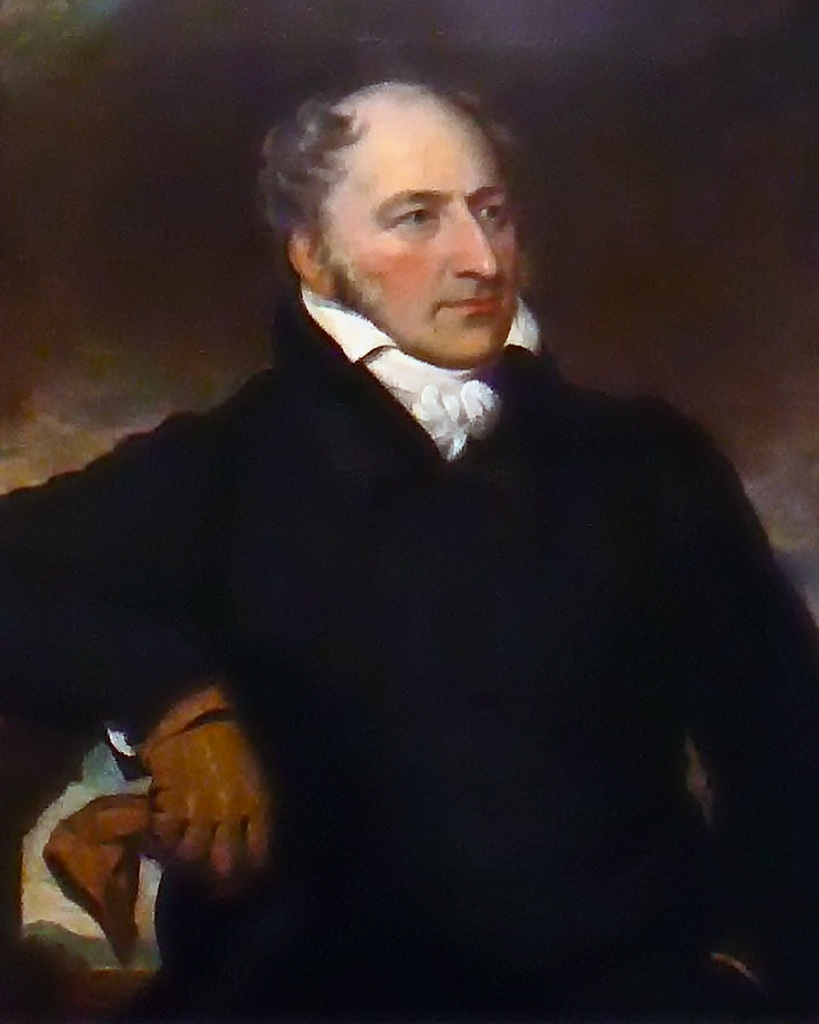
Dr. Robert Levett, Lichfield, Staffordshire. Collection of Erasmus Darwin House, Lichfield

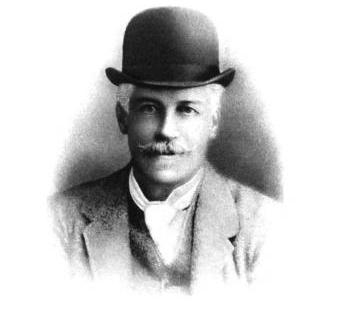
Col. Theophilus John Levett, Member of Parliament, Lichfield, 1880–85

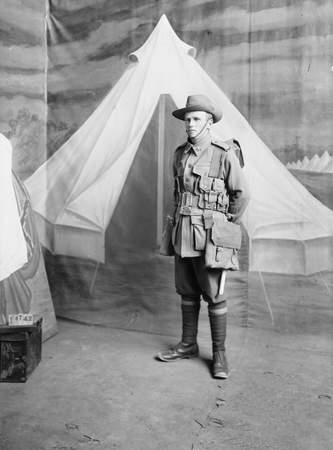
Australian soldier J W Levett, Broadmeadows Army Camp, Melbourne, Australia, 29 March 1916

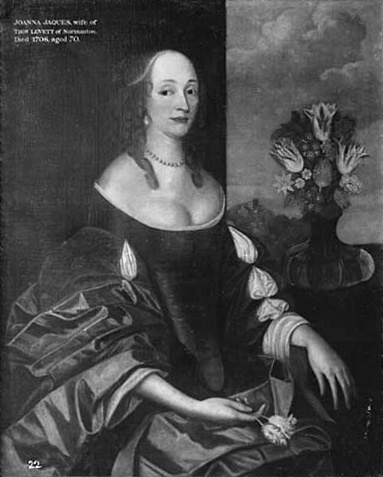
Portrait of Mrs. Thomas Levett of Normanton, West Yorkshire. Collection of Hardwick House, Suffolk

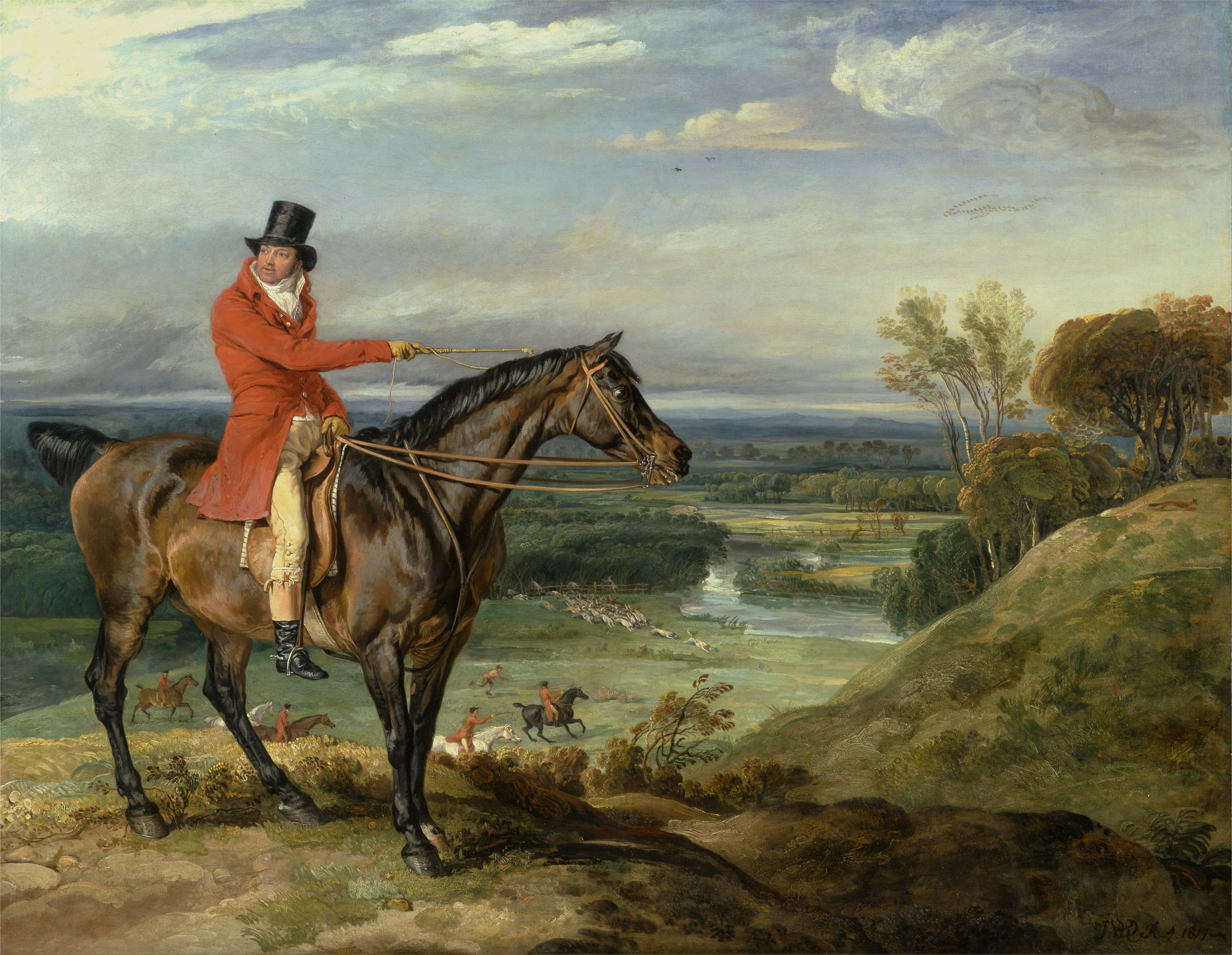
Theophilus Levett Hunting at Wychnor, Staffordshire, 1817, James Ward, R.A. Yale Center for British Art

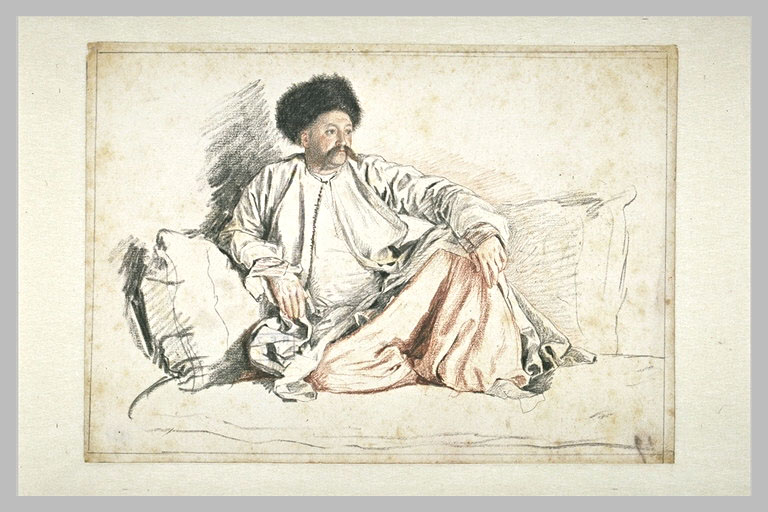
Portrait de M. Levett, Négociant Anglais, en Costume Tartare. Francis Levett, English Turkey merchant, dressed in Turkish costume, circa 1740, drawing by Jean-Étienne Liotard. The Louvre Museum, Paris

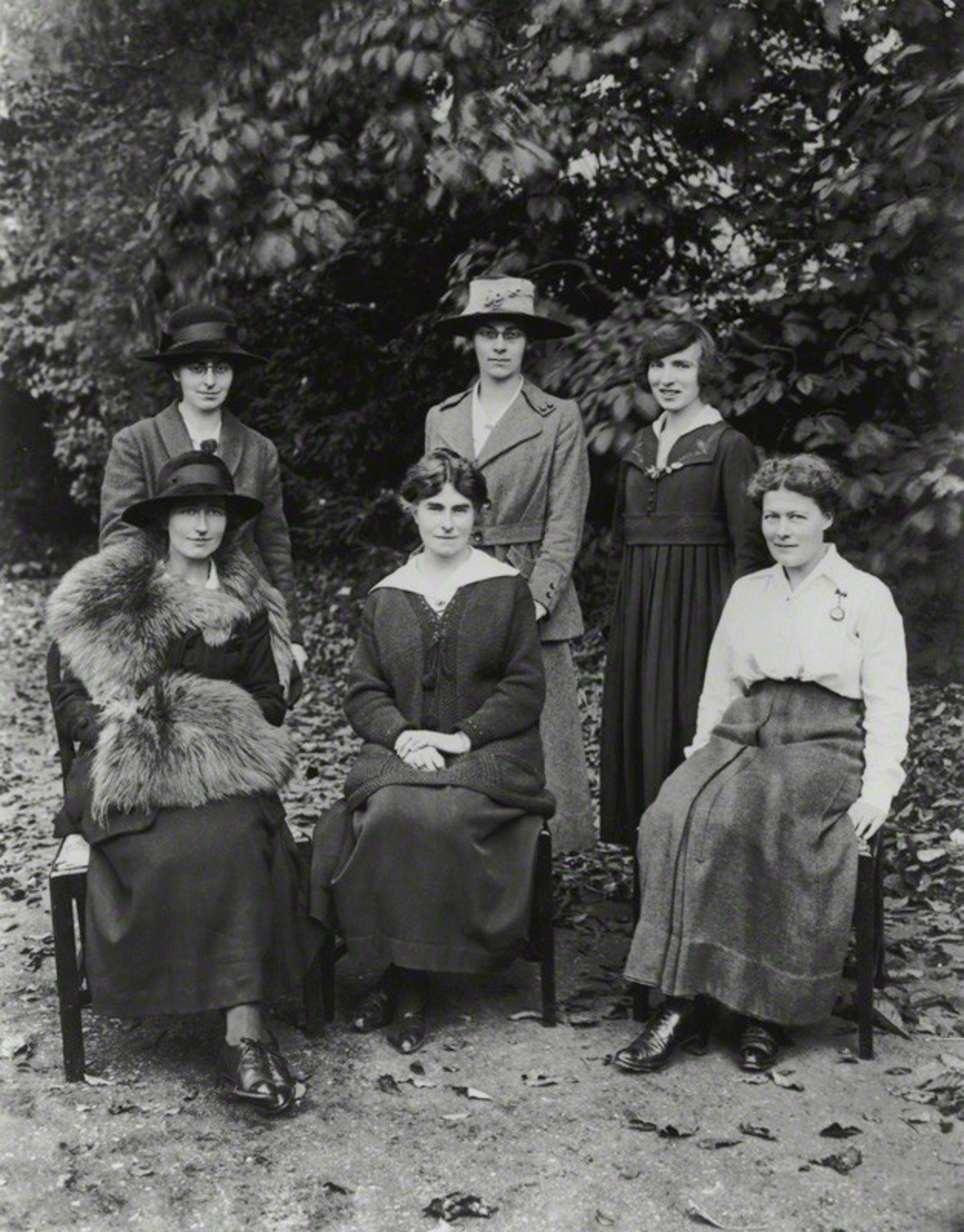
Staff of St Hilda's College, Oxford, including medievalist Elizabeth Levett, October 1919

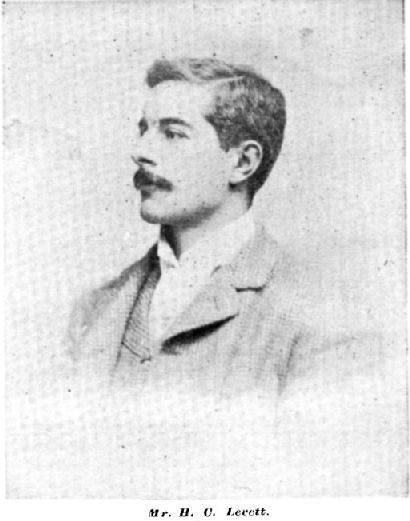
Herbert Cuthbert Levett, born Derbyshire, England. Emigrated to New Zealand 1891 to raise sheep near Beaconsfield

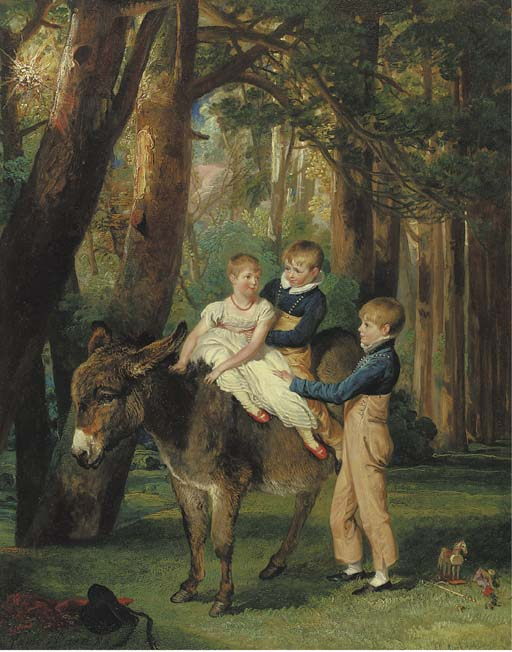
The Levett Children. John, Theophilus and Frances Levett. Portrait by James Ward, R.A., Wychnor, Staffordshire, November 1811

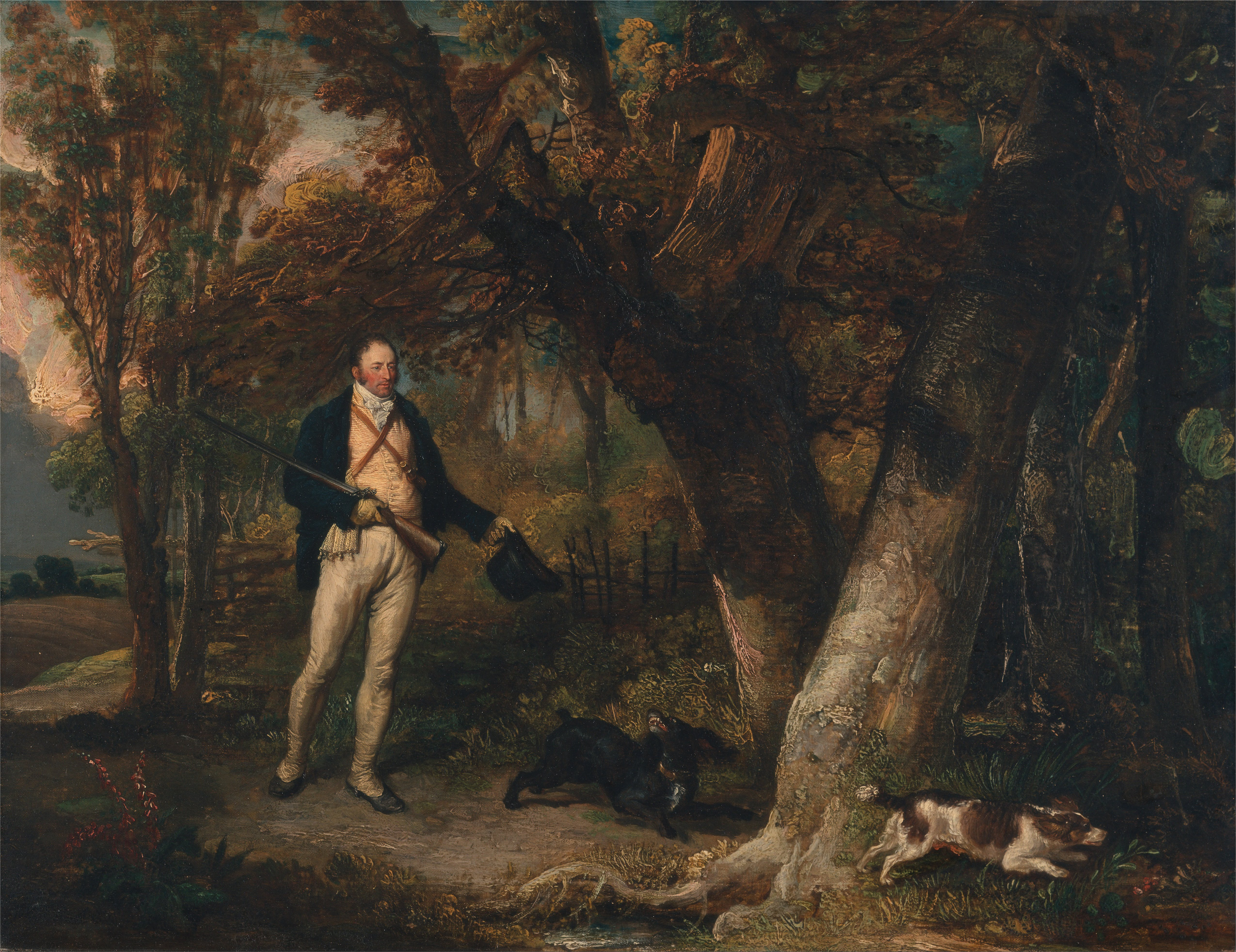
Portrait of the Rev Thomas Levett and Favourite Dogs Cock-Shooting, oil on canvas, James Ward, R.A., 1811. Yale Center for British Art

== Places named after Levett families and individuals ==
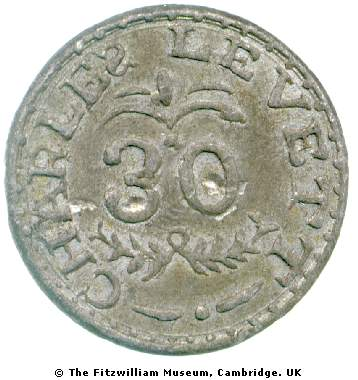
Hops token, 30 bushels, Exden Hop Farm, Newenden, Kent, Charles Levett, 1865

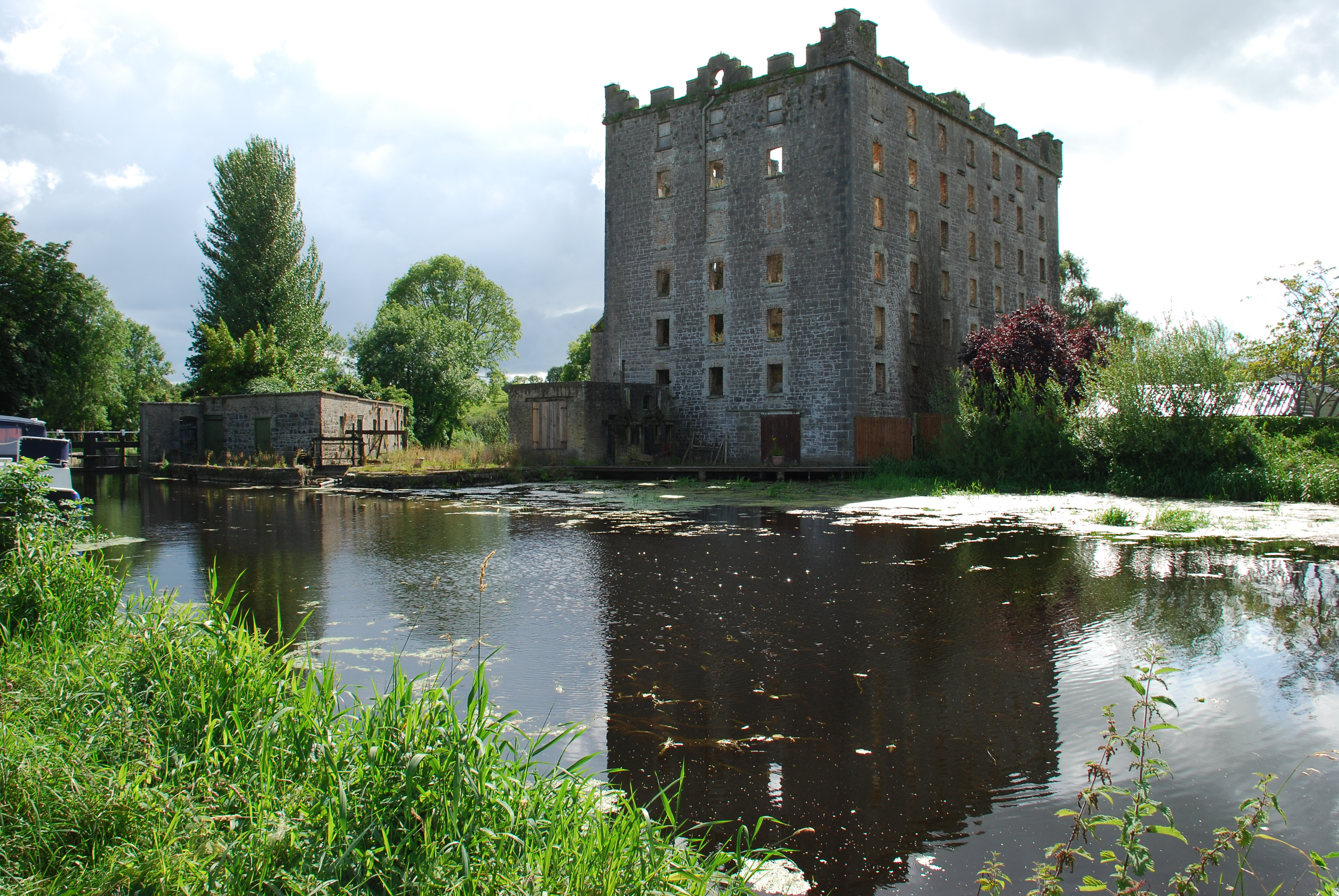
Ruins of Levitstown Mill, County Kildare, Ireland

- Hooton Levitt, South Yorkshire
- Catsfield Levett, East Sussex, now simply Catsfield
- Levitt Hagg, South Yorkshire
- Fort Levett, Casco Bay, Maine
- Levette Lake, British Columbia, Canada
- Levitstown (initially Lyvetiston), County Kildare, Ireland
- Leavitt, California
- Leavittsburg, Ohio
- Leavitt Island, Alaska North Slope
- Leavittstown, now Effingham, New Hampshire
- Leavitt's Hill, now Deerfield, New Hampshire
- Leavitt Peak, California
- Leavitt, Alberta, Canada
- Levetts Fields, Lichfield, Staffordshire
- Levetts Square, Lichfield, Staffordshire
- Leavitt (crater), Moon
- 5383 Leavitt, asteroid, Solar System

== Places associated with Levett families or individuals ==
These places are or were associated with Levett families or individuals:

- Bodiam Castle, Bodiam, East Sussex
- Firle, East Sussex
- Wychnor Park, Staffordshire
- Milford Hall, Staffordshire
- Croxall Hall, Staffordshire
- Kew Palace, Richmond upon Thames
- Walton Hall, Walton-on-Trent, Derbyshire
- Packington Hall, Whittington, Staffordshire
- Hardwick House, Bury St Edmunds, Suffolk
- Breamore House, Hampshire
- Roche Abbey, South Yorkshire
- Sibton Abbey, Yoxford, Suffolk
- Normanton, West Yorkshire
- All Saints Church, Normanton, West Yorkshire
- St Leonards-on-Sea, East Sussex
- Buxted, East Sussex
- Angle, Pembrokeshire, Wales
- Hollington, East Sussex
- Bexhill-on-Sea, East Sussex
- Hillesley and Tresham, Gloucestershire
- Doncaster, South Yorkshire
- Wakefield, West Yorkshire
- Hopwas, Staffordshire
- Pontefract, West Yorkshire
- St James' Church, High Melton, South Yorkshire
- Flintham, Nottinghamshire
- St. Pierre, Monmouthshire, Wales
- Dagenham, East London
- Kew, Surrey
- Salehurst, East Sussex
- Great Longstone, Derbyshire
- Wickersley, South Yorkshire
- Westbourne, West Sussex
- Beckley, Oxfordshire
- Botolphs, West Sussex
- Warbleton, East Sussex
- Little Horsted, East Sussex
- Savernake Forest, Wiltshire
- Swindon, Wiltshire
- Lichfield, Staffordshire
- Hornchurch, London Borough of Havering, East London
- Rochester Cathedral, Rochester, Kent
- Whittington, Staffordshire
- Polegate, East Sussex
- Seaford, East Sussex
- Nova Scotia
- British East Florida
- Portland, Maine
- Cushing Island, Maine
- York County, Maine
Gallery

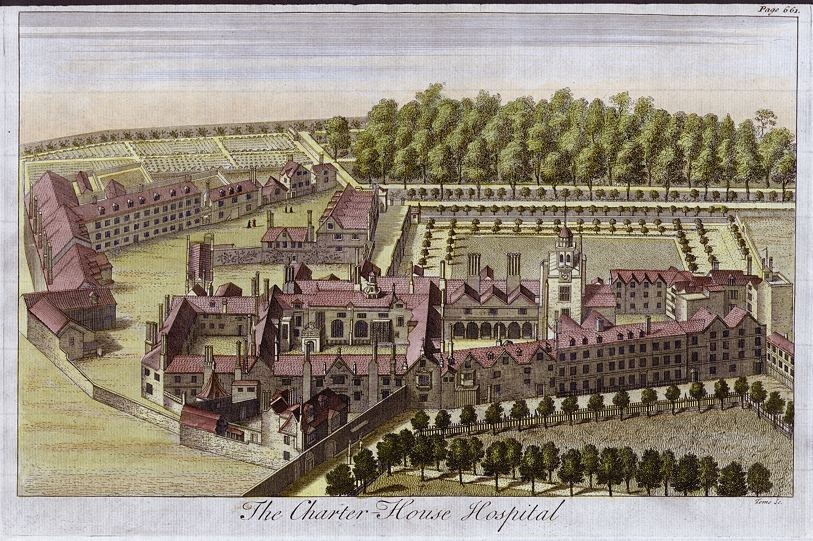
Charterhouse Hospital, London, Dr. Henry Levett, chief physician

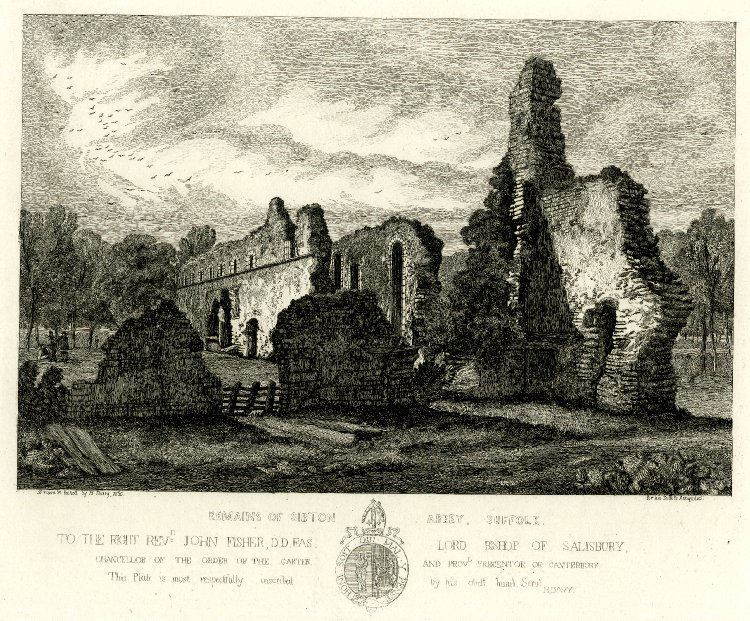
The ruins of Sibton Abbey, 1827, only Cistercian Abbey in East Anglia. Owned by Levett-Scrivener family

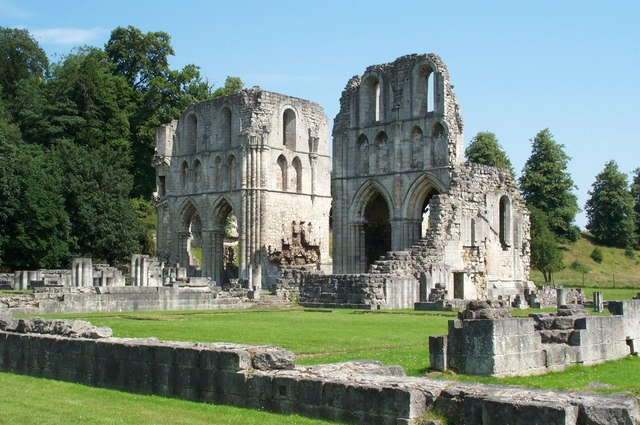
Roche Abbey, South Yorkshire, under patronage of Levetts of Yorkshire

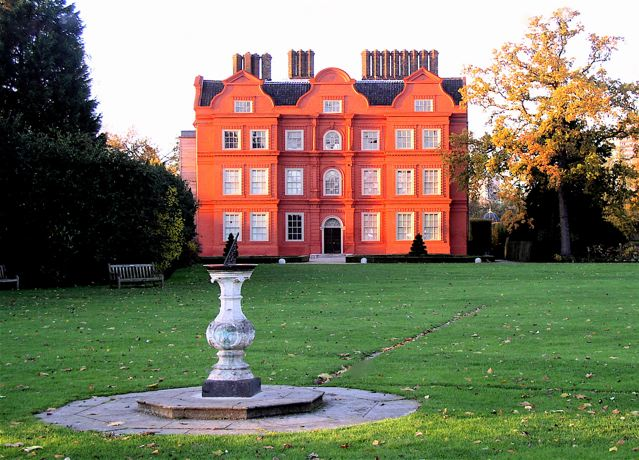
Kew Palace, Kew, Richmond, Surrey, home of Sir Richard Levett

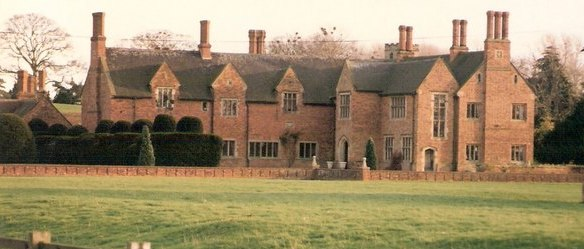
Croxall Hall, home of the Levett-Prinsep family

All Saints Church, Normanton, West Yorkshire, medieval tomb chest of the Malet and Levett families

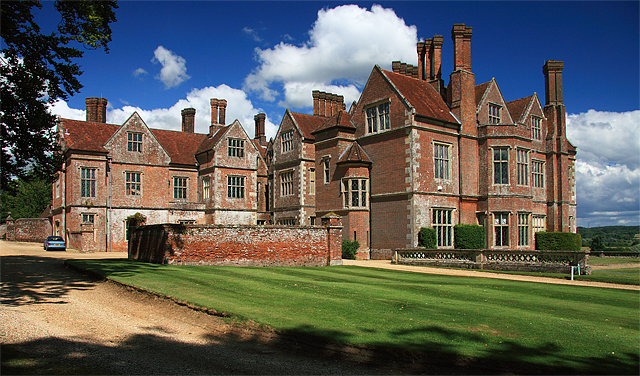
Breamore House, Hampshire, repository for Levett heirlooms

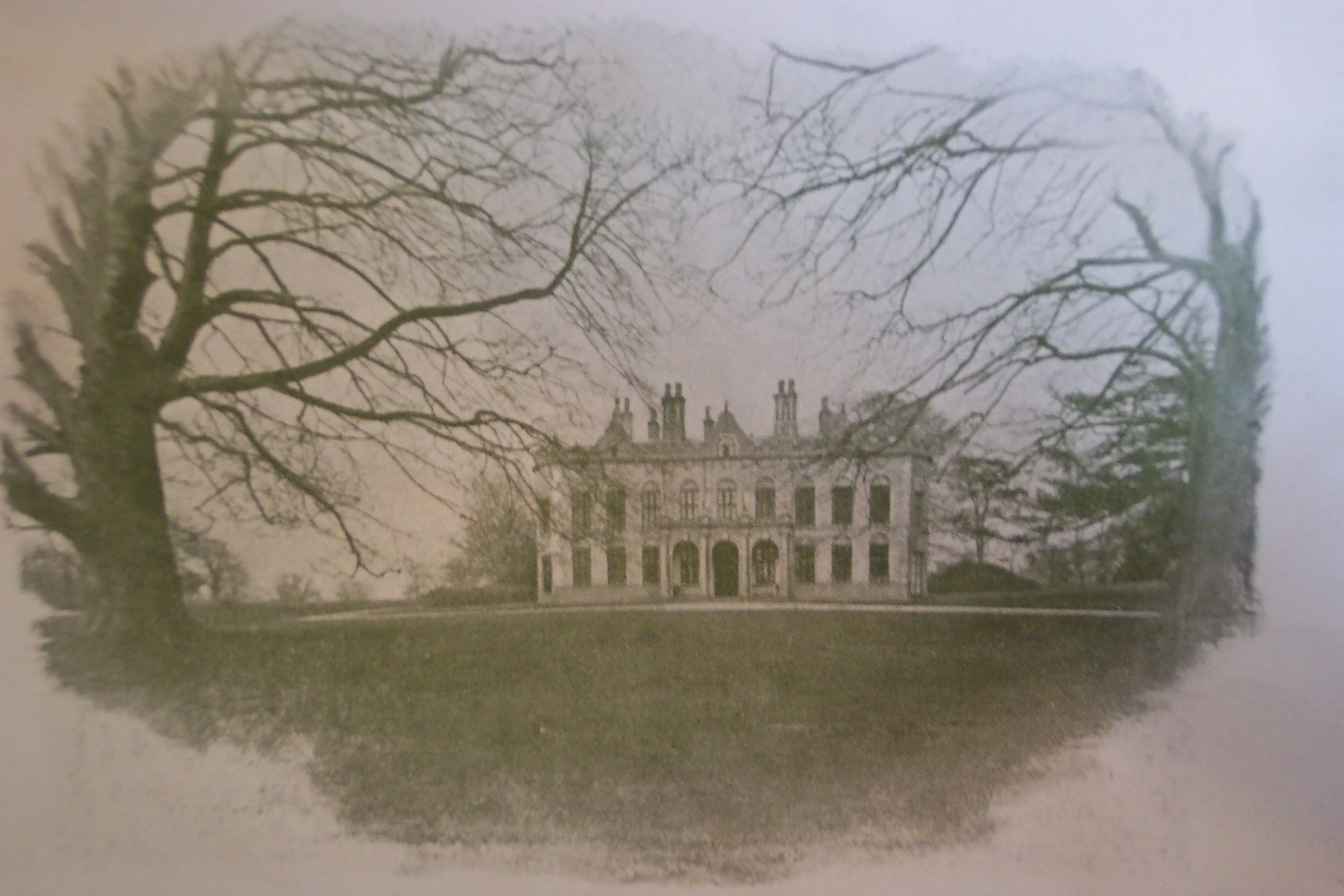
Packington Hall, Whittington, Staffordshire. Longtime home of one branch of Levett family of Staffordshire

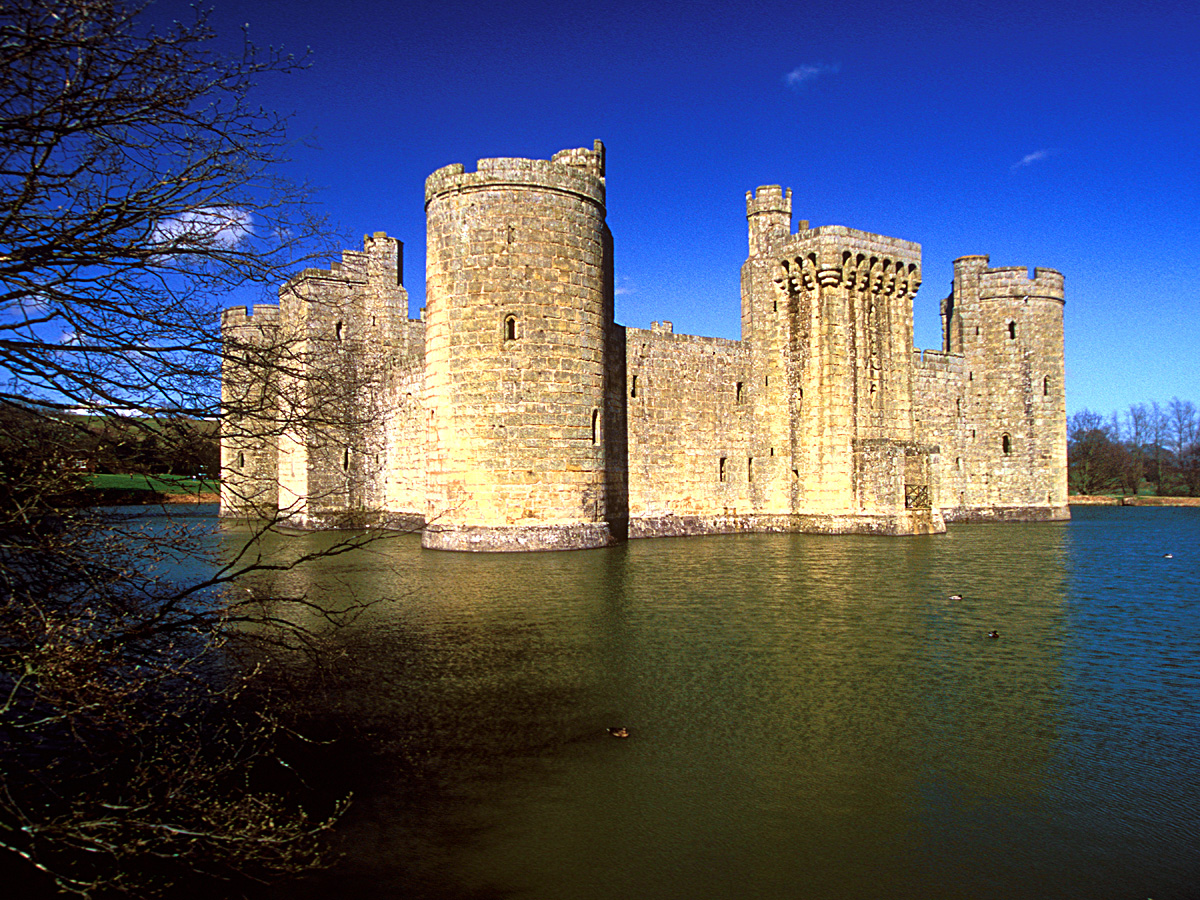
Bodiam Castle, Sussex, purchased by John Levett, 1588

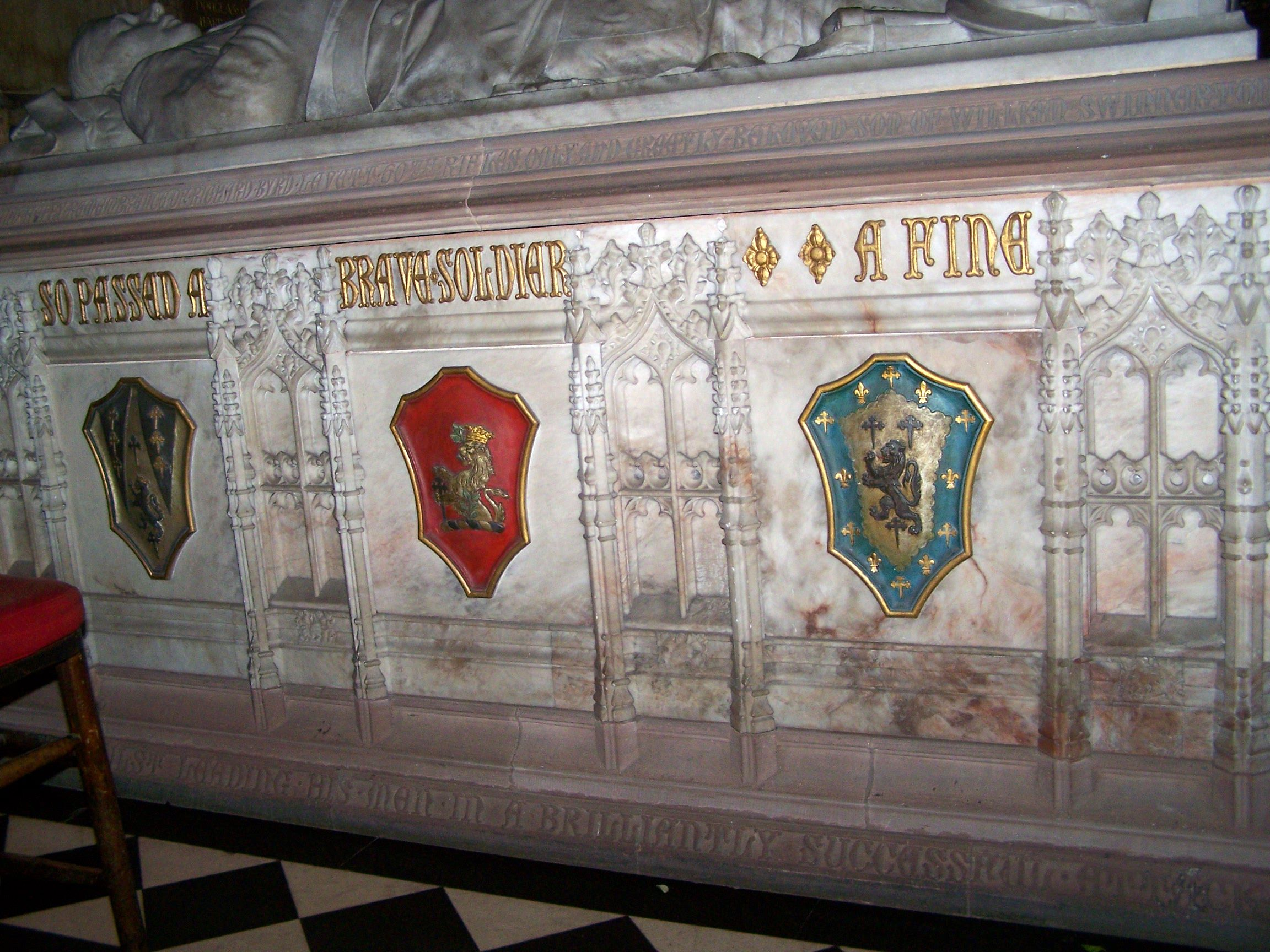
Tomb of Lt Richard Byrd Levett, King's Royal Rifle Corps, Church of St Thomas, Walton-on-the-Hill, Staffordshire

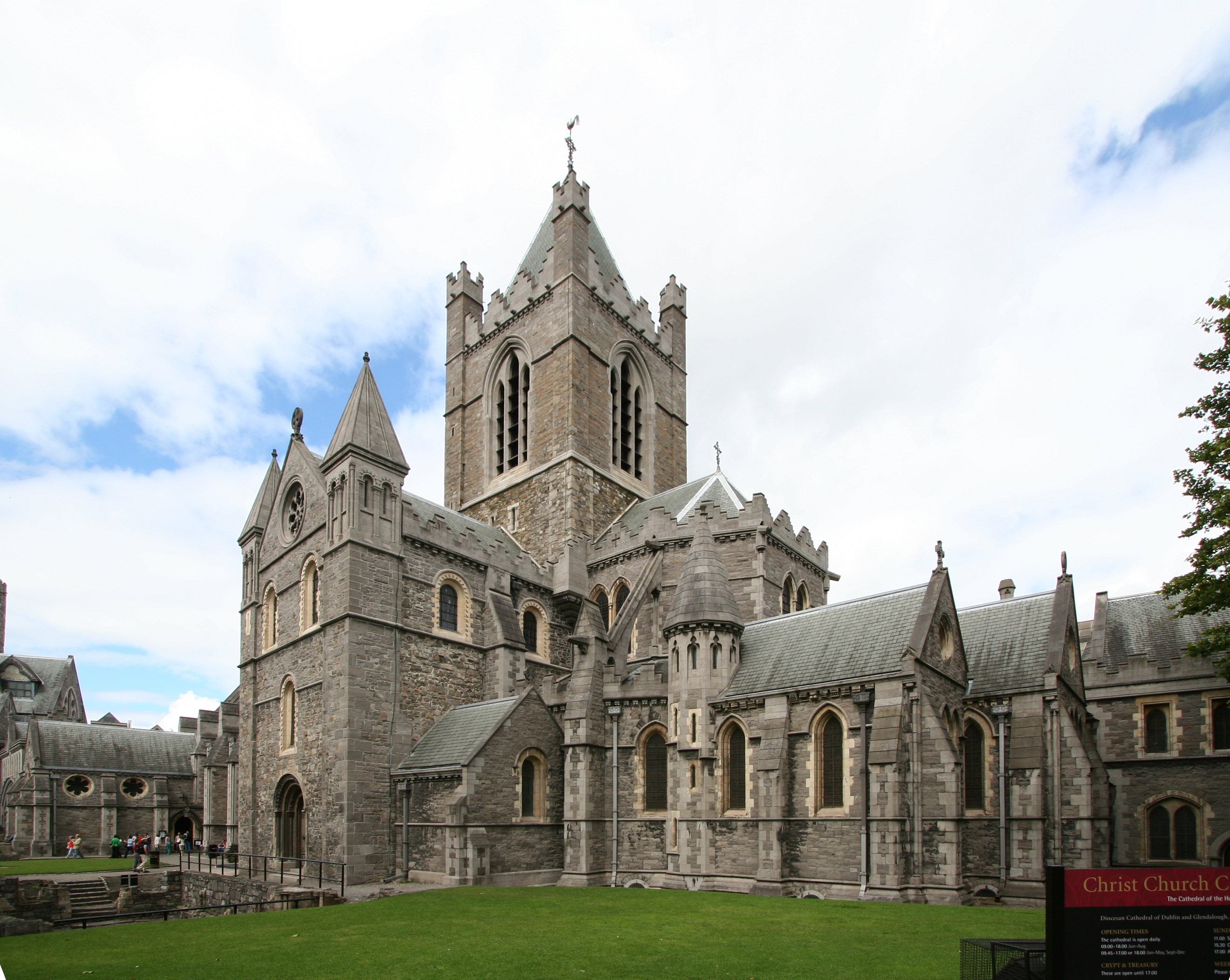
Christ Church Cathedral, Dublin, burial place of Lord Mayor Gilbert de Lyvet

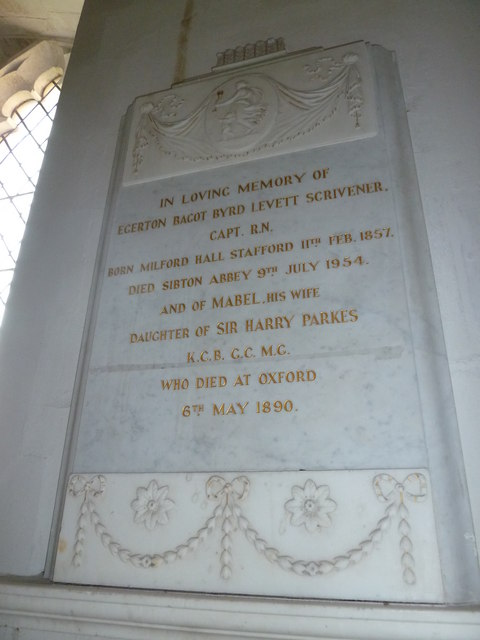
Funerary monument to Capt. Egerton Bagot Byrd Levett-Scrivener, St Paul's Church, Sibton, Suffolk

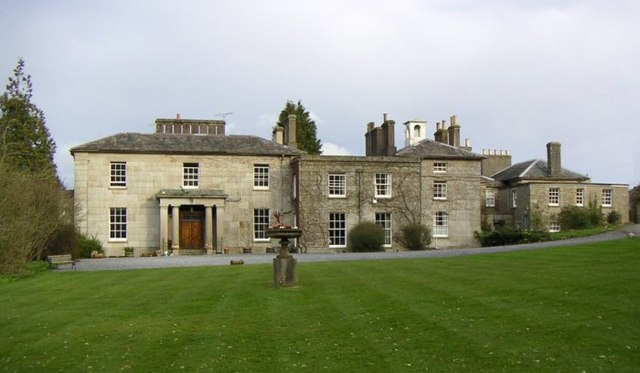
Colehayes Park, Bovey Tracey, Devon, country house, seat of Capt. Theophilus Levett of Wychnor Park

== In media ==
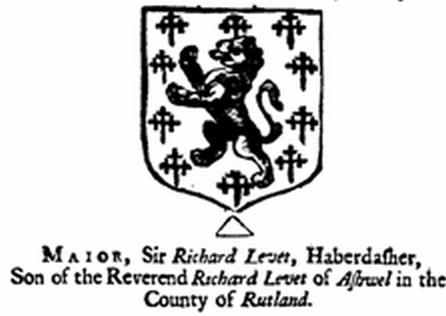
Coat of arms of Lord Mayor of London Sir Richard Levett. Strype's Survey of London, 1720

- Levett was the name given by Alfred Hitchcock to the villain in his first film, The Pleasure Garden, a 1925 silent movie
- Geoffrey Levett is the male lead character in Margery Allingham's novel, The Tiger in the Smoke (made into a 1956 British film of the same name)

== See also ==
- Leavitt (surname)
