= Francis Levett =

English merchant

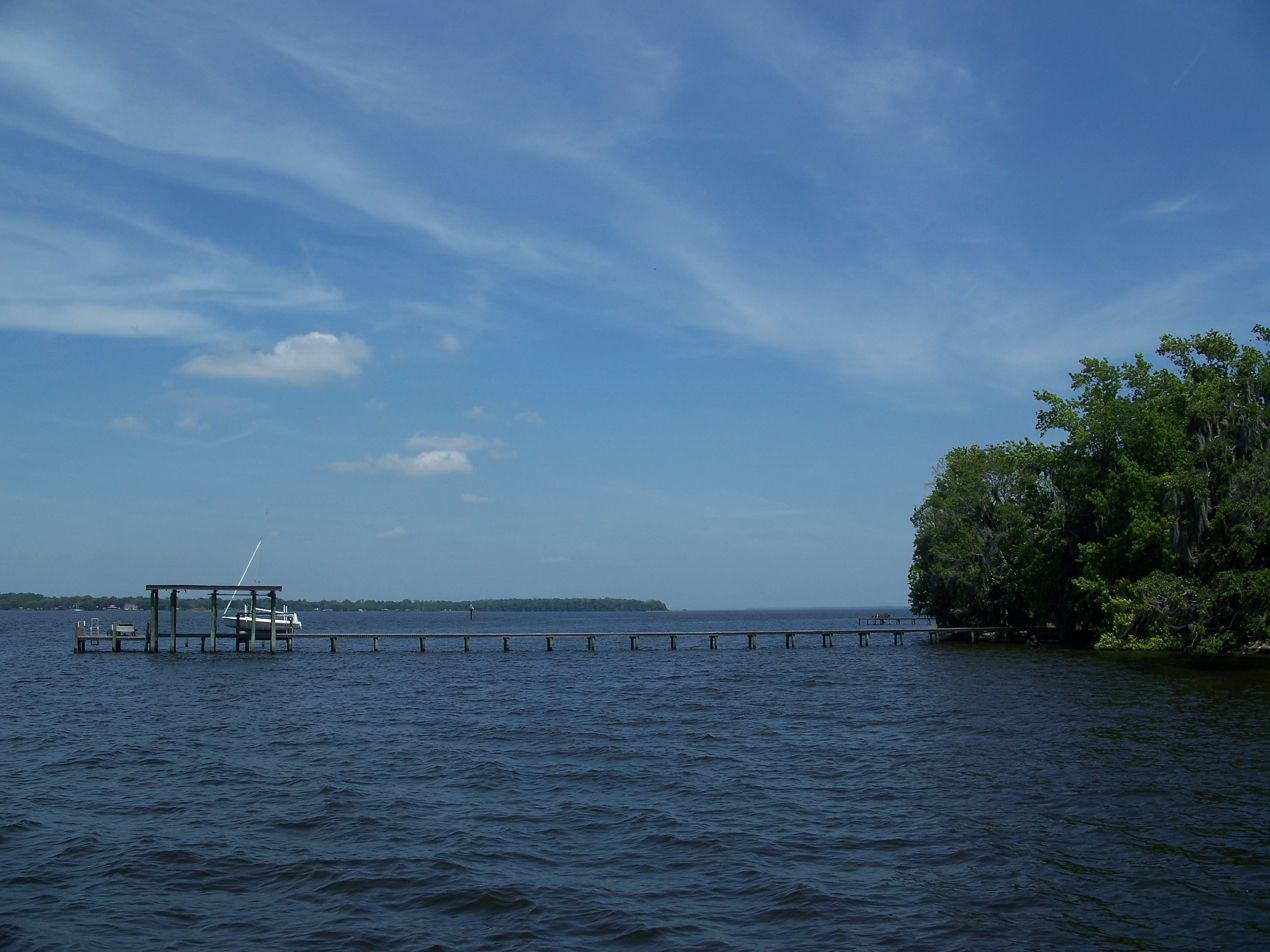
Today's St. Johns River, Florida, site of Francis Levett's Julianton Plantation

Francis Levett was an English merchant who worked as factor at Livorno, Italy, for the Levant Company until he lit out for East Florida in 1769 where his brother-in-law Patrick Tonyn of the British Army had been appointed governor of the English colony. Wielding connections from a lifetime of overseas trading, as well as family connections from a powerful English mercantile family, Levett built one of the first plantations in Florida, and then forfeited his investment when the English lost their foothold in Florida, forcing him to flee to the British colony in the Bahamas. Eventually his son returned to Georgia, where he (or, perhaps more accurately, his slaves) became the first to plant Sea Island cotton in America.

== Early life ==
Born in the Ottoman Empire, the son of Francis Levett, a tobacco merchant who as a descendant of the trading house built by two brothers, Sir Richard Levett, Lord Mayor of London, and his brother Francis Levett, planter Francis Levett was well-connected in the tight world of English trading overseas. Piggybacking on the exploding British Empire, these early English traders built juggernauts, trading everything from tobacco to indigo to textiles. The early Levett brothers, sons of a Puritan rector in Ashwell, Rutland, built their empire from scratch, intermarrying with other powerful merchant families. Francis Levett followed in their footsteps.

Having established his connections with such powerful London merchants as Sir Richard Oswald, Levett gave up his position with the Levant Company and returned to London. But having spent his career abroad, Levett wasn't accustomed to the damp weather in the capitol. Having inherited a fortune from an uncle, Levett decided to move to the British colony in East Florida. Levett planned initially to import Greek labourers from Smyrna into the fledgling British colony to do the work of planting. That scheme was apparently soon abandoned.

In the meantime, Levett exploited all his connections. He was named in 1771 to a position helping oversee the Russian fur trade.

== Move to Florida ==
=== Plantation ===
But his connections still served him well. He secured an appointment as an agent for John Perceval, 2nd Earl of Egmont to manage the Earl's land grants in his absence. Then Levett was tapped as a judge for the new colony and granted large tracts of land at the insistence of Oswald and his brother-in-law Tonyn. Oswald encouraged Governor James Grant to set aside prime acreage for his "worthy friend" Levett, to whom Oswald said he owed "particular obligations." A recipient of the largesse of the initial old boy network, Levett built his 10,000-acre (40 km^{2}) Julianton Plantation on today's St. Johns River.

The complex Levett built showed what could be done in a new colony by a powerful English merchant with money and connections. In addition to indigo fields and acres devoted to corn, potatoes and peas, the new plantation also had a network of rice fields, sliced by dams and dykes to regulate them. But the centrepiece of Levett's edifice was the domestic arrangement, which included a vineyard with 3,000 vines, two hanging gardens fronting the St. Johns River, 50 farm buildings, a network of bridges, roads and causeways built by Levett's slaves, including slave cabins, kitchens, barns, poultry houses and the crowning gem: a large two-story dwelling measuring 60 feet (18 m)-by-36 feet (11 m) with seven rooms on each floor. The home had seven bays, a gambrel roof, which itself supported a lantern tower. On either side of the house were six separate dependency structures, three on either side of the mansion, diminishing in size as they extended outward.

The opulent home, said to be the finest in British East Florida, had a 180-foot wharf for the docking of ships. Stallions, breeding mares, and goats grazed nearby on the rich pastures surrounding the home. It was an extraordinary gesture to import the luxuries of a wealthy Englishman to a fledgling, mosquito-infested colony in the Americas. In addition to his inherited income, Levett relied on fees paid him by absentee English landlords to manage their plantations as well.

=== Hostility towards Levett ===
Despite his connections in the new colony, which included not only his brother-in-law the Governor, but also his son-in-law Dr. David Yeats, a physician and Secretary of the Colony who had married Levett's daughter, Francis Levett apparently got into financial trouble. He was accused in a whisper campaign of embezzling funds by purchasing slaves for one of his absentee clients, Thomas Ashby, and then absorbing them into his plantation workforce. Rev. John Forbes, a Scottish immigrant and ancestor of the Forbes family in America, accused Levett of blatant theft.

In several letters written to Governor Grant, Forbes said Levett had diverted the resources of his absentee landlords. The English planter was "charged with purchasing Negroes on Ashby's account and claiming them as his own, with employing Ashby's Negroes at his (own) work, with carrying boatloads of corn from Ashby's place to his (Julianton) settlement without giving credit for them, and with many such extraordinary and unjust transactions," Forbes wrote.

Thomas Ashley sent a relative to Florida to investigate the charges of malfeasance. Levett was said to be so upset by the allegations that he went to Rhode Island to escape the controversy. In the meantime, his son-in-law Yeats stood bail for him. By 1774, Levett returned to East Florida and subsequently resigned from the Royal Council after discovering that the controversy had rendered him ineffective: no members would sit with him.

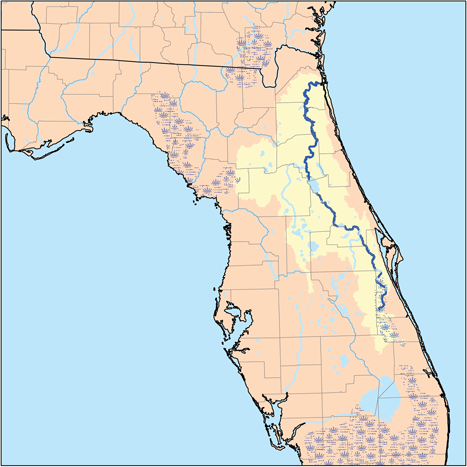
St. Johns River watershed, present-day state of Florida

Within months the planter's brother Patrick Tonyn was named the colony's second Governor, and he presided over a rehabilitation of his brother-in-law. Levett was allowed to make restitution and died shortly afterwards. Management of his Julianton plantation fell to his son Francis Levett Jr., who was apparently a better businessman than his father. The Levett plantation thrived during the Revolutionary War, thanks to the need for Florida turpentine.

At the end of the War, some 13,000 Loyalists fled the new American nation for East Florida, which was still under British control. But their haven didn't last long; in the diplomatic after effects of American independence, the British were forced to cede their Florida colony back to Spain in 1784.

Unwilling to swear loyalty to the Spanish Crown many of the English planters like Francis Levett Jr. were forced to pack up everything and leave hurriedly. Their mood was bleak. "I am totally ruined and see nothing but want and misery before me," wrote Francis Levett's son-in-law Yeats to his good friend James Grant.

== Retreat from Florida and later years ==
Following the signing of the Treaty of Paris in 1783, Francis Levett Jr. was forced to transport all his goods, including 100 slaves and house frames and household silver, to the Bahamas on short notice. Much of Levett's loot was left behind on the docks when Levett's newly purchased schooner was found inadequate to handle the family's accumulated riches.

The family was never able to sell its East Florida properties. The elaborate English manor house and farms were abandoned. Francis Levett's attempts to establish himself as a planter in the Bahamas failed, and the heir was forced to return to London. But he and his wife Charlotte Box had apparently gotten a taste for life in America. They later returned to the state of Georgia, where the English planter, thanks to his father's old friend Henry Laurens, established himself at a new plantation on the Harris Neck peninsula overlooking Sapelo Island in McIntosh County, Georgia. He named the new plantation Julianton, in honour of his father's abandoned Florida plantation and his mother Julia.

Levett Jr. became one of the first planters in America to sow Sea Island cotton, taking advantage of both his knowledge of the crop that he brought with him from İzmir, and of a global shortage of cotton following the Haitian Revolution and the abolition of slavery on that cotton-producing island. The 1790s were boom years for South Carolinian cotton, according to historian Sven Beckert, with exports increasing from 10,000 pounds in 1790 to 6.4 million in 1800. Francis Levett Jr. died in 1802. He left the newly christened Julianton Plantation to his wife.
