= Robin Levett =

Australian writer

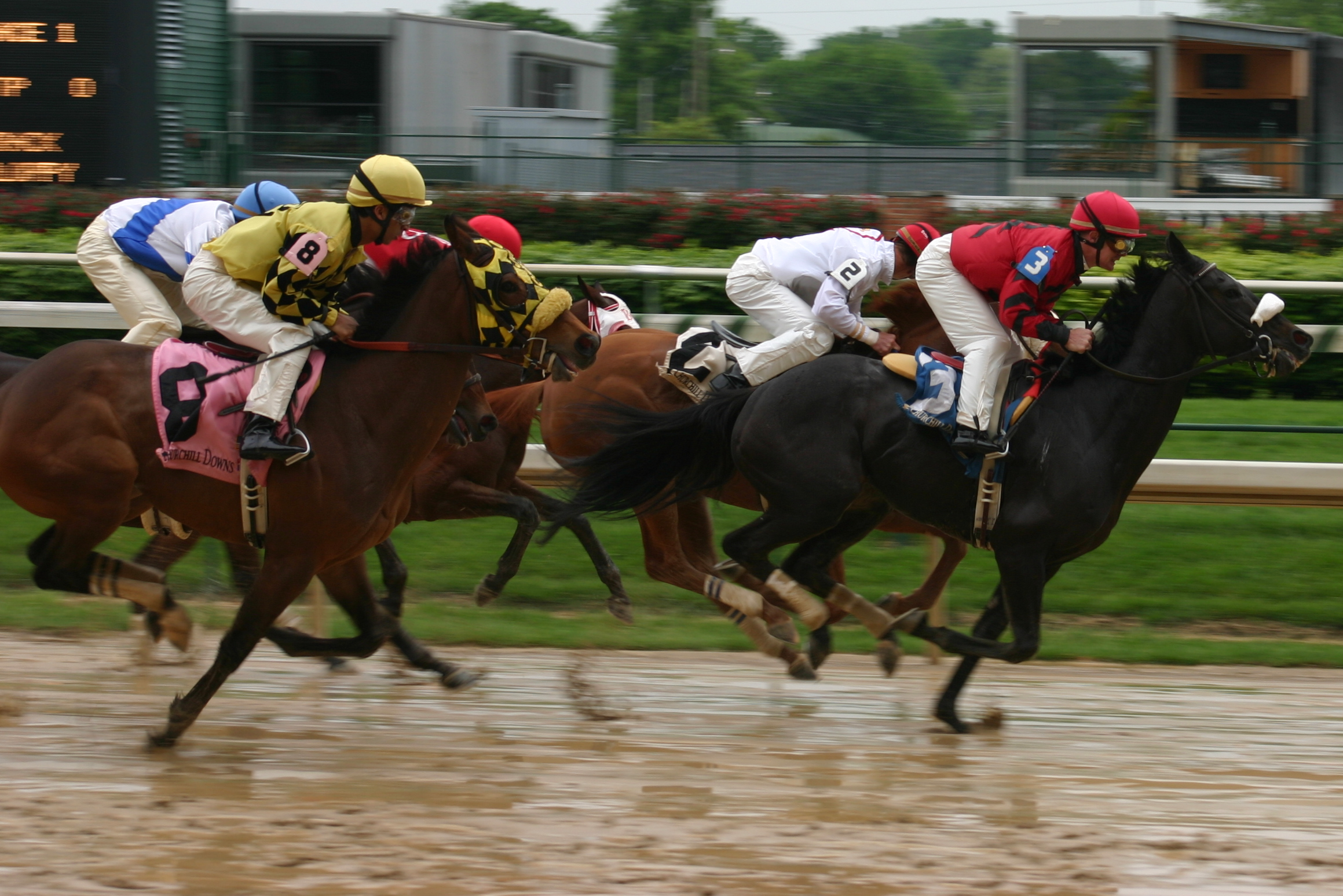
- Born: Robin Walker; October 14, 1925; Sorrento, Victoria, Australia
- Died: August 14, 2008 (aged 82)
- Occupations: Travel writer, novelist, philanthropist, pilot, racehorse breeder
- Known for: "First Lady of Australian Racing"
- Spouses: Geoffrey Levett (m. ?–1990); Nick Hudson (m. ?–2008)

Robin Levett (14 October 1925 – 14 August 2008) was an Australian travel writer, novelist, philanthropist, pilot, and breeder of racehorses, anointed the "First Lady of Australian Racing" in the mid-1990s. Her eclectic interests ranged from fly fishing in Kashmir, about which she wrote a book, to running her own wildlife refuge in Victoria.

== Biography ==
Robin Levett was born Robin Walker, the daughter of Major Geoffrey and his wife Aileen (Whiting) Walker in Sorrento, Victoria. As a girl, she attended the prestigious Hermitage School, from which she was expelled after she tried to burn it down. She later attended Toorak College in Mount Eliza, Victoria, which seemed to suit her better. She excelled, was named head girl and won the top prize in 1943. She subsequently studied at the National Gallery School, where she was awarded a coveted travelling scholarship.

Following her graduation, the gifted and hyperactive Australian was unable to use her travelling scholarship because of World War II raging; instead she enlisted with the Navy. Posted to a quiet billeting in Albert Park, Victoria, young Walker resigned. She next signed on with the Women's Auxiliary Service, Burma (Wasbees, the Australian equivalent of the WAVES), which sent her to Rangoon.

Following the war, Walker moved to England for a brief time before returning to Australia to work for British Signals Intelligence. Back in Australia, she married Geoffrey Levett, a successful businessman who produced his own line of frozen vegetables. His new wife went to work in the business, gaining her pilot's licence so she could fly her husband to meetings across the continent. Not content with half-measures, the new Mrs Levett gained a commercial pilot's licence, and then learned how to parachute—presumably in case her pilot's skills failed. Subsequently, she flew an air race around Victoria.

In the early 1960s, the couple found a new avocation. They leased a filly named Never on Sunday. The horse turned out to be a winner, and soon they were breeding racehorses as well as racing them. They took up the Lyndhurst Lodge stud farm in Cranbourne, Victoria, and later also had the Willowmavin stud farm in Kilmore, before finally settling on Willowmavin. The venture was a success. In 1966 the Levetts won the Victoria Derby with their horse Khalifa; in the following year Khalifa won the VRC St Leger.

The couple also won the Perth and Brisbane Cups and countless lesser races. Their best finish in the Melbourne Cup was third. The Levetts co-owned the horse Buoyant Bird with former Australian Prime Minister Bob Hawke.

Robin Levett served for years on the committee of the famous Kilmore Turf Club, and as president from 1989 to 1994, the only woman ever elected president of a grade one Australian turf club. Despite her consuming involvement in horse racing and breeding, she found time to open a wildlife reserve at Willowmavin, where she included rescued animals into everyday life. "Guests in the committee room at Flemington would be bemused", said the Australian newspaper The Age in its obituary of the racing legend, "when she would pull a young wombat from a large shoulder bag and feed it from a bottle."

Following the death of her husband Geoffrey Levett in 1990, Robin Levett was forced to close Willowmavin stud farm and its wildlife refuge. She took up writing to fill the void. Her first and most successful book, a novel entitled The Girls, was based on her experience growing up the third of three daughters of a military man. The book twice hit the bestseller lists in Australia, and led to her meeting her publisher – and second husband—Nick Hudson, whom she eventually married at age 77 (he was 70).

Levett showed the same sure touch in her writing as she did in horse breeding. Her novella entitled The Rangoon Incident, based loosely on her experiences in Burma, began with this beguiling and macabre sentence: "I was at a murder once." The book went on to recount an incident in Rangoon in which a military officer sitting next to Levett in the officers' club was shot in the head and died in Levett's lap, a case of mistaken identity by a jealous husband.

"I really enjoyed working with her immensely", recalled her publisher husband Hudson. "This was strange, because we really had very little in common. She had made a career in the racing industry, running two stud farms, owning a string of successful racehorses, becoming president of the Kilmore Turf Club, and being named First Lady of Australian Racing, while I had never been near an Australian racetrack and regarded the industry and its adherents with contempt. Anyway, the long and the short of it was that we started living together, first at weekends and then full time."

Continuing to write under the Levett name, the racing enthusiast turned out a second book about horseracing called Bloodstock. The Sydney Morning Herald called it the best book ever written about horse racing in Australia. For many years Levett had travelled to Kashmir, initially to fly fish, a hobby she had taken up from her father. Kashmir became one of the loves of her life, not simply the fishing but the people, the customs, and the landscape. Recalled her publisher husband: "Visiting Kashmir with her made me understand what it's like to be the Duke of Edinburgh, constantly bathing in his wife's glory. Robin has friends at all social levels."

"One day during our last trip," Hudson recalled of the couple's last journey to Kashmir, "we attended a European-style lunch party with the cream of the Kashmiri political elite, including an ex-Chief Minister (the equivalent of a State Premier), and then went on to sit on the floor in the home of a boatman who paddles a shikara on the Dal Lake, being offered traditional Kashmiri hospitality. What did our hosts have in common? They were both personal friends of Robin's."

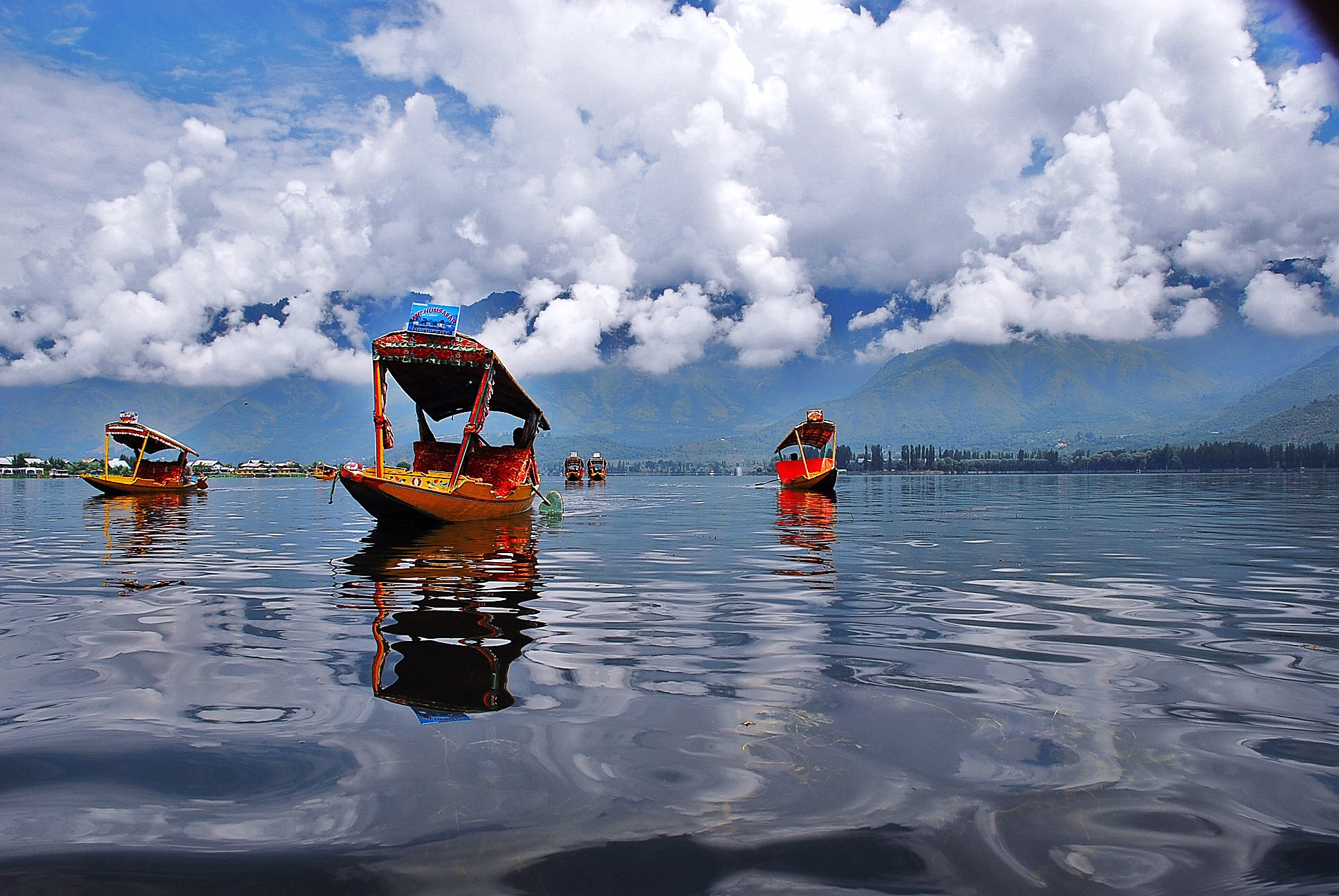
Dal Lake, Kashmir, beloved by Australian author Robin Levett

Levett devoted a book to her experiences in Kashmir, which she visited every year since 1972 (including the years of intense civil war), calling it The Shikari. Its twin subjects were an unlikely pairing: the wonders of fly fishing and the horrors of civil war. Critics were enraptured with the work, some calling it Levett's finest. As for Levett, she continued to travel to Kashmir each year, and supported several Kashmiri families.

Levett continued to travel abroad and across Australia in her last years, and visited her beloved Kilmore Turf Club at every opportunity. After being named "The First Lady of Australian Racing" in the 1990s, she was a popular hostess and guest at race-related events. Following Levett's death on 14 August 2008, from pneumonia, there was a send-off at the Kilmore Turf Club in her honour. The Kilmore track now runs a Robin Levett Memorial race in honour of the pilot, parachutist, traveller, writer and naturelover.
