= Gilbert de Lyvet =

Anglo-Norman nobleman (died c. 1244)

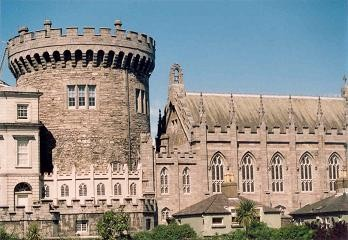
Norman Tower, Dublin Castle, Gilbert de Lyvet, early Norman mayor of Dublin

Gilbert de Lyvet (died ca. 1244) was an early Anglo-Norman nobleman and merchant who became one of the earliest Mayors of Dublin. He donated extensive properties to the Cathedral of the Holy Trinity in Dublin, acted as a witness for early gifts to the cathedral, and was a partisan for the Bigods, the de Clares, the de Lacys and other Norman magnates.

== Biography ==
=== Early life ===
The birthplace of Gilbert de Lyvet is unknown, although he was likely born in Sussex, England, where the Levett family had their seat from about the time of the Norman Conquest. The family later became Lords of the Manor of Firle, Sussex, and received extensive grants of land across the south of England. They were sublords of the de Ferrers family, originating from the village of Livet in Normandy within the original de Ferrers barony.

=== Mayor ===
Gilbert de Lyvet was a citizen of Dublin from 1229–1244. He served as Mayor of Dublin for four one-year terms, 1233–1234, 1235–1236, and was re-elected for a third term from 1236–1237. de Lyvet was frequently engaged in business in the city, and was a partisan of the most powerful Norman lords of Ireland. He was a witness to a 1210 gift by Isabel de Clare, 4th Countess of Pembroke to The Cathedral of the Holy Trinity, in honour of her father Richard de Clare, 2nd Earl of Pembroke, whose 'Strongbow' tomb is within the Cathedral. de Lyvet was also a merchant with wide trading interests, and old Irish records note that he often traded with France using his own ships. He is frequently in Latin charters relating to church business in Dublin.

de Lyvet acted in state matters involving the King of Connaught, the De Clares, the le Bruns, the De Burghs, Dermot MacMurrough, the Marshals and others. In 1234, de Lyvet and his wife also made gifts of land, including a "stone hall and cellars outside the King's gate" to the Holy Trinity Church, today's Cathedral of the Holy Trinity. de Lyvet and his wife lived in a stone hall not far from the church itself, "without the King's Gate." de Lyvet owned land on nearby Castle Street as well.

=== Family ===
de Lyvet founded a family which succeeded him in Ireland, and for a time his family became among the most powerful Anglo-Irish families. The patriarch mayor died before 1244, and he and his wife Sibilla are buried within Holy Trinity Church. Their daughter Elena is mentioned in the Register of the Hospital of St. John the Baptist in Dublin outside the New Gate.

Philip de Livet, probably Gilbert's father but possibly a brother, was involved in a Dublin dispute in 1200 which escalated into violence. Involved were some of the most powerful Norman magnates including the le Brun Lusignan family, Robert de Winchester, William Warenne and others. A murder charge resulted from the fracas involving the group.

=== Son ===
Geoffrey de Lyvet, likely Gilbert's son, owned a "great stone hall" in the city, according to contemporaneous records. Sir Philip de Lyvet, Knight, probably also a son of Gilbert, was identified in early records as a "kinsman" of William Brun, one of Dublin's most important citizens. In 1278, Sir Gilbert Lyvet, Knight, is listed in a petition of Maurice FitzMaurice to the King and Council. Sir Gilbert Lyvet was also an active businessman in the city. Reginald Lyvet, probably either a son or grandson of Gilbert, was named by Roger Bigod, 5th Earl of Norfolk and marshall of England, as Bigod's Irish attorney for the year in which Bigod would be away in Wales on the King's business.

=== de Livet family ===
Documents from the late twelfth and early thirteenth centuries show that the de Livet family was active in Ireland, frequently being named in Royal writs and orders. In September 1215, for instance, Gilbert de Livet was named in a Royal order requiring him and several others to go to the King of Connaught and collect fees and fines from him due to the English crown. Other documents from the same century show Philip de Livet, John de Livet and other members of the family frequently acting on behalf of the King, or deputized to adjudicate disputes. In one case, the King even commands Earl William Marshall of Ireland to permit a servant of Gilbert de Livet, citizen of Dublin, to retain a ship he had captured as part of the capture of La Rochelle, France.

Subsequent documents over the next century saw the family's influence still strong. After Gilbert de Roche was beheaded for his betrayal for siding with the Scots in their Ireland invasion, for instance, the King ordered that all Roche's lands be turned over to John Lyvet.

=== Sheriff ===
"Gilbert de Lynet (Lyvet) was of sufficient importance to be Sheriff of Connaught from 1287 to 1289," according to The History of the County of Mayo to the Close of the Sixteenth Century. "The family appear again as owners of half the castle and lands of Carn – the other half owned by Carews – and of the lands of Kincon, Ellagh, and Seehaunmore in Kilfian."

By 1302, John Lyvet was granted arms in Ireland, and in 1311 was appointed steward of Carlow with the keeping of Old Ros and the Isle of Hervey, as well as the Knights Templar's hamlet of Kilclogan in Wexford. (A branch of the Dublin Levett family apparently relocated to Waterford at some later date, as the first family member appears as mayor in the early seventeenth century.) In 1302 King Edward I of England issued a call to convene the magnates of Ireland to assist in an invasion against the Scots. John de Lyvet was one of the Irish nobles named in the writ.

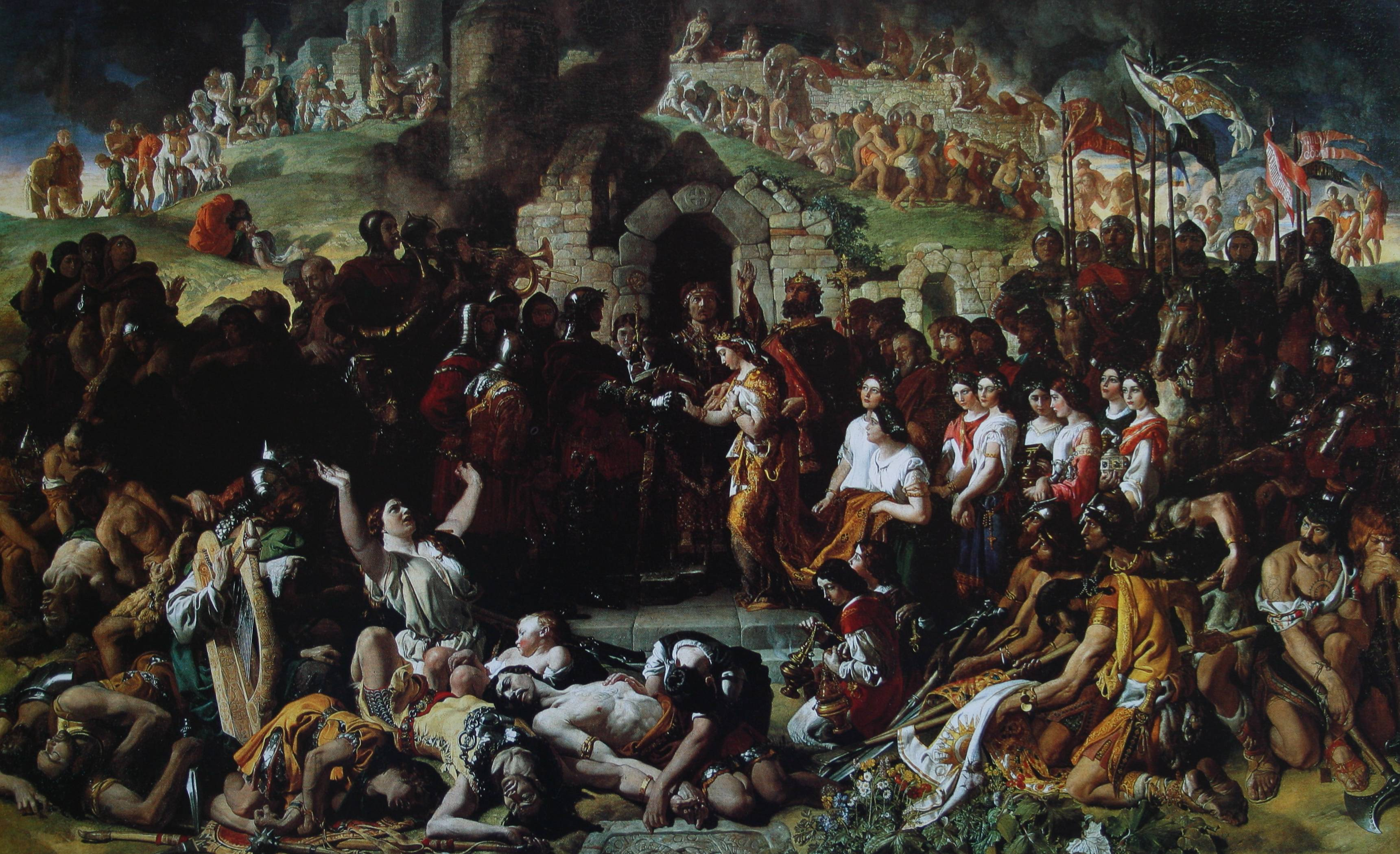
Marriage of 'Strongbow'and Aiofe: Norman occupation of Ireland a complicated affair by Daniel Maclise

The de Lyvet family were one of the earliest of the Anglo-Irish families, but unlike other early Normans like the de Burghs and the De Lacys, the Levetts seem to have been largely overlooked by historians. Perhaps the orthography made them difficult to trace: the spelling of the name varied wildly, including 'de Liuet,' 'de Lyvet', 'de Leuet', 'de Lyuet,' 'de Lynet,' 'Linet', and even 'de Yvet" and "Del Ynet." One historian assures us that "at the commencement of the reign of Edward II, the De Lynets were a powerful family in the south of Ireland." By the seventeenth century, an Irishman named Levett had registered his coat of arms, and it was distinct from those of his English brethren, which was unsurprising given that the first Levetts who came to Ireland did so as heraldry was only beginning to come into use.

== See also ==
- Norman Ireland
- List of rulers of Waterford
- Hiberno-Norman
- Walter de Burgh, 1st Earl of Ulster
