= Thomas Levett (priest) =

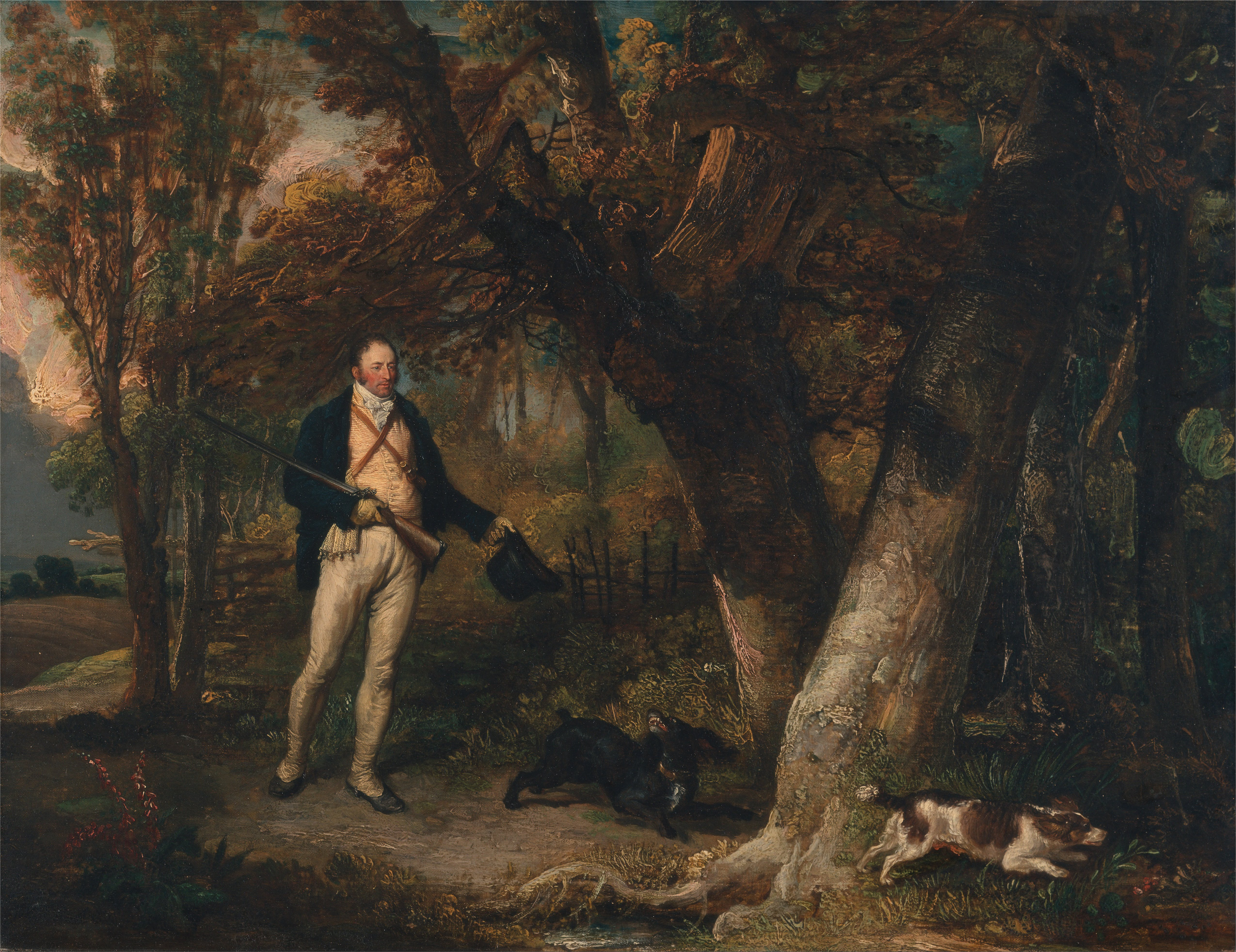
Portrait of the Rev Thomas Levett and Favourite Dogs Cock-Shooting, oil on canvas, James Ward, 1811.

Rev. Thomas Levett (baptised 25 February 1770 – 9 October 1843) served as rector of Whittington, Staffordshire, for 40 years, and as a large landowner in addition to being a clergyman, played a role in the development of Staffordshire's educational system. He was also a member of one of Staffordshire's longest-serving families in ecclesiastical circles, having produced three rectors of the parish of Whittington. The Levett family also produced members of parliament, High Sheriffs of Staffordshire, Lichfield town recorders and businessmen who were friends and contemporaries of Samuel Johnson, Erasmus Darwin, writer Anna Seward, actor David Garrick and other local luminaries. Several streets in Lichfield are named for the family.

== Biography ==
Rev. Thomas Levett was the son of Thomas Levett of Packington Hall and nephew of John Levett, Member of Parliament; and the grandson of Theophilus Levett, Lichfield town clerk in the early eighteenth century. He matriculated at Christ Church, Oxford in 1788, graduating B.A. in 1792.

Large landowners, the Levett family also made liberal endowments to the church at Whittington. Rev. Levett lived in Packington Hall, a Levett family property that had been acquired in the eighteenth century. The same Levett family also lived at Wychnor Hall at nearby Wychnor, Staffordshire. The family also owned the ancient woods at Hopwas, Staffordshire, a holding inherited by Rev. Thomas Levett.

== Career ==
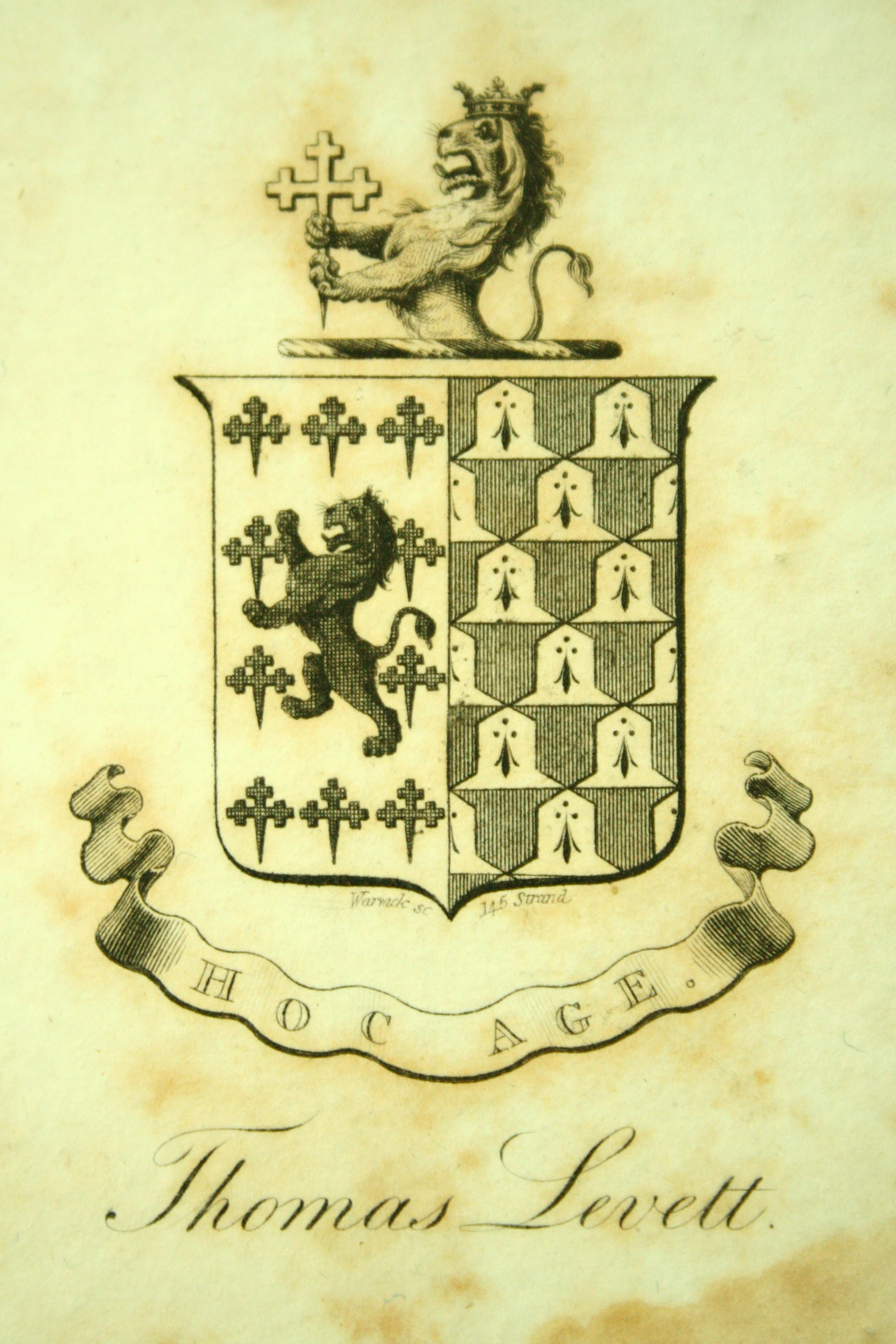
Bookplate of the Rev. Thomas Levett, Arms of Levett impaling Gresley, Packington Hall, Staffordshire

Levett was early interested in education in the region in which his ancestors had lived for more than a century. He was among family members managing a family bequest to the local schools. Rev. Richard Levett served as Whittington's vicar from 1743 to 1751. His son, also Rev. Richard Levett, served as vicar of Whittington from 1795 to 1796; and Rev. Thomas Levett served for forty years, from 1796 to 1836. There are memorials to the Levett family in St. Giles Church in the village, located about three miles (5 km) from Lichfield. Large landowners, the family also established charitable gifts towards the Whittington Free School, and were generous donors to schools and other foundations in the county.

Thomas Levett was also a well-known sportsman, and frequently hunted with family friend British general and royal aide William Dyott, whose family lived at nearby Freeford Hall. The artist James Ward, a longtime family friend, painted the rector as he hunted at Packington in a canvas called Portrait of the Rev. Thomas Levett and Favourite Dogs, Cock-Shooting, 1811.

Thomas Levett was married to Wilmot Maria Gresley, daughter of Sir Nigel Bowyer Gresley, 7th Baronet of Drakelowe Hall, High Sheriff of Derbyshire in 1780, of the Gresley Baronets, a family seated at their Drakelow Derbyshire manor since the end of the eleventh century. Following his marriage, Rev. Levett quartered the arms of Levett with those of his wife's family. She died 17 December 1845. Memorials to Wilmot Maria Gresley and her husband Rev. Levett are in St. Giles Church in Whittington. The couple had no children.

Packington Hall, designed by architect James Wyatt, sat in 1,000 acres (4.0 km^{2}) of parkland owned by Thomas Levett. Situated just over three miles (5 km) from Lichfield, where the first Staffordshire Levett had served as town clerk in the early eighteenth century, Packington Hall home was the residence of successive generations of Levetts. The home was remarkable for its avenues of old oaks and elms.

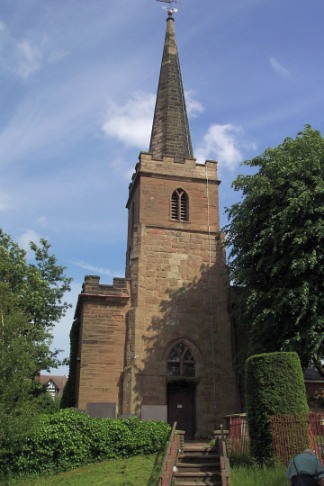
St Giles Church, Whittington. Burial place of Rev. Thomas Levett and Maria Wilmot Gresley Levett

Another distant branch of the Sussex Levett family lives at Milford Hall in the same county. The two branches of the family were reunited when in the late nineteenth century a Wychnor Levett married a Milford Hall Levett.

== Sources ==
- The Levetts of Staffordshire, Dyonese Levett Haszard, Milford, Staffordshire, privately printed
