= Francis Levett (merchant) =

British merchant

- Born: 1654; London, England
- Died: 1705 (aged 50–51)
- Other name: Francis Levet
- Occupation: Merchant
- Known for: Built a trading empire importing commodities mainly from the Levant
- Spouse: Susan Holt (m. 1683)

Francis Levett (alias Levet) (1654–1705) was a British Turkey Merchant (member of the Levant Company) of the City of London who in partnership with his brother Sir Richard Levett, Lord Mayor of London, built a trading empire, importing and distributing tobacco and other commodities, mainly from the Levant. He served as Warden of the Worshipful Company of Mercers.

Francis and his brother Sir Richard, who served as Master of the Haberdashers' Company, were among the largest factors of their day in England, with an immense working capital estimated between £30,000 and £40,000 in 1705, buying tobacco around the world for importation into the English market. Francis Levett served as a partner in the trading firm of Sir Richard Levett & Co.

== Career ==
The Levett brothers were members of the Worshipful Company of Haberdashers, haberdashers being merchants who traded in commodities and textiles and acted generally as venture capitalists. Once they had imported tobacco and other goods, the Levetts distributed the commodities to their 'chapmen' across the country through fairs, including those at Lenton, Gainsborough, Boston, Lincolnshire, and Beverley. Francis Levett's brother Richard's home was located close by the Haberdashers Hall in Cripplegate.

The Levetts were among the earliest English merchants to vertically integrate their trading empire, owning their own ships to transport the goods they sold. Their trading extended as far afield as Turkey and India, where they had interests in the early London East India Company, to North America, Portugal, Africa and elsewhere.

The Levetts eventually operated on larger scale than those from whom they bought tobacco. Aside from acting as wholesalers and shippers, the Levett brothers acted as lenders to the retail tobacconists who purchased their wares. Sons of a Puritan vicar from a once-mighty family, the Levett brothers had no choice but to slowly build their business from scratch, networking like ancient yuppies. Their dealings exposed them to the go-go operators of the day, including the Blackborne, Sweetapple, Lemon, Hulse and Thoroton families, with whom they intermarried.

It was a lucrative franchise. A tax assessment for 1695 lists Francis Levett and his wife having a footman and a maid at their London residence. Levett owned a country home at Enfield, Middlesex as well. (His brother, Sir Richard, fared even better, owning two country homes at Kew, Richmond—both of which, including Kew Palace, his heirs later sold to the Royal family—and a spacious London home.) The brothers were sons of Rev. Richard Levett of Ashwell, Rutland, and the family's roots lay in Sussex.

== Legacy ==
The Levett brothers's accomplishments as merchants allowed them to indulge their wants in ways unfamiliar to vicars' sons. These early London merchants were straddling the old feudal economy which, abetted by increasing English political and military might, was evolving into a modern trading one. The first beneficiaries were these pioneers who, trading for their own account, risked failure in the fast-moving marketplace. The Levett brothers built an early trading juggernaut.

== Personal life ==
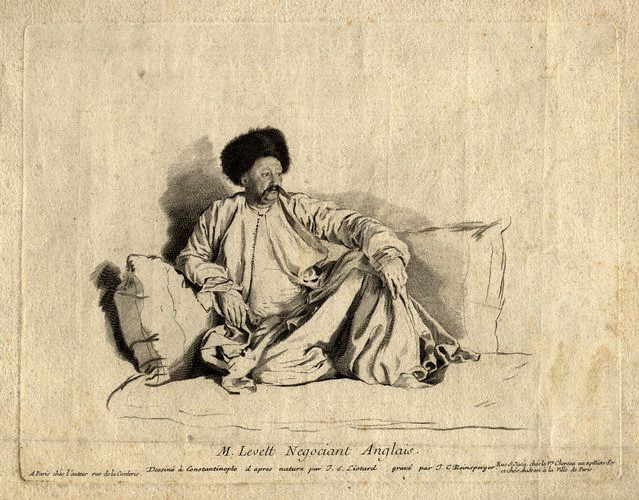
Portrait in Turkish costume of Francis Levett (1700–1764), after the painting by Jean-Étienne Liotard in the Louvre Museum, Paris. National Portrait Gallery, London

In 1683 Francis Levett married Susan, the daughter of Sir Thomas Holt and sister of Sir John Holt, Lord Chief Justice of England. Levett's brother-in-law was merchant Edward Leman, who married Sir Thomas Holt's daughter Mary by his wife Susan Peacock. The London mercantile world of those days was a small club: Lord Mayor Levett, Francis's brother, had a son Richard, who became a London alderman and married the daughter of Sir John Sweetapple, goldsmith, Sheriff and alderman of the City. These tight social and political connections helped the Levetts build their trading empire.

Francis Levett's son Richard, a member of Oriel College, Oxford, and a barrister at the Inner Temple, served as an Alderman of London. He was later buried within Temple Church. Another son, Henry, who took B.A. and M.A. degrees from Magdalen College, Oxford, died at age 25 in 1726. A third son, Francis Levett Jr., lived much of his life at Livorno, Italy, and served as chief representative of the Levant Company at Constantinople 1737–1750. He was a director of the London Assurance Corporation, and a benefactor of Morden College. He lived much of his life at Livorno, and died at Nethersole, Kent, 21 February 1764. Catherine, the daughter of Francis Levett, London merchant, married Ebenezer Ibbetson, a London merchant and son of Leeds, Yorkshire, cloth merchant Samuel Ibbetson. Their descendant Levett Landon Boscawen Ibbetson was a well-known English geologist, inventor and one of the pioneers of photography.

== Death ==
At Francis Levett's death in 1705, his widow disposed of his interest in several ships, selling them to William Love, a London merchant.
