= Ralph Levett =

Rev. Ralph Levett (1600 – c. 1660) was an English Anglican minister who served as domestic chaplain to an aristocratic family from Lincolnshire with Puritan sympathies, who subsequently installed him as rector of a local parish. A graduate of Christ's College, Cambridge, where he became a protégé of the prominent Puritan minister John Cotton, Levett later married the sister of the wife of his friend Rev. John Wheelwright, another well-known early Puritan settler of New England.

== Biography ==
=== Early life ===
Ralph Levett was born in 1600 in High Melton, West Riding of Yorkshire to an old Yorkshire family, the Levetts, previously seated at Normanton and Hooton Levitt. His father, Thomas Levett, was of middling rank in the local gentry, not owning the manor at High Melton, but identified as 'gent.' in local records. Ralph Levett's mother was Elizabeth Mirfin of a family who owned the manor of Thurcroft.

Levett enrolled at Christ's College, Cambridge, in 1617, where he took his B.A. and M.A. degrees, and was ordained in 1624, when he was named a deacon at York. Following his ordination, Levett spent time in the Boston household of Rev. John Cotton, a leading Puritan of his day. The practice of taking in postgraduate students for training in a Puritan rector's household was a well-established one, and Cotton had many such Cambridge acolytes, who came to learn the ways of carrying on a Puritan ministry.

=== Ashby cum Fenby ===
Following his time in Cotton's household, Levett took up his post as private chaplain with the household of Sir Christopher Wray in Ashby cum Fenby, Lincolnshire. Wray was the grandson of Sir Christopher Wray, Lord Chief Justice of England and Wales and a wealthy politician, having enriched himself with profits from the Royal mint. Sir Christopher Wray was lord of several manors in Yorkshire, as well as four others, including Grainsby, in Lincolnshire. His son Sir William, (1555–1617) was created baronet, and was the father of two sons: Sir John Wray and, by his second wife Frances, daughter of Sir William Drury of Hawstead, Suffolk, Sir Christopher Wray (1601–1646).

Although originally from Yorkshire, Levett apparently decided to remain in Lincolnshire. His post within the Wray family household, known as Puritan sympathisers, shielded Levett to some degree from the persecution by Archbishop William Laud of clergymen with Puritan sympathies. In 1636, by contrast, Levett's friend Wheelwright, whom he apparently knew at Cambridge, was driven from his post at Bilsby by the ecclesiastical authorities, and departed for the Massachusetts Bay Colony. (Wheelwright was following John Cotton, who himself had fled to Massachusetts three years earlier to avoid imprisonment for nonconformity.)

Still, the rigours of ministering to an aristocratic, if Puritan-inclined household, meant that Levett sometimes wrote to his former mentor Cotton for advice on handling tricky situations. In 1627 the novice Levett wrote Cotton, inquiring how to pray appropriately for his patroness when she was in the congregation, and Levett asked for particular guidance on dealing with entertainments he witnessed at Christmastime, including "cardinge" (card playing) as well as "mixt dancinge." Valentine's Day caught Levett unawares when he was approached by the household's "2. young Ladyes" and asked to draw a name from a hat. "His Puritan principles," writes Sargent Bush in his The Correspondence of John Cotton, "were clearly being challenged as he considered what was an appropriate response for him as a minister of God on the one hand and an employee of the family on the other. So he looked to his mentor for advice."

In Cotton's responses, one senses the subtle nuances required of some Puritan thinkers, as well as the collegial nature of the early Puritan ministerial cadre. Cotton gave Levett advice on how to pray for his patroness without appearing to flatter her, and he warned Levett against 'carding' and drawing names at Valentine's as they were 'lotteries.' Cotton had no problem with dancing, except "lasciuious dauncinge to wanton dittyes & in amorous gestures & wanton dalliances especially after great feasts."

In 1632, five years after Levett's letter to Cotton, Lincolnshire records show the marriage of "Mr. Ralfe Levit and Anne Hutchinson" in Bilsby, the parish of Rev. John Wheelwright and not far from Ashby cum Fenby. Anne Hutchinson was the daughter of Edward Hutchinson of Alford, and the sister of Mary Hutchinson, Wheelwright's second wife. Mary Hutchinson, John Wheelwright's wife, was the sister-in-law of her brother William Hutchinson's wife, another Anne Hutchinson, who later became prominent in the Massachusetts Antinomian controversy.

=== Grainsby ===
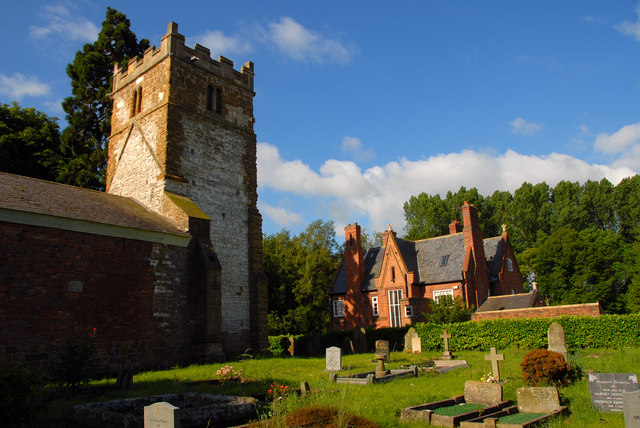
St Nicholas, Grainsby and the rectory

Unlike his Puritan friends, Levett elected to remain in England. He left his post as domestic chaplain to the Wray family for the post of rector in a manor owned by his Wray patrons. In 1633 he began signing the transcripts at the church at Grainsby as 'Radulphus Levet, rector.' On 3 April 1635, when the previous rector Thomas Humphrey was buried, 'Ralph Levitt, M.A.' was presented to the rectory of the tiny village of Grainsby by Frances, widow of Sir William Wray. Perhaps the Wray family's endorsement provided Levett some measure of protection, or his brother's position as Chancellor and Commissary to the Archbishop of York helped shield him from persecution.

Levett apparently held the living of Grainsby until at least 1649, when he signed the transcripts as 'R. Levet, rector.' His son Francis graduated at Queens' College, Cambridge, also became a minister, and was rector of Little Carlton, Lincolnshire, from 1662 until 1711. (When the emigrant Rev. John Wheelwright finally disposed of the last of his Lincolnshire property in 1677, Massachusetts records attest that it was "purchased of Francis Levett, gentleman," likely the son of his old friend Ralph Levett).

=== Family ===
Ralph Levett's two brothers were both prominent Oxford-educated lawyers. His brother Thomas Levett served as High Sheriff of Rutland, and his brother John Levett was a well-known figure in York legal circles, frequently representing the Archbishop of York. The two improvident brothers apparently dissipated what was a large estate of properties scattered across Yorkshire. Thomas Levett was well known as an antiquarian, and his disposal of monastic charters descended in the Levett family to Roger Dodsworth for publication was an important event in Yorkshire historical circles. Another brother, Peter Levett, also graduated from Christ's College, Cambridge, and became parish priest at Cantley, South Yorkshire, and Boynton, East Riding of Yorkshire, successively.
