= John Levett (author) =

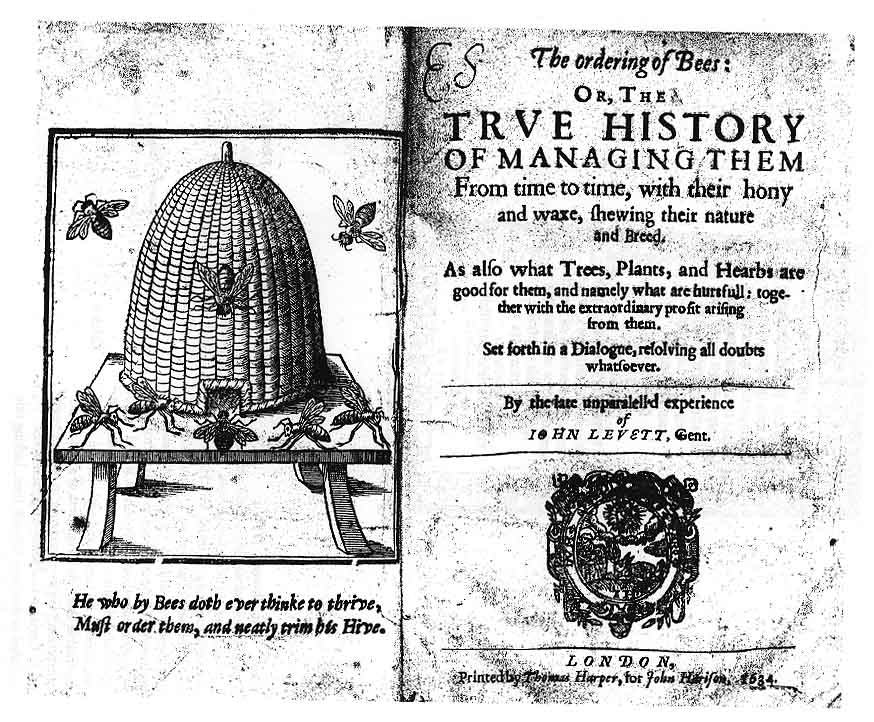
Title page, The Ordering of Bees: Or, The True History of Managing Them, by John Levett, Gent., published by Thomas Harper, London, 1634

John Levett (also spelt Levit or Leavett) was a 17th-century English naturalist who was the author of a ground-breaking early study of the habits of bees, with close observation of their behaviour and suggestions on how to manage their hives, published in London in 1634. The Ordering of Bees: Or, The True History of Managing Them was one of the first agricultural textbooks, with a preface in rhyme by the author Samuel Purchas. It is among the earliest examples of what later became a flood of literature treating the English love of gardening and horticulture.

Johns Levett's biography is unclear, but he is identified as a gentleman and had advanced education. He is thought to have been a clergyman, and possibly the nephew of English explorer Capt. Christopher Levett, one of the earliest explorers of New England. His book is dedicated to a member of the Suffolk gentry, and perhaps Levett was serving there.

His book was considered groundbreaking because it combined close observation of bees with field experience in managing beehives. Levett explored the debate over bee gender, and over their means of reproducing. Levett's work quickly became the favoured book on the subject. Robert Child, the foremost agriculture writer of his day, said of Levett: "Hee is the best that ever write of this subject."

At least part of Levett's appeal, aside from his careful study of his subjects, was his somewhat sly sense of humour. The drones, Levett warned, were "necessary and helpfull [sic] to the Bees, so long as they exceed not a due proportion (much like to Our lawyers), but let their number grow to(o) great (as it often doth) and they will indeed devoure the substance of the Bees (as the Lawyers of the Commonwealth) and bring it to destruction."

In his discourse on bees, Levett drew many parallels to human society. The Master Bee, Levett wrote, had regal authority, "correcting the lazie, sloathfull, and disobedient, and giving honour and incouragement to those which are painfull, laborious and diligent." The Master Bees, Levett wrote, "are absolute in their authorities and commands," and were essential, Levett believed, in the organising the hierarchy of and ensuring the ultimate success of the hive.

The preface to Levett's book was written by "S. Purcas" in rhyme, who was undoubtedly English author and travel writer Samuel Purchas. "Thy selfe, thy self enough, enough thy Booke, Thy book commands, and I, my Levett, leave it, Here in small Bees, God's greatnesse first I looke, And thee thy selfe though dead to live yet."

Nor were the results of apian labours limited to simple honey. Bee products, Levett told his readers, could be used in domestic hygiene, physick and surgery. Levett was not troubled by the thought that the bee was placed on earth to serve man. In the sort of thinking that stamped the age of exploration and colonisation, Levett consigned the bee to his role as supporting player. "Hath not God given all creatures unto us for our benefit, and to be used accordingly as may seem good unto us for our good?," Levett wrote. "We see that many creatures of greater account are daily killed in infinite numbers for our sustenance and often for our pleasure, and is it not lawful for us, to use these silly creatures in such sort as they may be most for our benefit, which I take to be the right use of them and the very end of their creation?"

In Levett's worldview, nature was there to serve her master. It fell to man the task of "orderinge" the bees. Rather than simply observing, the beekeeper's job was to take the honey and kill the bees afterwards so the colony didn't raid honey from other unharvested colonies nearby. Levett dismissed the concerns of those who said it was "a pity to kill the bees that have so laboured for us," calling such talk "a foolish and fond conceit."

Eventually, advances in the study of bees and in agricultural theory would change the conception of the role of the beekeeper, who would eventually come to be seen as a manager of resources, rather than one set out to tame wild nature and bend it to man's purposes. The beekeeper would be turned into part of 'husbandry,' and a mainstay of the rural economy. But in Levett's worldview, what one scholar calls his "aggressively patriarchal" style, the bees should be driven and made to perform. "Bees might be superior to all other insects," writes Bee Wilson, "but they were still of a different estate from men."

English beekeeping remained largely unchanged for centuries, until the late nineteenth century when moveable-frame hives were invented. By that time, the new hives and improved artificial wax foundations, new smokers, even new breeds of bees meant that the beekeepers of John Levett's day became the more dignified 'apiarists'. In today's world of collapsing bee populations, the Levett model of 'bee domination,' a mirror of its epoch of exploration and colonisation, seems particularly dated.
