= Hopper Levett =

English cricketer

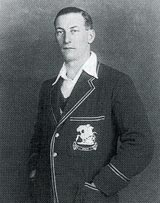

Personal information
- Full name: William Howard Vincent Levett
- Born: 25 January 1908; Goudhurst, Kent
- Died: 30 November 1995 (aged 87); Hastings, East Sussex
- Batting: Right-handed
- Role: Wicket-keeper

International information
- National side: England
- Only Test (cap 273): 5 January 1934 v India

Domestic team information
- Years: Team
- 1930–1947: Kent

Career statistics
Competition	Test	First-class
Matches	1	175
Runs scored	7	2,524
Batting average	7.00	12.25
100s/50s	0/0	0/2
Top score	5	76
Balls bowled	0	3
Wickets	–	0
Bowling average	–	–
5 wickets in innings	–	–
10 wickets in match	–	–
Best bowling	–	–
Catches/stumpings	3/0	283/195
- Source: CricInfo, 20 July 2009

William Howard Vincent "Hopper" Levett (25 January 1908 – 30 November 1995) was an English cricketer who played as a wicket-keeper for Kent County Cricket Club between 1930 and 1947.

Levett was born at Goudhurst in Kent and educated at Brighton College. He played in one Test match in 1934. He was a gentleman farmer from an old Kentish family that owned hop farms. He died at Hastings in Sussex.

== Bibliography ==
- Carlaw, Derek (2020). Kent County Cricketers, A to Z: Part Two (1919–1939) (PDF). Cardiff: ACS.
