= Levett Landon Boscawen Ibbetson =

English geologist

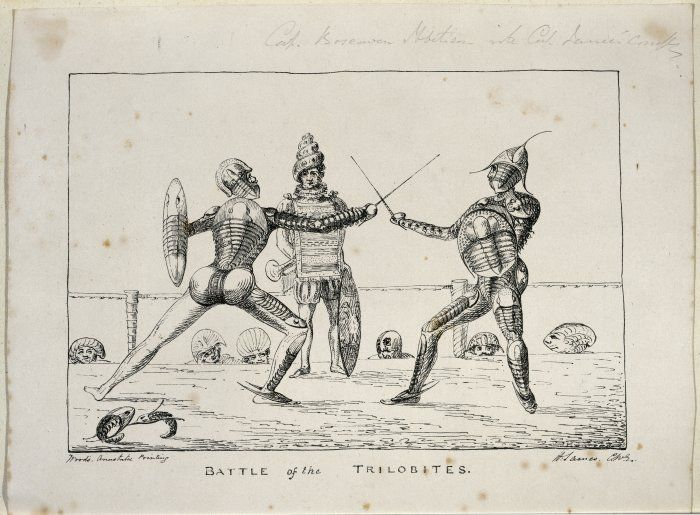
Capt. Levett Landon Boscawen Ibbetson dueling in a trilobite exoskeleton. Drawn by his friend Gideon Mantell, fellow member of the Royal Society.

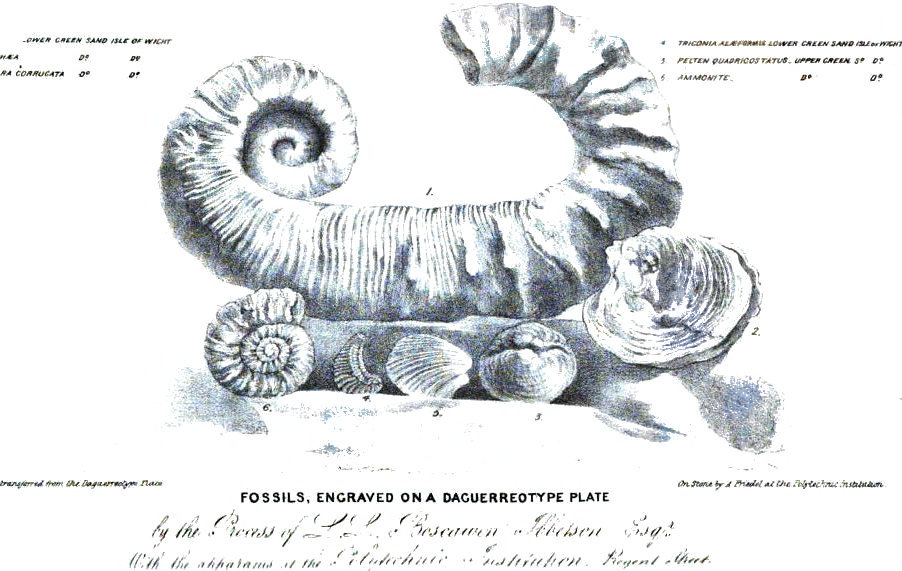
lFossils Engraved on a Daguerreotype Plate by the Process of L L Boscawen Ibbetson Esq. Lithograph by A. Friedel, Royal Polytechnic Institution, 1840. Capt. Ibbetson developed a method of taking lithographic impressions from daguerreotypes.

Captain Levett Landon Boscawen Ibbetson (1799 – 8 September 1869) was an English 19th century geologist, inventor, organiser and soldier. He is particularly associated with early developments in photography. He was a member of the London Electrical Society and later a Fellow of the Royal Society (elected 6 June 1850).

== Life ==
From his London home (46 Margaret Street, near Cavendish Square), Ibbetson corresponded with William Henry Fox Talbot in 1842, having spent some years trying to produce a lithograph from an original daguerreotype, writing "I have been going on with experiments in the Callotype & have had some very good results as to depth of Colour." Ten years later, in 1852, Ibbetson exhibited work produced using the Talbot calotype process, called Le Premier Livre Imprimè par le Soleil, at a London Society of Arts exhibition. This book, originally published in 1840, was an album of contact prints of ferns, grasses and flowers and used "the independently invented process of Friedrich Gerber of Bern, published in January 1839, when Ibbetson was residing in Bern."

An enthusiastic geologist, one of Ibbetson's finds on the Isle of Wight, the fossilised remains of a Hybodus, was sent to Sir Philip Malpas de Grey Egerton, and was discussed in the Proceedings of the Geological Society in 1845.

During the 1840s, Ibbetson was also engaged in various geological surveys associated with the expansion of the British railway system, during which work he corresponded with eminent geologist Henry Thomas De la Beche.

He wrote a book, with contributions from Edwin Lankester, published around 1852, entitled Notes on the geology and chemical composition of the various strata in the Isle of Wight ... With a map in relief. With Professor Edward Forbes, he produced a description of the geology between Blackgang Chine and Atherfield Point, in the Isle of Wight, for the Geological Society.

In 1851, Levett Ibbetson helped manage the Great Exhibition. At this event, public toilets were relatively novel, and Ibbetson was given the task of writing an 'Official Report on the Waiting Rooms and Washing Places in the Exhibition Building' - during which he recorded "The largest receipt from the Waiting Rooms was on Wednesday, 8 October 1851 when 11,171 persons made use of them".

Ibbetson died at Biebrich in Prussia, where he had lived for several years. Some years earlier he presented a valuable collection of fossils to the Museum of Practical Geology in London. His illustration of a fossil, "Transverse section of madrepore" in The Westminster Review of September 1840 is credited with being the first example of the use of limelight to shorten exposure times when making daguerreotypes.

== Works by L. L. Boscawen Ibbetson ==
- On the Tertiary and Cretaceous Formations of the Isle of Wight, co-authored with Prof. E. Forbes, 1844
- Notes on the Geology and Chemical Composition of the various Strata in the Isle of Wight, J. Van Voorst, London, 1849

== Family ==
Capt. Levett Landon Boscawen Ibbetson was the son of Sophy and Major Levett Ibbetson, who was son of James Ibbetson. He was the father of Major Henry Levett Boscawen Ibbetson of the 77th (East Middlesex) Regiment of Foot of the British Army. He also served in the 28th (North Gloucestershire) Regiment of Foot. Major Ibbetson lived at West Teignmouth, Devon, England.
