= Whirlow Brook Park =

Public garden in Sheffield, South Yorkshire, England

Coordinates: 53°20′35″N 01°32′24″W

Whirlow Brook Park is a landscaped garden of 39 acres (16 ha) in Whirlow, Sheffield, which are open to the public, containing Whirlow Brook Hall. It stretches from Ecclesall Road and joins on to Limb Brook Valley heading towards the Peak District, with an entrance to Whinfell Quarry Garden.

== History ==
Whirlow Brook Hall was built in 1906 (120 years ago) by Percy Fawcett, a director of Thomas Firth & Sons, with an elevated terrace giving fine views over Ecclesall Woods to Abbeydale. A stone in the rockery inscribed 1867–1897 names their six children. In 1920 the house was sold to his sister, Lily Marguerite 'Madge', who was married to Sir Walter Benton Jones, the son of a baronet and chairman/managing director of the United Steel Companies. They were keen gardeners and working with the Royal Horticultural Society along with six staff developed the grounds to include a Japanese rock garden, rose garden, rockery, shrubberies, two ponds and a lake.

Lady Jones died in 1938 and was buried in the grounds. Sir Walter moved to the family seat at Irnham Hall, Lincolnshire. In 1946 the house along with 39 acres of grounds was sold to a consortium, which included the Town Trustees, the J.G. Graves Charitable Trust and Sheffield Corporation, for £15,000; the grave of Lady Jones was moved. The grounds were opened to the public in 1951 as Whirlow Brook Park.

The house is now a venue for weddings, conferences and events.

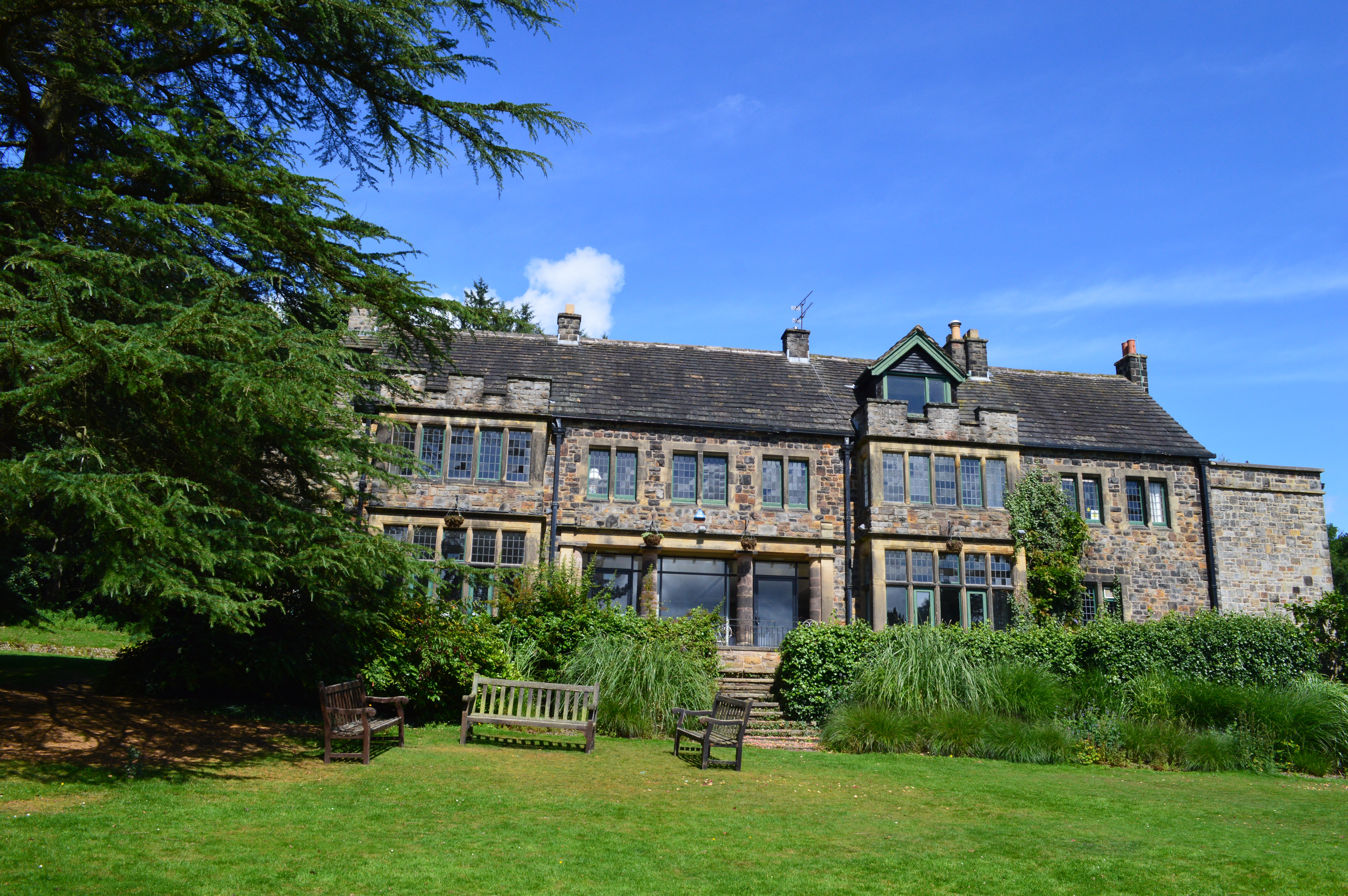
Whirlow Brook Hall

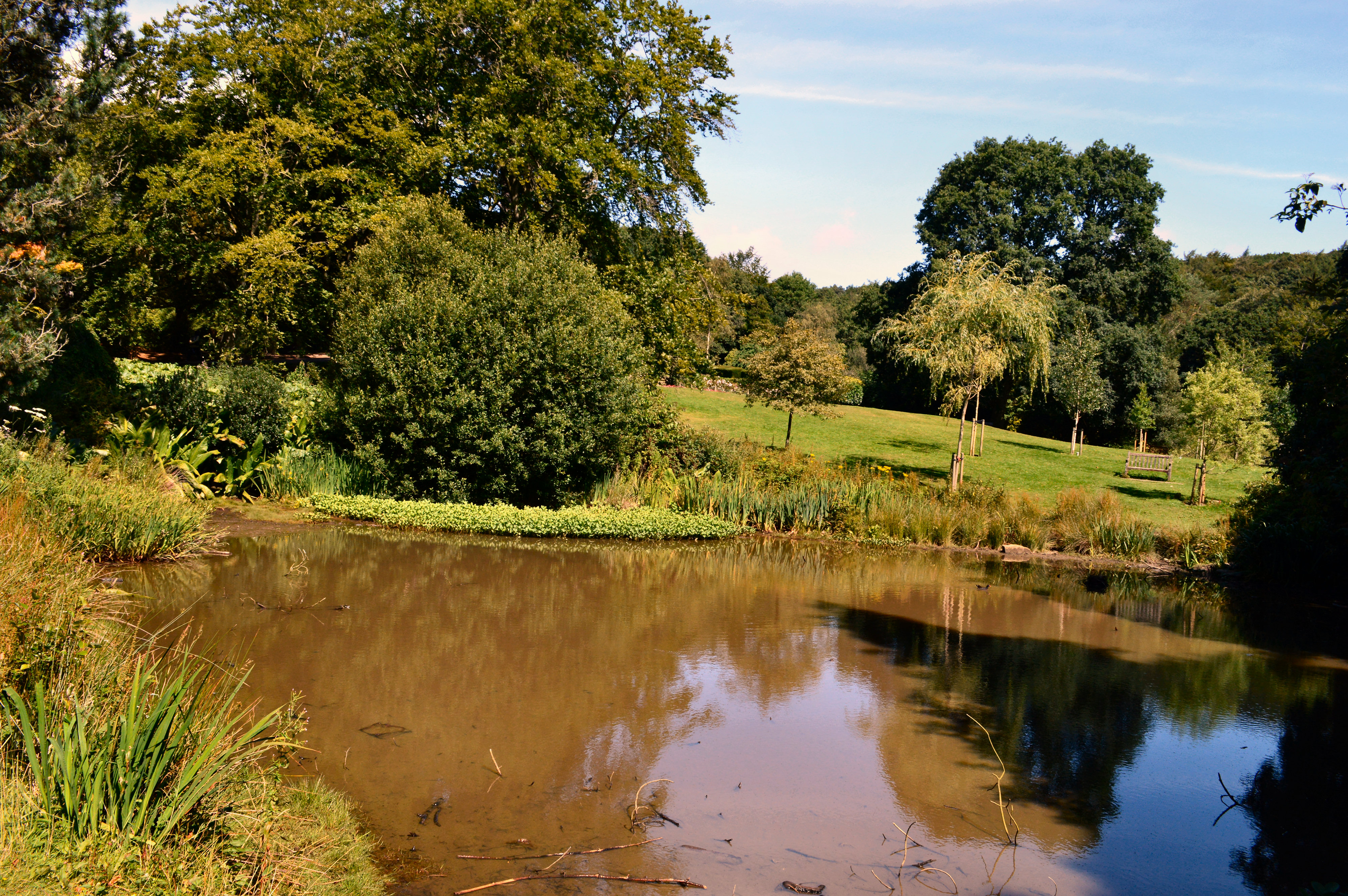
Whirlow Brook Park

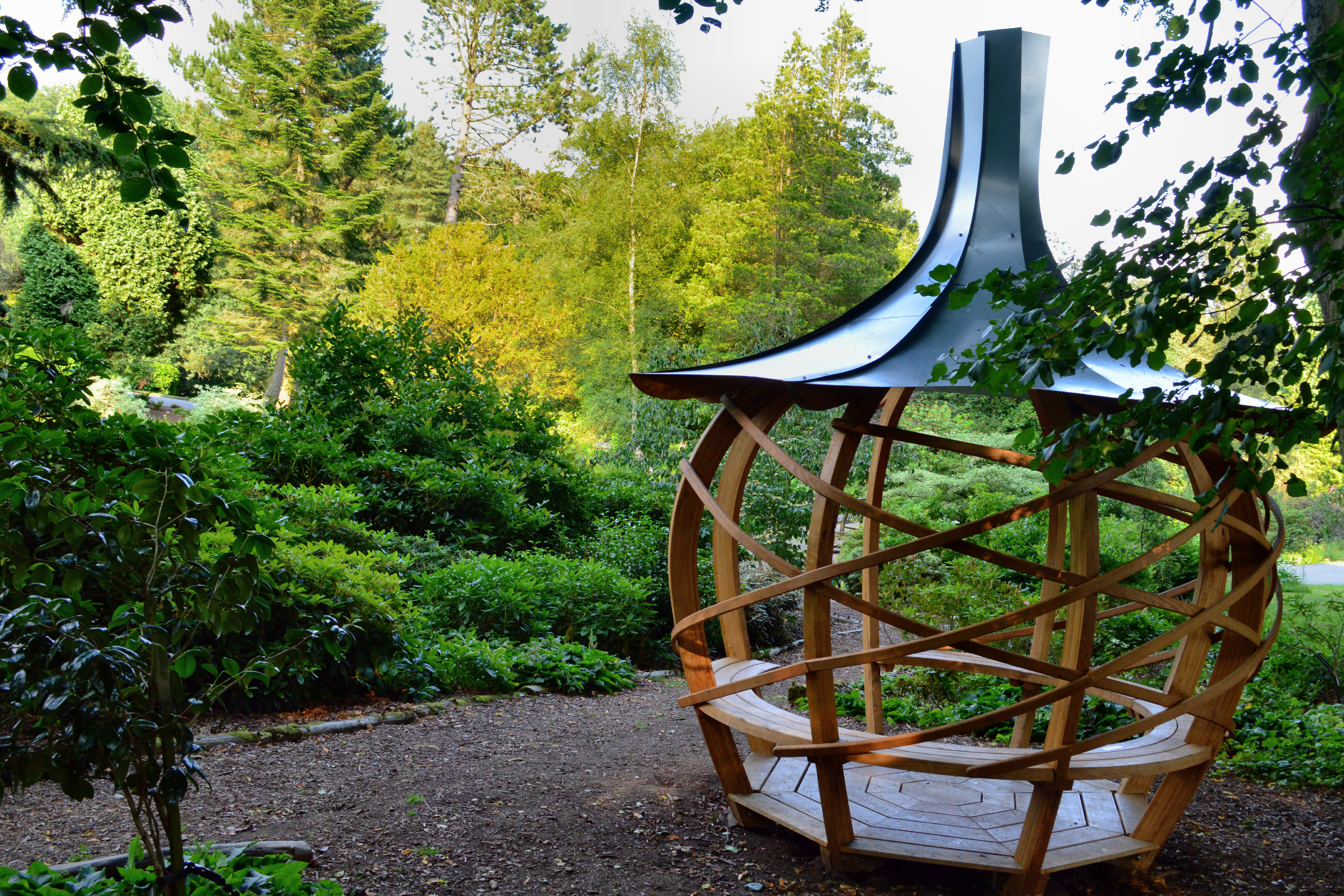
The Shelter

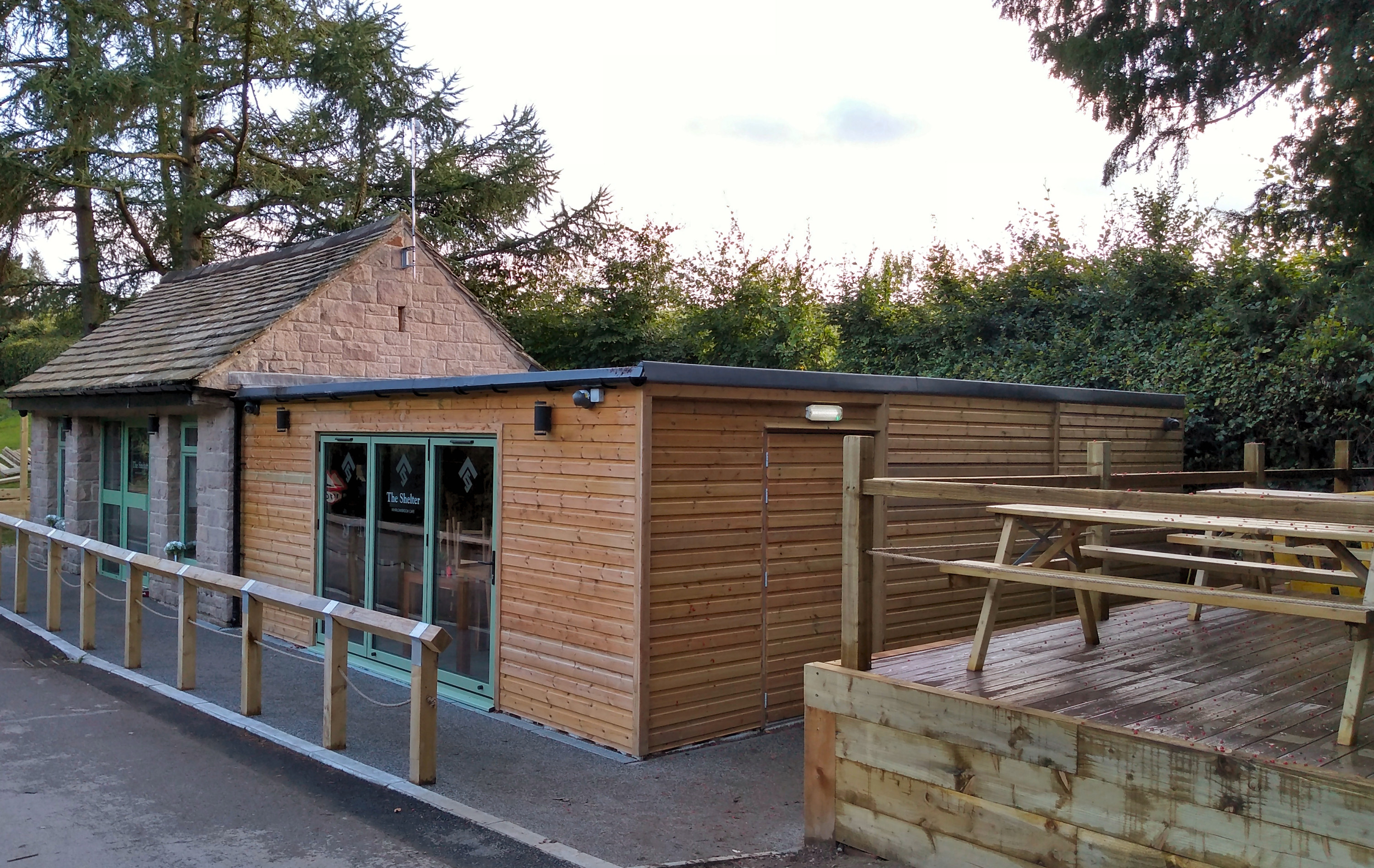
The Shelter Cafe

A Friends of Whirlow Brook Park was set up in 2021 to help fund the restoration of the gardens and a new shelter erected in the Commemorative Garden. In the summer concerts are held in the park. A Tree Trail was opened in 2023. The Shelter café and toilet opened in summer 2023.
