= Spear & Jackson =

British tool manufacturer

- Industry: Tool manufacturers
- Founded: 1760
- Founder: John Spear and Sam Jackson
- Headquarters: Atlas Way, Atlas North, Sheffield, S4 7QQ
- Area served: World
- Products: Gardening and Hand Tools
- Parent: SNH Global
- Website: http://www.spear-and-jackson.com

Spear & Jackson is a British manufacturer and supplier of gardening tools, hand tools, and precision instruments, headquartered in Sheffield, South Yorkshire, England. The company traces its origins to 1760, when Alexander Spear and John Love established a tool-making partnership in Sheffield. Over the following decades, it evolved into Spear & Jackson through the involvement of John Spear’s nephew and his apprentice Sam Jackson.

The business became closely associated with the Eclipse brand after James Neill patented composite steel in 1889 and launched products under the Eclipse trademark in 1909. Eclipse went on to pioneer the composite steel hacksaw blade in 1911, helping to establish Sheffield’s reputation as a global centre for high-quality steel tools.

Over the twentieth century the company underwent a series of ownership changes, becoming Spear & Jackson plc in 1995 and later part of Hong Kong–based United Pacific Industries. Since 2014, the brand has been owned by SNH Global. Today Spear & Jackson operates in more than 100 countries and continues to be linked with Sheffield’s long tradition of tool-making.

== Formation ==
In 1760, Alexander Spear and John Love formed a company in Sheffield called Spear & Love. In 1814, John Spear, the nephew of Alexander, took on an apprentice called Sam Jackson. In 1830, the partnership Spear & Jackson was formed.

== Eclipse ==
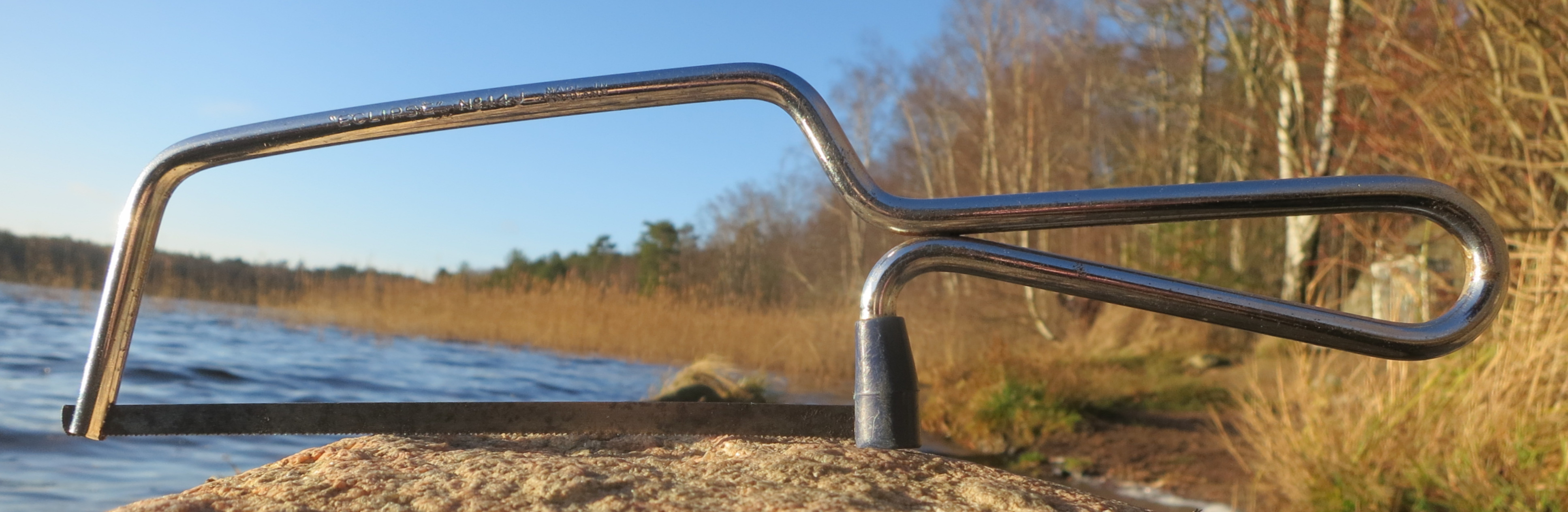
Hacksaw Eclipse 14J by Spear & Jackson

In 1889, James Neill patented composite steel – steel-backed iron. He registered his composite steel products under the Eclipse trademark in 1909. The name was taken from the famous racehorse Eclipse, who even though he had died over a hundred years earlier was still famous for his dominating success. The phrase "Eclipse first and the rest nowhere" was still in such common use that Neill adopted it as a marketing slogan for his products.

Eclipse made the world's first composite steel hacksaw blade in 1911. The company began manufacturing hacksaws in 1924. All hacksaws are now built according to their design.

== Ownership ==
The Spear & Jackson brand is owned by SNH Global, purchased from Hong Kong–based United Pacific Industries Limited in 2014. Initially bought by Neill Tools in 1985, when known as Spear & Jackson International plc. James Neill Tools, previously a family-owned business, initially made a public issue of shares in 1970. In 1989, the business' centenary year, Neill Tools was acquired by the MMG Patricof Group, which said it wanted to expand the business and refloat in c.5 years. In 1995, Neill Tools renamed itself Spear & Jackson plc. Its headquarters have always been in Sheffield. Previous Chairmen of the business, when still family-owned, were Sir Frederick Neill and Sir Hugh Neill.

== Tools ==
The company made handsaws from the beginning (1760); in 1833 Henry Disston, a toolmaker, emigrated to the United States and in 1840 started manufacturing saws. The Disston "skew-back" saw was introduced in 1874 and Spear and Jackson also introduced a skew-back design in the late 19th century, with one example being their 1887 Jubilee Saw.

== Market ==
It has activities in 115 countries.
