= Frederick Neill =

English businessman, public administrator, local politician and soldier

Sir Frederick Neill CBE, DSO, TD, JP, DL
- Born: 11 November 1891; Sheffield
- Died: 11 August 1967 (aged 75); Sheffield
- Education: Wrekin College
- Spouse: Winifred Margaret
- Children: 4
- Relatives: James Neill
- Military career
- Allegiance: United Kingdom
- Rank: Colonel
- Unit: 49th West Riding Divisional Engineers
- Commands: 49th West Riding Divisional Engineers
- Conflicts: First World War
- Awards: Distinguished Service Order
- Other work: Businessman, public administrator, local politician and soldier

Colonel Sir Frederick Austin Neill, CBE, DSO, TD, JP, DL (11 November 1891 – 11 August 1967) was an English businessman, public administrator, local politician and soldier.

== Early life ==
Frederick Austin Neill was born in Sheffield on 11 November 1891, the eldest surviving son of James Neill, JP, who was the founder of a number of steel tool manufacturing firms, including James Neill & Co. Ltd. and Hallamshire Steel Co. Ltd, which were held under the parent company James Neill Holdings Ltd.

== Career and honours ==
Neill attended Wrekin College and then spent two years in Germany to gain business experience; in 1910 he began working for the family company, and although he was appointed a director in 1916, he mostly spent the First World War in Europe. He had joined the 49th West Riding Divisional Engineers in 1913, serving with them in France from 1915 to 1918 and earning the Distinguished Service Order and the French Croix de Guerre in the process. After the War, Neill remained involved with the military; he was promoted to lieutenant-colonel in 1920, and from 1925 to 1930 commanded the 49th West Riding Divisional Engineers, being promoted to the rank of colonel in 1930. He was group commander for the Sheffield Defence Corps in 1940 and later commanded the Hallamshire Sector of the Home Guard, for which service he was appointed a Commander of the Order of the British Empire in 1942. From 1947 to 1965, he was honorary Colonel of his old unit, the 49th West Riding Divisional Engineers.

In the meantime, Neill had been appointed chairman and managing director of the family business in 1930, following his father's death; he became the first President of James Neill & Co. Ltd. in 1963. He served as Master Cutler of the Company of Cutlers in Hallamshire for the year 1937 to 1938, and was President of the Sheffield Chamber of Commerce from 1946 to 1948; he was also heavily involved with a range of industry associations, including the National Federation of Engineers' Tools Manufacturers and the regional council of the Federation of British Industries. Outside of business, Neill became a Deputy Lieutenant for West Riding in 1939 and a Sheffield magistrate in 1942; he was appointed High Sheriff of Yorkshire in 1955 and then seven years later he was appointed the first High Sheriff of Hallamshire. Neill was knighted in 1958 "for public services in the West Riding of Yorkshire".

A keen golfer, Neill played for Yorkshire. He died on 11 August 1967, aged 75, at his home Whinfell House, Whirlow, Sheffield; he was survived by his wife, Winifred Margaret, daughter of Robert Colver, JP, of Rockmount in Ranmoor; they had a son, Hugh, and three daughters.
