= Sharrow Mills =

Mill buildings in Sheffield, South Yorkshire, England

Coordinates: 53.368518°N 1.492869°W

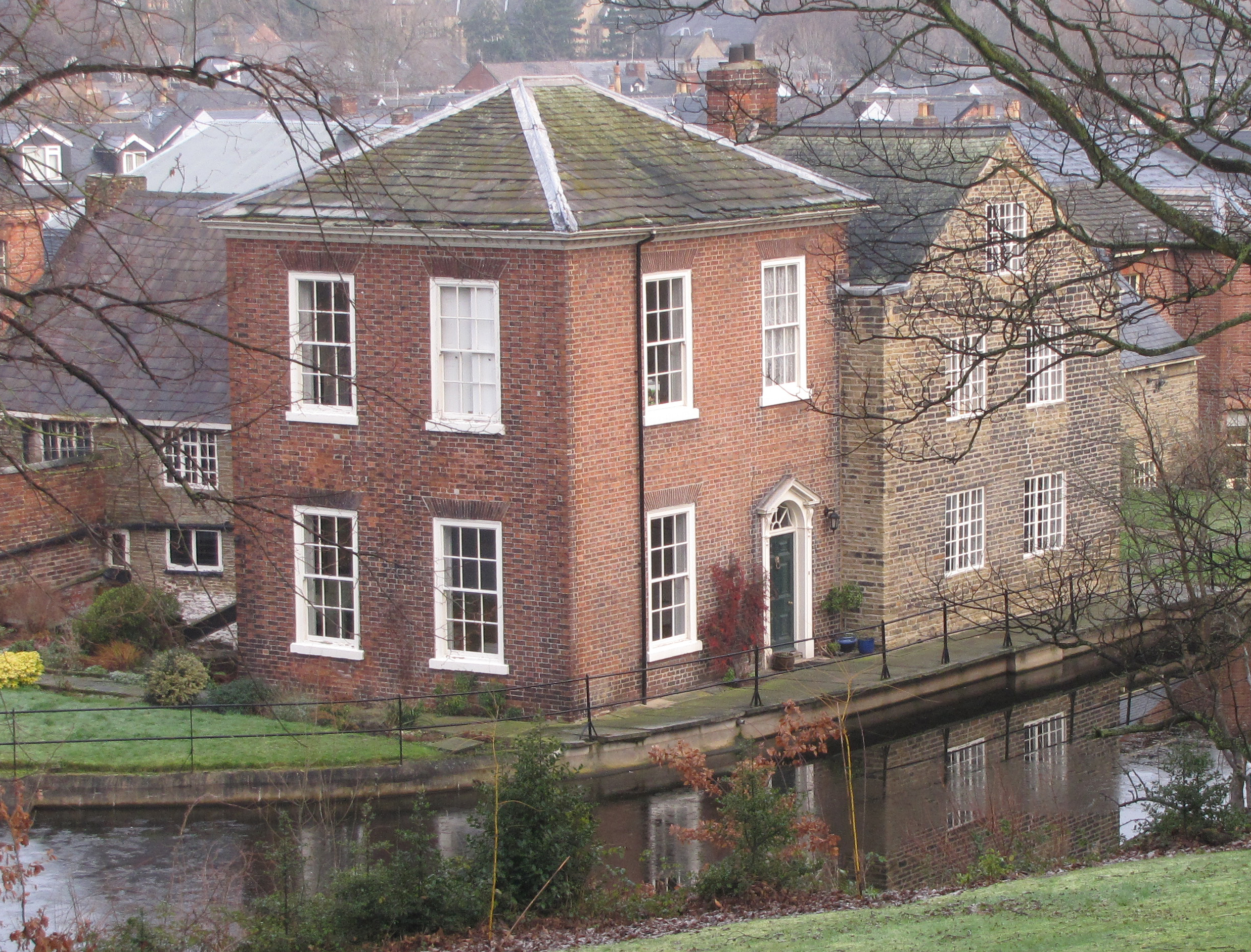
Sharrow Mills seen from Sharrow Vale Road.

Sharrow Mills are a collection of industrial buildings in Sheffield, England, which have been used for the production of snuff by the firm of Wilsons of Sharrow since the mid 18th century. The mills stands on the Porter Brook in the Sharrow Vale area of the city, just off Ecclesall Road.

== History ==
=== Early history ===
It is thought that a cutlers wheel, owned by the Duke of Norfolk existed on the site in 1581, with the tenant being Thomas Greenwood. Norfolk rental records mention "the wheel at Sharrow head" in paperwork dating from 1588 to 1589. The wheel was certainly in full operation by 1604 when the tenants were the Bamforth family, John Bamforth paid the rent until 1654 and succeeding members of his family continued as tenants until 1718, during this time the site was also known as Bamforth Wheel and Sharrow Moor Wheel. John Hale, who was a relative of the Bamforths, became tenant in 1719 and he was followed by a number of occupants including John Hall in 1731, before Thomas Wilson started renting the mill in 1737.

=== The Wilsons ===
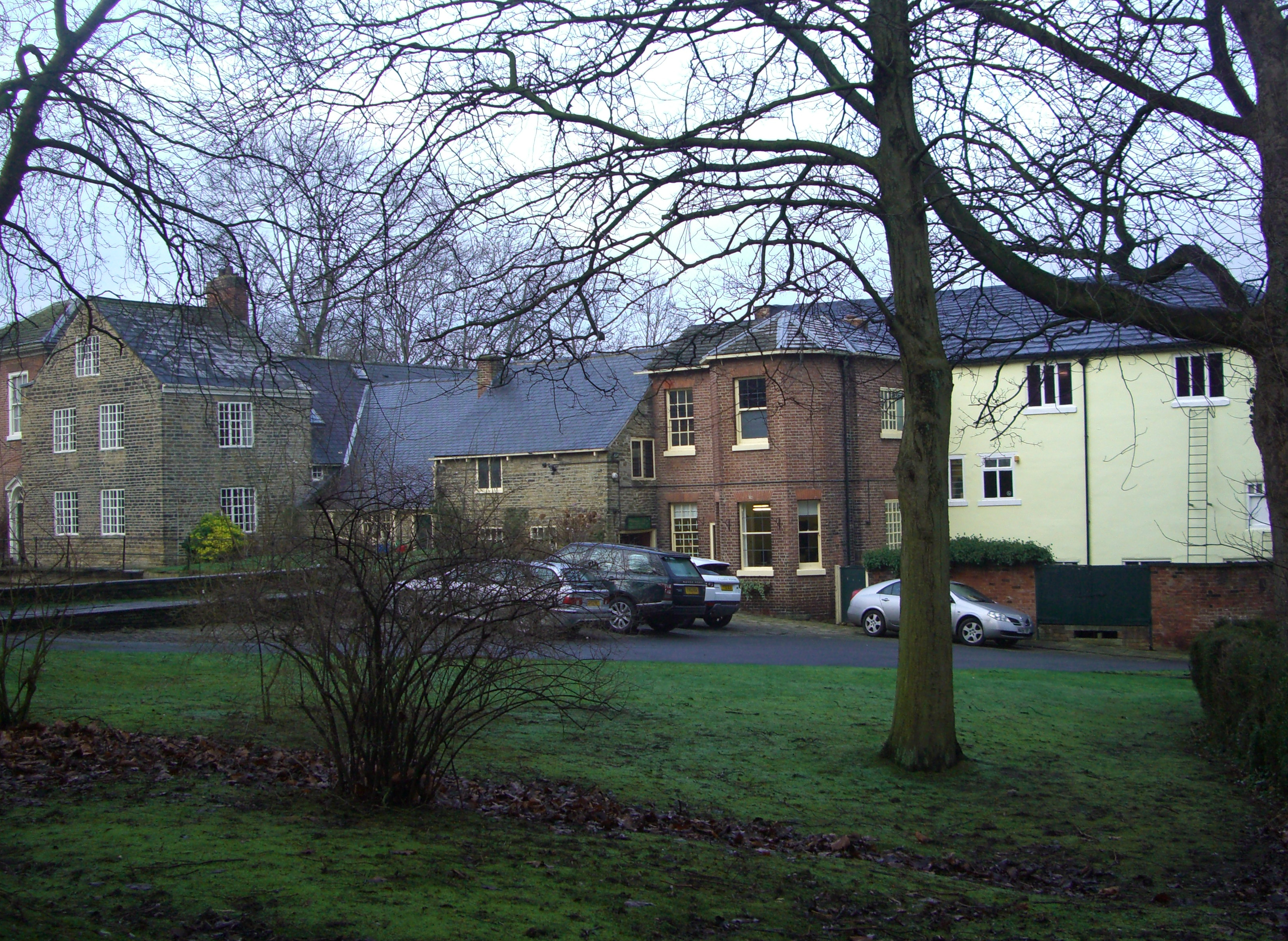
The buildings seen from Frog Walk.

Thomas Wilson was a manufacturer of blade shears who was a notable individual within Sheffield industry who had been Master Cutler in 1731. He was succeeded by his son Joseph in the mid-1740s. Joseph Wilson was a highly successful entrepreneur who broadened the business, introducing the production of Sheffield plate through his acquaintance with Thomas Boulsover as well as saw making. He also had an interest and some knowledge in snuff making, this may have been brought on by the manufacture of snuff boxes from Sheffield plate, and at some time in the 1740s the manufacture of snuff began at the mill along with the other activities. In February 1757 a series of extensions and alterations were undertaken by Joseph Wilson, even though he was still only the tenant. He paid the Duke of Norfolk to widen and improve the leats, giving the mill a unique tail goit system which crossed under the meandering Porter Brook in a culvert.

On 20 January 1763 a fire destroyed large areas of the mill and a national collection was organised to compensate Joseph Wilson because his business was so important to tax revenue. The building was reconstructed as a purpose-built snuff mill with drawings from 1764 showing the mill much larger than previously with no sign of the cutlers wheel. The brick built managers house was added at this time. In 1774 the building was rated as a snuff mill only. By 1794 the mill had a 21-foot fall of water with Joseph, Thomas and William Wilson named as the tenants of Sharrow Moor snuff mill “heretofore a cutlers grinding wheel”. Steam power was introduced in 1797 with a sketch plan of 1803 showing a chimney for the steam engine. In 1798 the Wilsons purchased the mill outright from the Duke of Norfolk's estate. Detailed valuation records from the first half of the 19th century itemise an overshot water wheel developing 10.25 HP, steam engine, drying house, warehouses and packing rooms.

=== The mill today ===
Today the mill is still capable of producing snuff by water power although electricity is often used to drive the machinery. A new snuff mill was built in 1880 to complement the existing one and this is arranged around a courtyard with various other 19th century buildings, including the counting house, warehouse and stable block. The mill dam is fed through a culvert from a weir on the Porter Brook. The water wheel is 19 feet in diameter and four foot 10 inches wide, the wheel powers the snuff grinding mills through a vertical main shaft which are situated two floors above.

== Listed building status ==
There are seven listed structures within the Sharrow Mills complex, the original 1763 snuff mill is listed as Grade II*. Grade II listed structures include the 1880 snuff mill, two bridges, stables, workshops and the dam walls of the mill pond.

== See also ==
- Carrow Snuff Mill, a former wind powered snuff mill in Norwich, Norfolk.
