= Whirlow =

Suburb of Sheffield, South Yorkshire, England

Coordinates: 53.343°N 1.527°W

- Suburb
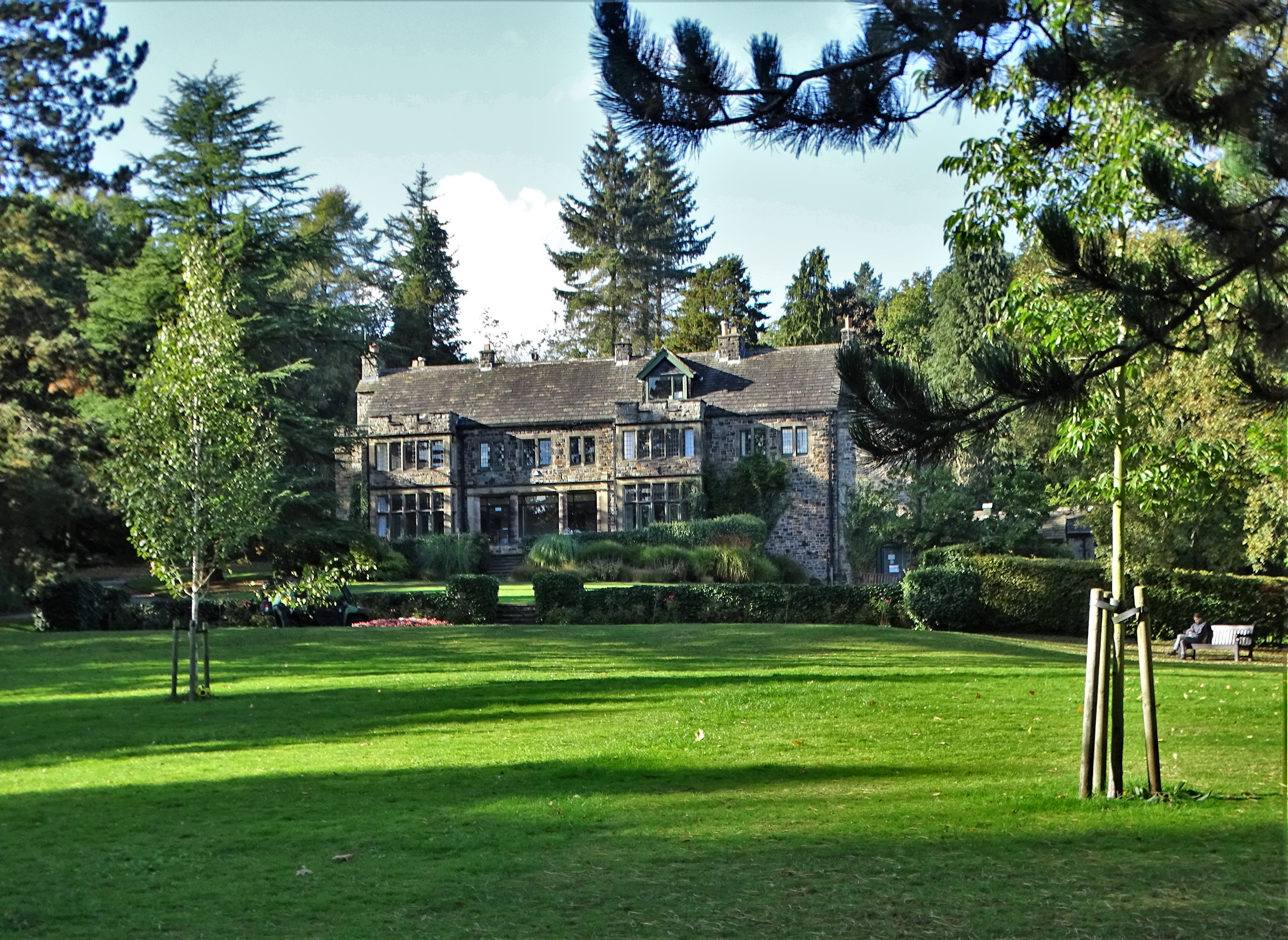
- Whirlowbrook Hall

- Location within South Yorkshire
- Metropolitan borough: Sheffield
- Metropolitan county: South Yorkshire
- Region: Yorkshire and the Humber
- Country: England
- Sovereign state: United Kingdom
- Post town: SHEFFIELD
- Postcode district: S11
- Dialling code: 0114
- Police: South Yorkshire
- Fire: South Yorkshire
- Ambulance: Yorkshire
- UK Parliament: Sheffield Hallam

Whirlow is a suburb of the City of Sheffield in England, it lies 3.7 miles (6 km) south-west of the city centre. The suburb falls within the Dore and Totley ward of the City. It is one of the most affluent areas of Sheffield, with much high class housing and several notable small country houses within it. During the Victorian era it was home to some of Sheffield's most influential citizens. Whirlow straddles the A625 (Ecclesall Road South), the main Sheffield to Hathersage road. The suburb covers the area from Parkhead in the north to Whirlow Bridge in the south and from Ecclesall Woods in the east to Broad Elms Lane in the west. Whirlow had a population of 1,663 in 2011.

== Etymology ==
The name Whirlow means “Boundary Mound”, it is a very appropriate, as the nearby Limb Brook which rises on the moors around Ringinglow and flows south-east through Whirlow on its way to join the River Sheaf at Abbeydale was formerly an important boundary marker. The brook separated the ancient kingdoms of Mercia and Northumbria as well as the ecclesiastical provinces of Canterbury and York and latterly the counties of Yorkshire and Derbyshire. Whirlow has had many spelling variations over the centuries including Horlow, Hurlowe, Horlowe, Horloo, Whirlowe, Whirlawe and Whirley.

== History ==
The use of the suffix “Low” in a place name often means a tumulus. Although no burial remains have been found at Whirlow there is a strong possibility that there was a burial mound in the vicinity which indicates the presence of the Tumulus culture of the Middle Bronze Age people. In 2011 excavations revealed remains of a substantial 1st or 2nd century AD Roman rural estate centre, or ‘villa’ on what is believed to be a pre-existing Brigantian farmstead at Whirlow Hall Farm. The excavations also revealed pieces of Mesolithic chipped flint which included a microlith, scraper and retouched blade. In the years following the Norman conquest of England, the hamlet of Whirlow was part of the manor of Ecclesall. The name of the Parkhead district is a reminder that the area was a medieval deer park which stretched down the hill to the River Sheaf. In the 16th century the park was changed into a coppice wood, the same size and shape as the present day Ecclesall Woods. The first documented mention of Whirlow came in a grant of land of 1296 in "le Horlowe" in "le parke de Ekilsale (Ecclesall)" between Robert son of Ralph de Ekilsale to Richard son of William son of Cescile de Ekilsale.

The early cottages in the area were simple timber framed buildings, possibly cruck-built with wattle and daub walls, by the 17th century the walls would be infilled with stone. The 1650s saw Whirlow caught up in the building boom which followed the end of the English Civil War. Many of the existing timber buildings were rebuilt in stone which was readily available from the nearby Brincliffe Edge quarries which had been producing stone since 1575. Whirlow remained a very rural area until the middle of the 19th century, however the passing of the Turnpike Act of May 1811 which authorised a new road from Banner Cross to Fox House near Hathersage signalled a new era for Whirlow. From 1840 large houses started to be built along the new turnpike road as the new prosperity of the industrial town of Sheffield made it desirable for its wealthier citizens to leave their house in the centre of the town and move to the pleasanter western outskirts. After the First World War increasing amounts of land were released for development and new roads were created to accommodate the housing. After the Second World War the reduction in agriculture saw many of the farms and workers cottages purchased to be restored and used as private dwellings.

== Significant buildings ==
Whirlow has a high proportion of large impressive houses, many of these were built by Sheffield's Nouveau riche in the Victorian era. They had acquired their wealth as Sheffield became a wealthy city as a result of its industrial development.

Parkhead Hall a Grade II listed building was built in 1865 by the architect J.B. Mitchell-Withers for his own use, the steel magnate Sir Robert Hadfield lived there between 1898 and 1939. Whirlow Hall Farm stands on the site of the old Whirlow Hall, the seat of the Brights, an ancient Whirlow family who lived in the area as early as the 14th century. The present building dates from 1843 and is the site of the Whirlow Hall Farm Trust, a working farm and registered charity which allows inner city children to experience farm life.

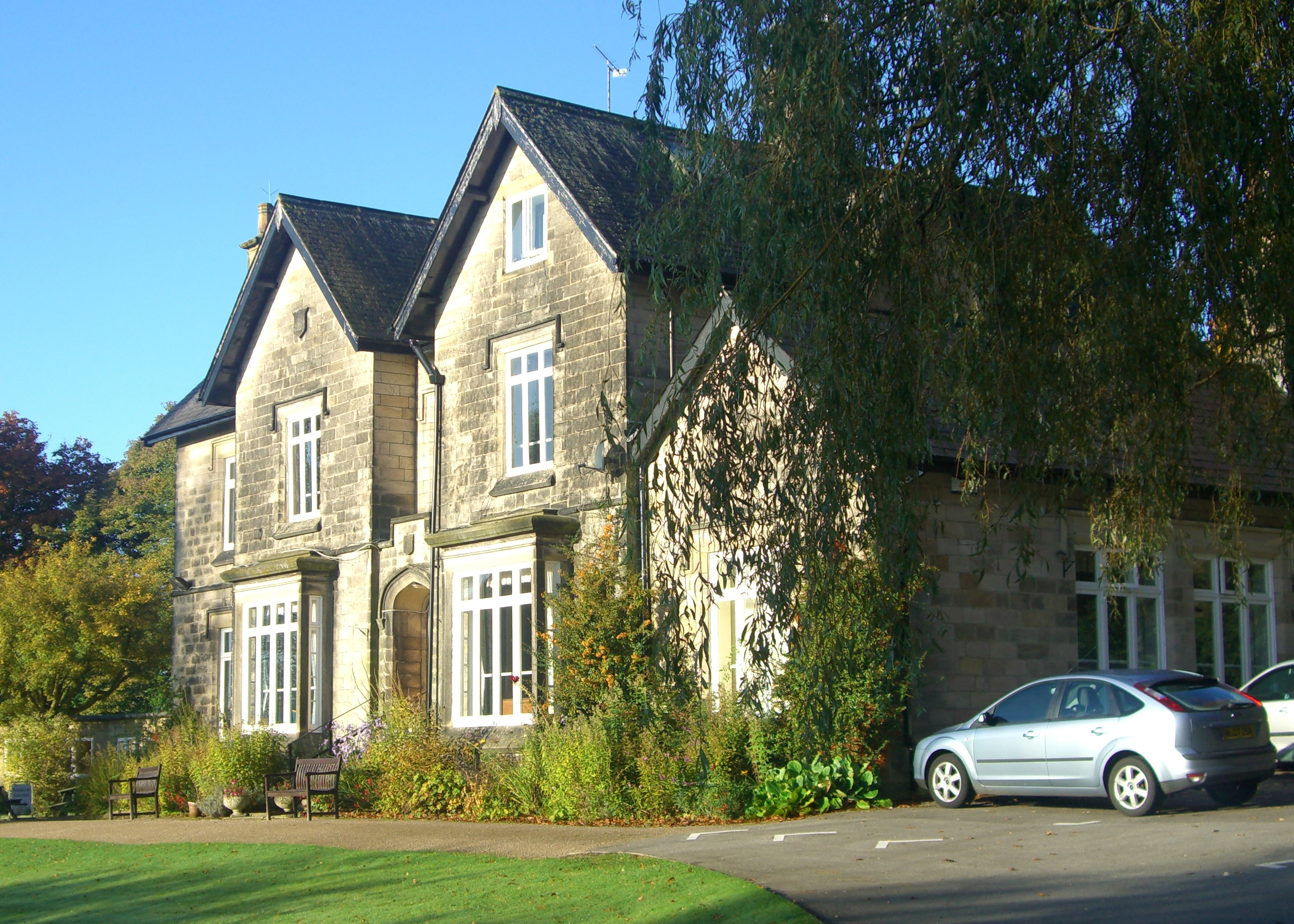
Whirlow Grange.

=== Whirlow Grange ===
The first of the large houses to be built on the new road in Whirlow in 1840. Built by the architect William Flockton for Henry Waterfall, an attorney, it was originally called Whirlow Cottage until a name change in 1873. A ballroom was added in 1898 as was the fashion of that time. It became the Sheffield Diocesan Conference Centre in 1953 and today trading as Whirlow Grange Limited it hosts conferences, weddings and courses. Now demolished (2018) and rebuilt as a block of 9 flats

=== Whirlow Court ===
James Fawcett, joint owner of the Sheffield silversmiths James Dixon & Sons built Whirlow Court, a small country house in the early 1880s. It originally had substantial grounds covering many acres, over the years the land has been sold off, with the housing on Whirlow Court Road, Whirlowdale Close, Whirlowdale Rise and Whirlow Grove all built on land which was originally part of the estate. Frederick Wild, magistrate and a businessman who had been Master Cutler in 1898/99, lived at the house between 1915 and 1920. Arthur Davy, the prominent Sheffield grocer lived at Whirlow Court between 1920 and 1946 and was followed by Maurice Batchelor, Chairman of Batchelors peas, who lived there up to 1954. In 1956 Whirlow Court was bought by Sheffield City Council, serving as the official residence of the Lord Mayor of Sheffield and visiting High Court Judges. In 1981 it was taken over by The Lord Chancellor's Department and is now used as lodgings for visiting judges. It is Grade II listed.

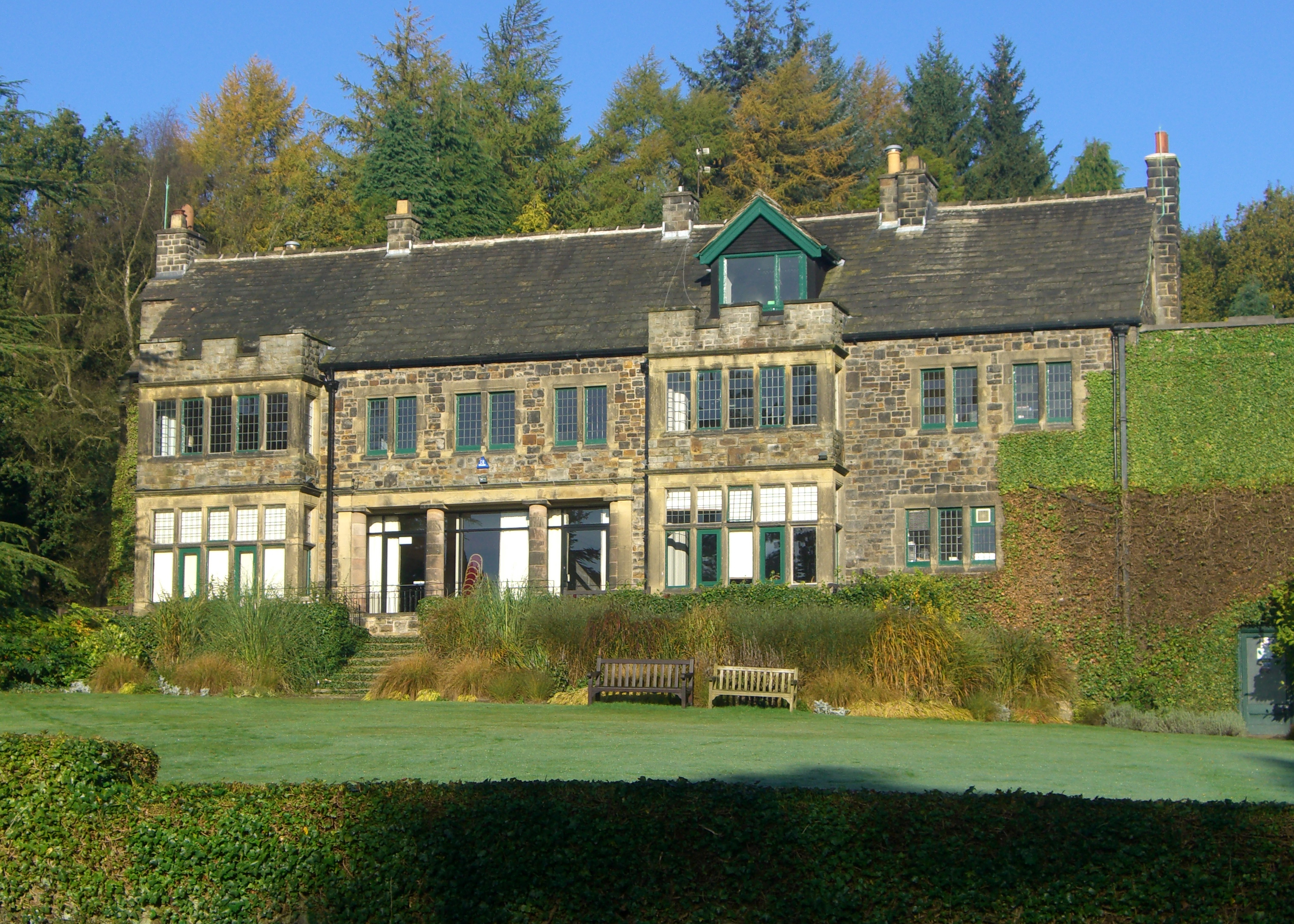
Whirlow Brook Hall.

=== Whirlow Brook Hall ===
Built by Percy Fawcett in 1906, he had moved from Middlewood Hall to be close to his brother who had inherited Whirlow Court. The house is stone built with long windows and is set on an elevated terrace which gives fine views over Ecclesall Woods to Abbeydale. In 1920 the house came into the possession of Walter Benton Jones and his wife Madge, they were keen gardeners and along with six staff developed the grounds to a very high standard. After Madge's death in 1938 the house along with 39 acres of grounds was sold to a consortium which included the Town Trustees, the Graves Charitable Trust and Sheffield Corporation for £15,000. The grounds were opened to the public in 1951 as Whirlow Brook Park, the house is now a venue for weddings, conferences and events, for many years there was a café for visitors within the house but this closed in October 2012.

=== Other historic buildings ===
Hollis Hospital is a Grade II listed building situated at the end of a long drive off Ecclesall Road South near Whirlow Bridge. It was constructed In 1903. The hospital was formerly situated in the centre of Sheffield near Snig Hill and moved to Whirlow when the land was needed for redevelopment. Whirlow House is a large modern building dating from 1993, the previous building on the site also known as Whirlow House was built by the solicitor Frederick Wilson in 1841. The house subsequently had three owners connected with the Sheffield steel industry, these being Henry Furniss, Bernard Firth and Edgar Allan. It was demolished 1977 and replaced with the current building.

Broomcroft was built by the architect J.B. Mitchell-Withers in 1883 for David Davy, owner of the Davy steelworks in Sheffield. After Davy's death in 1923 it was sold and remained a private residence until it was given to the City of Sheffield in 1953 by George Jowett. Broomcroft then became a council run nursing home and in April 1989 it was sold for £1.4 million to the private healthcare company Bupa who have carried out extensive renovations and continue to run it as an 87-bed unit for the elderly. Clifford House was built in 1894 for the colliery owner Denys Hague. From 1915 the house was lived in by Charles Clifford chairman of the Telegraph and Star newspaper who would later become the main benefactor of the Charles Clifford Dental Hospital in central Sheffield.

== Amenities ==
Whirlow is a suburb with very few amenities, it tends to use the facilities based in adjacent suburbs. It has no retail shops, schools, churches or GP surgeries within its boundaries. The nearest shops being at Parkhead crossroads. The closest GP practice is the Bents Green Surgery. All Saints Church, Ecclesall is the local parish church, just over two km away. The only public house in Whirlow is the Rising Sun on Abbey Lane, it began as a small cottage and has been altered and enlarged many times over the years, it was first recorded as a public house at the end of the 18th century when Sampson Brookshaw was the innkeeper. The nearest schools are the Dobcroft Junior and Infant school at Millhouses and Silverdale Secondary School at Bents Green, Silverdale was completely rebuilt and modernised in 2009.

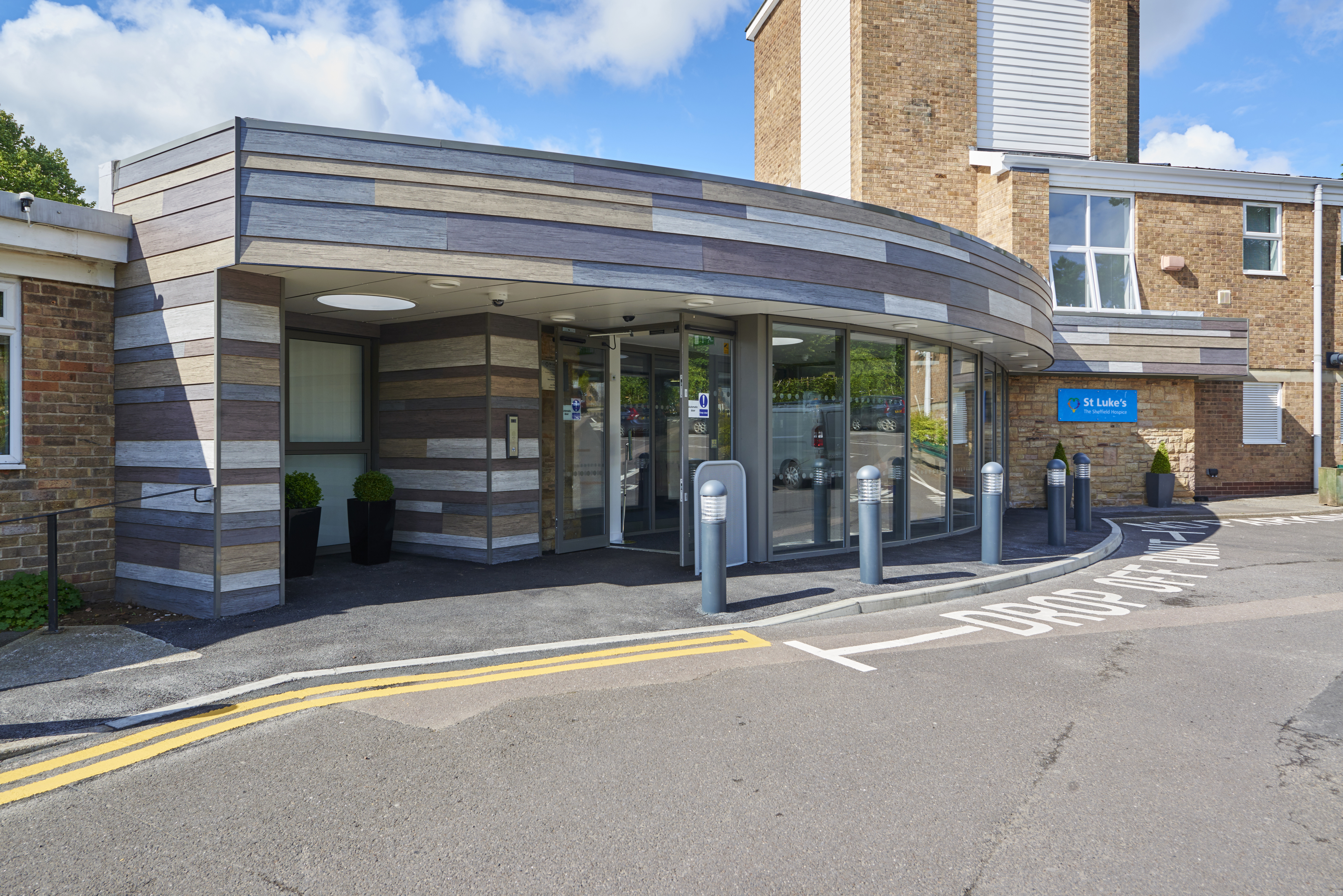
St Luke's Hospice.

St Luke's Hospice is located on Little Common Lane and cares for people aged 18 and above from across Sheffield who have incurable illnesses. It was opened in October 1971 on land donated by British Steel Corporation who at that time owned the adjacent Clifford House. The hospice is a registered charity and only receives 25% of its funding from the NHS, raising over £7 million annually through charity to continue its work.

Whirlow has two parks, the already mentioned Whirlow Brook Park is classed as a district park and is looked after by the council. Whinfell Quarry Garden was originally the garden to Whinfell, a house built for the industrialist Samuel Doncaster in 1897 and gutted by fire in June 1971. The gardens were designed as a series of winding walks with ponds and waterfalls and were given to the City of Sheffield in 1968 by the Neill family as a memorial to Sir Frederick Neill (1891-1967) industrial entrepreneur and Master Cutler in 1937.

== Statistics ==
Statistics show Whirlow as a wealthy, well educated area with low unemployment. Over 92% of residents own their own homes compared to the Sheffield average of 60%. Over 60% of the houses are detached compared to the city average of 14%. Only 1.7% of the population is claiming housing benefit compared to the city average of almost 18% and the Whirlow area is ranked as a least deprived area in the deprivation indicator. The suburb has an unemployment rate of 1% while almost 43% of the population are educated to degree standard compared to the Sheffield average of 19%.
