= Wilsons of Sharrow =

Coordinates: 53°22′06″N 1°29′34″W

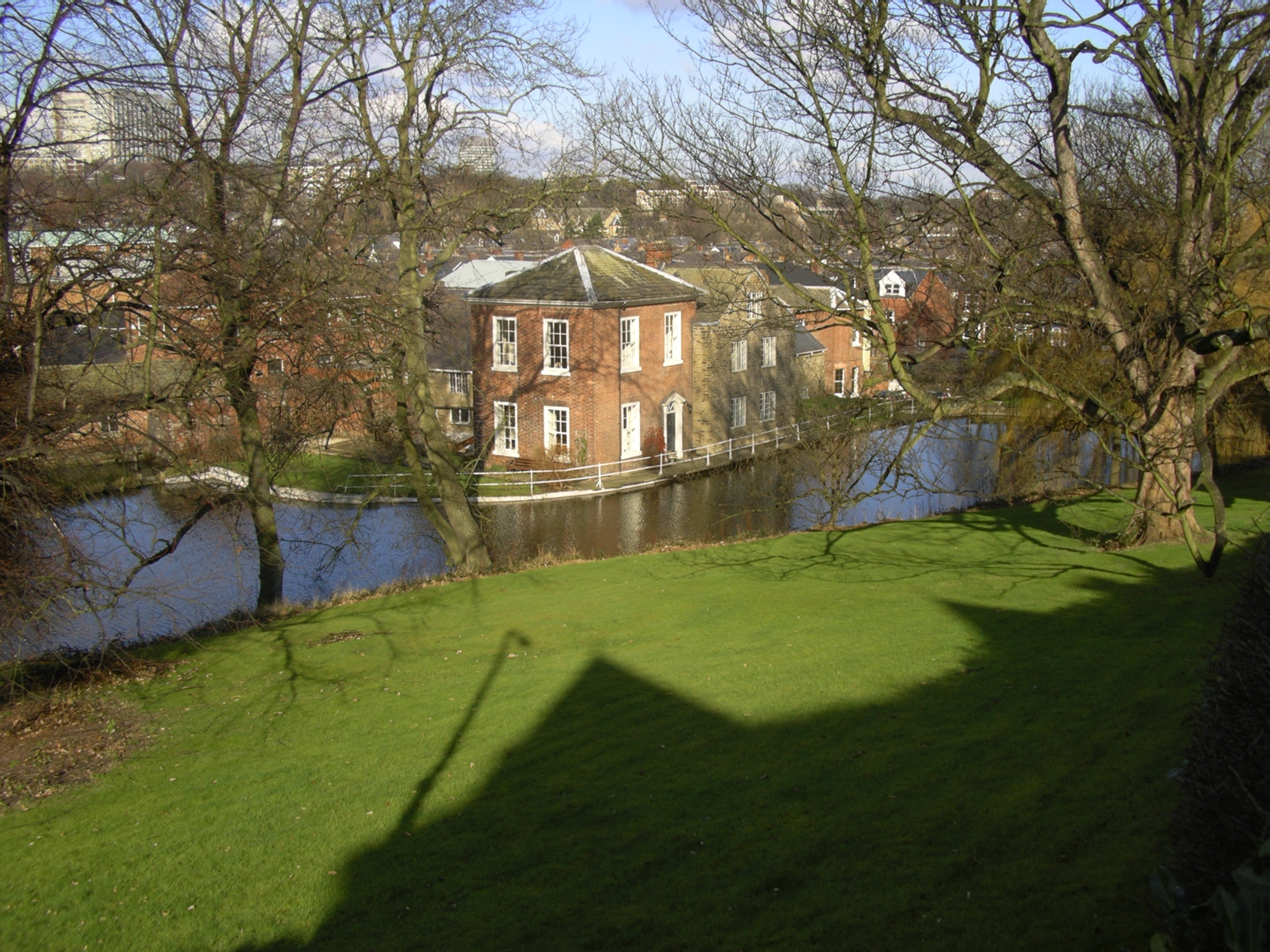
Sharrow Mills.

Wilsons of Sharrow, now named Wilsons & Company (Sharrow) Ltd, based at Sharrow Mills in the Sharrow district of Sheffield, United Kingdom, is a manufacturer of snuff tobacco since 1737. Since 1982 Wilsons now also manufactures the renowned Fribourg & Treyer snuff blends who were producing snuff since 1720.

In the early 1740s, Joseph Wilson succeeded his father Thomas Wilson, a shearsmith, and master cutler, as tenant of Sharrow Mills (then a cutlers wheel). The mill suffered a fire in 1746, when his stock in trade included "tobacco snuff".

In 1833, Joseph and Henry Wilson parted company with their cousins William and George (who retained Sharrow Mills), setting up a rival business at Westbrook Mill nearby on Sharrowvale Road. That remained a family business incorporated as Joseph and Henry Wilson Ltd in 1895. It remained in family ownership until 1953, when its elderly proprietors sold the business to Imperial Tobacco. Its archives are now deposited in the Sheffield Archives.

At Sharrow Mills steam power was introduced in 1897, but the water wheel remains operational. The company is currently still owned by the Wilson family, the sixth generation since Thomas, still based at Sharrow Mills, in Sheffield.
