= Whinfell Quarry Garden =

Ornamental quarry garden

Coordinates: 53°20′26″N 01°32′04″W

Whinfell Quarry Garden is an early 20th century ornamental garden in Whirlow, Sheffield, built in an old quarry, containing rare trees and including a limestone rock garden designed by the horticulturist and plant collector Clarence Elliott.

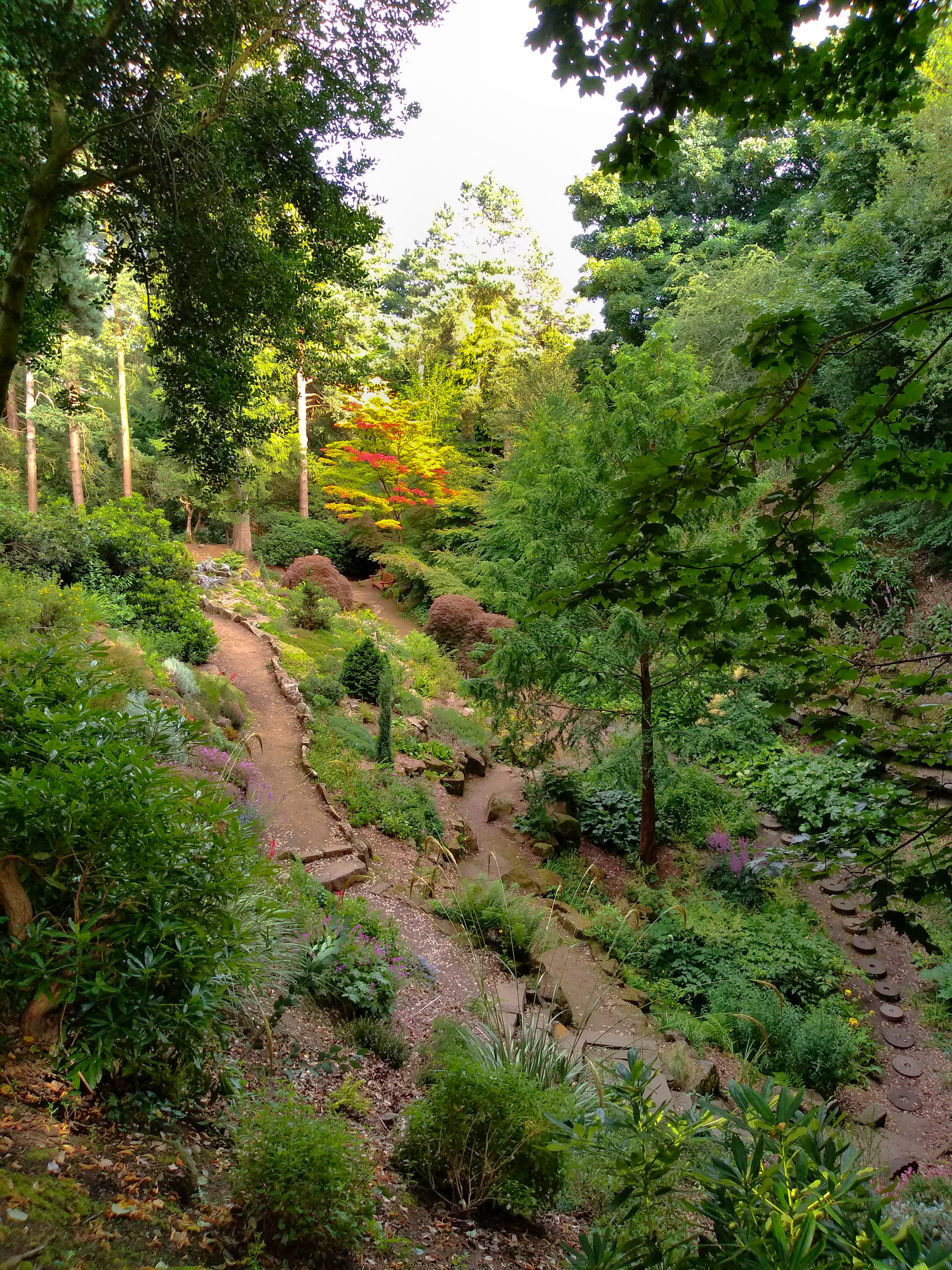
The Small Quarry

It is Grade II listed by English Heritage since 1999, List Entry Number:1001431, of about 1 hectares. It is next to Whirlow Brook Park and can be accessed from Ecclesall Road South.

== History ==
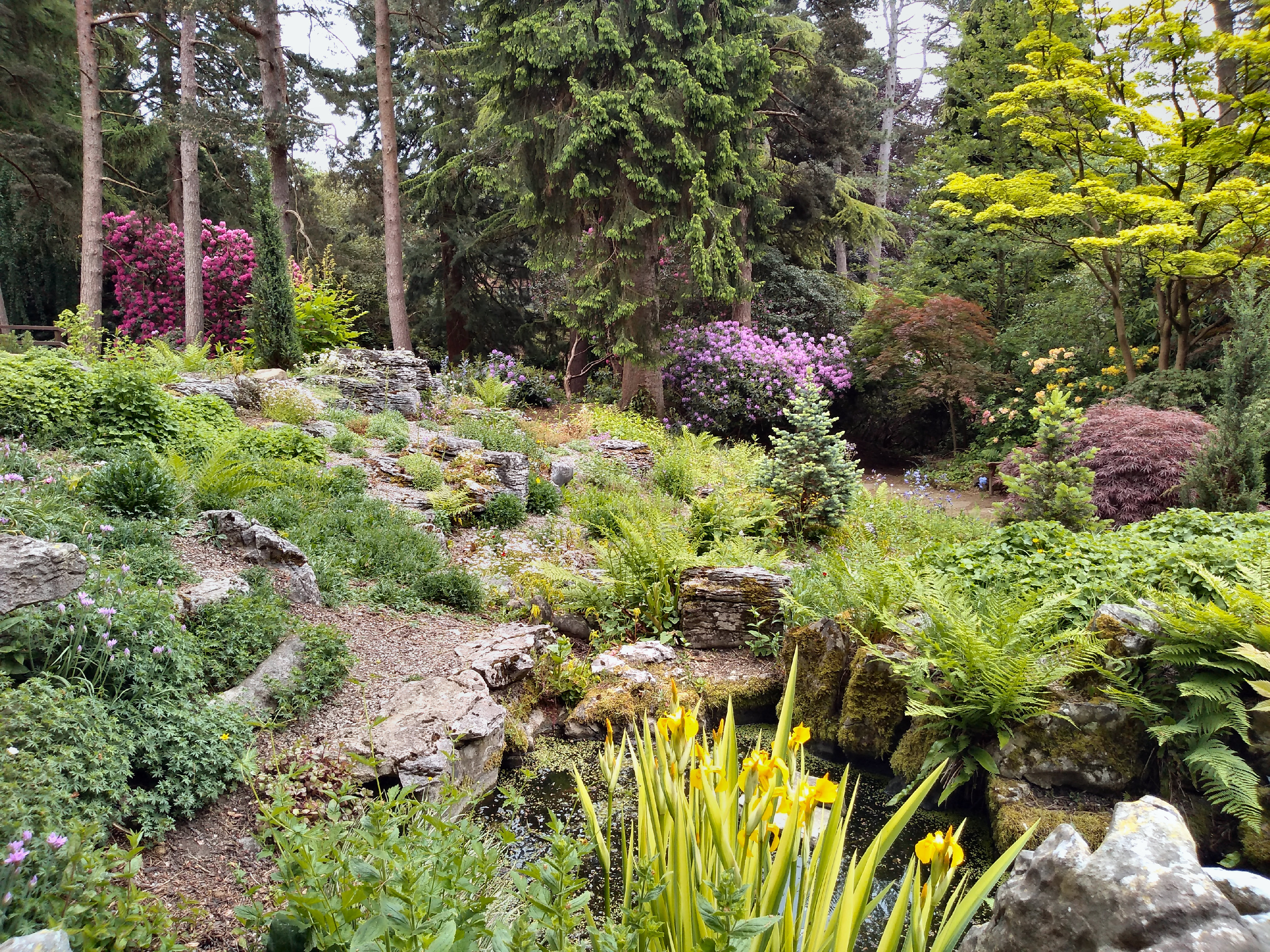

Until the 1880s the site was called Whirlow Quarry and used to quarry flagstones. The derelict quarries were converted into a garden in 1895 by the steel industrialist Samuel Doncaster (1853-1934) who leased the land from the Fitzwilliam Estate and it became the garden for his house, Whinfell House, erected in 1902, overlooking the garden. He created the sheltered garden by adding unusual trees and shrubs, including giant redwood trees, acers, bamboo and rhododendrons, and building ponds and waterfalls. The 'Small Quarry' was designed by Clarence Elliott (1881-1969) in 1912 as a limestone rock garden with a water cascade. The 'Large Quarry' was designed with a view point from the 'Top Seat' down to a series of pools.

On the death of Samuel Doncaster in 1934 Whinfell House was bought by Frederick Neill, the first High Sheriff of Hallamshire, who renovated the gardens. Whinfell House was destroyed by fire in 1971 and later demolished; Whinfell Court was then built at the top of the site. The garden was gifted to Sheffield in 1968 by the family company, James Neill Holdings, as a memorial to Neill, and is open to the public.

Since 2001 the Friends of Whinfell Quarry Garden help raise funds to maintain the garden. In 2016 the Heritage Lottery funded repairs to the Clarence Elliott cascade.
