= Sharrow =

District of Sheffield, England

Coordinates: 53.36716°N 1.48885°W

- Suburb
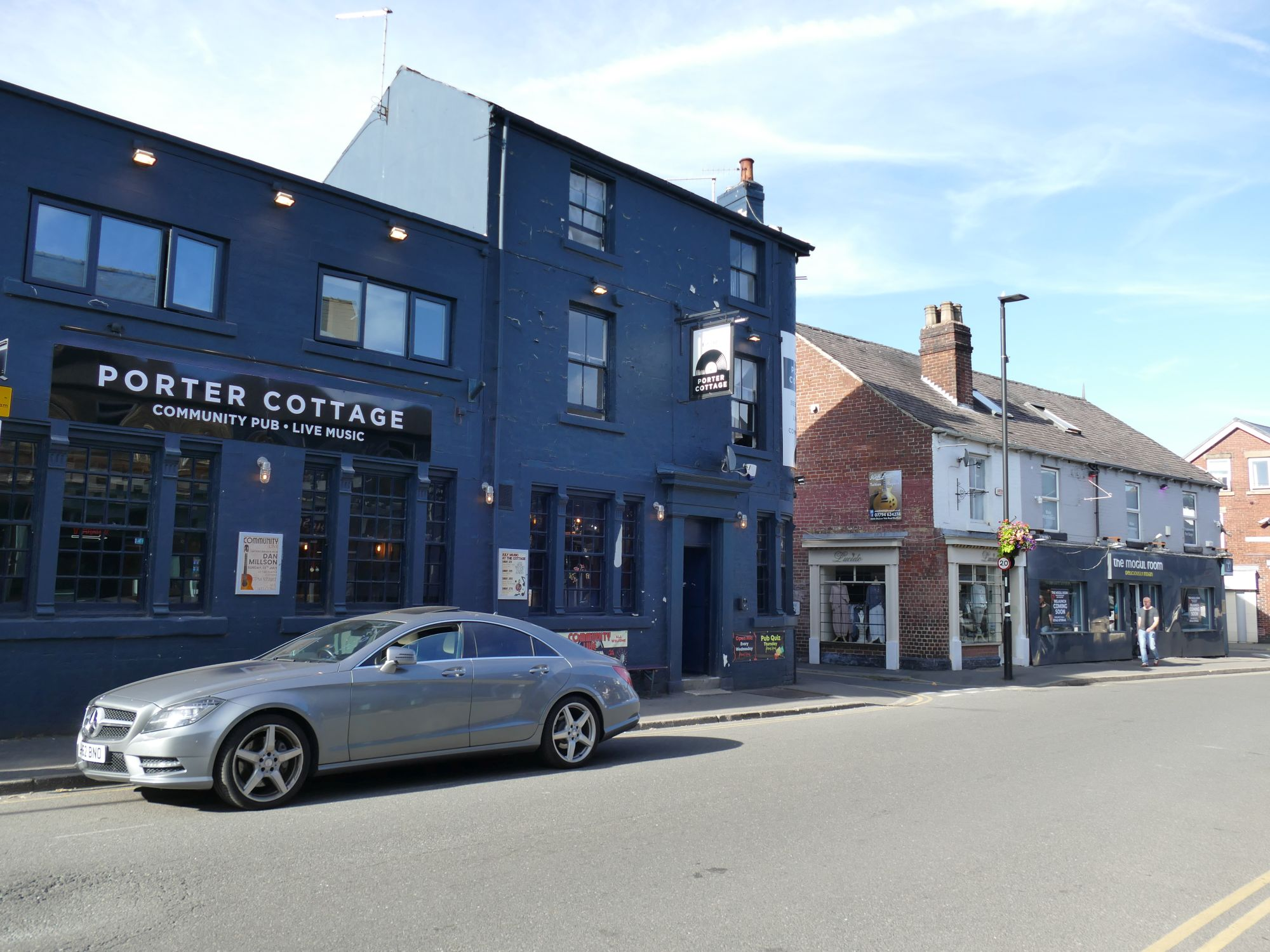
- Sharrow Vale Road

- Location within South Yorkshire
- Metropolitan borough: Sheffield
- Metropolitan county: South Yorkshire
- Region: Yorkshire and the Humber
- Country: England
- Sovereign state: United Kingdom
- Post town: Sheffield
- Postcode district: S2, S7, S11
- Dialling code: 0114
- Police: South Yorkshire
- Fire: South Yorkshire
- Ambulance: Yorkshire
- UK Parliament: Sheffield Central

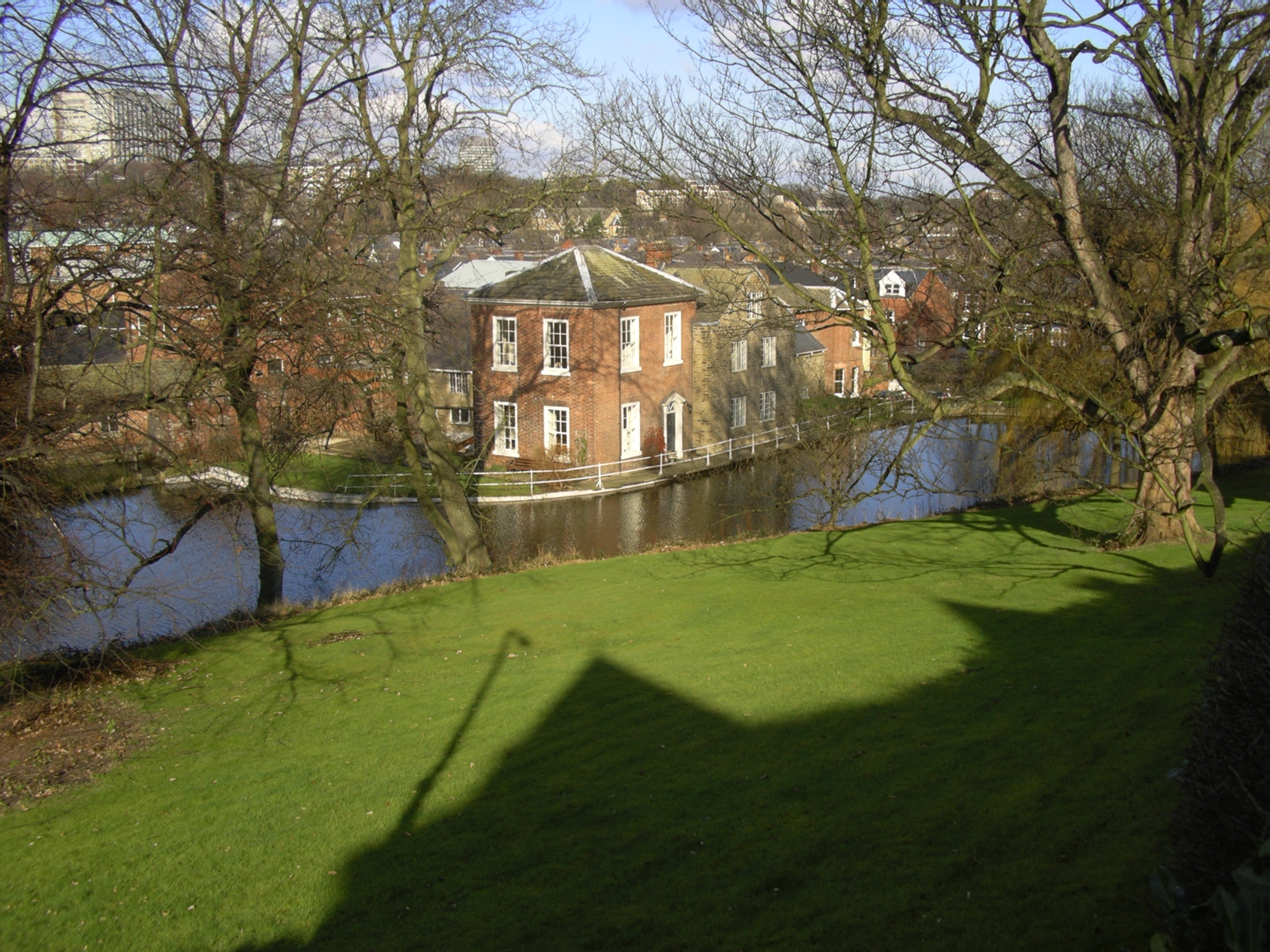
Sharrow Mills, a snuff factory on the Porter Brook.

Sharrow is a suburb of Sheffield located directly southwest of Sheffield city centre. The district lies within the Nether Edge and Sharrow ward of the city.

The inner city area of Sharrow situated around London Road is distinct from the more leafy suburbs of Sharrow Head, and Sharrow Vale.

Sharrow Ward's back to back terraced housing in Little Sheffield was redeveloped in the 1970s to provide modern, high density accommodation for the area's working class population.

With the economic resurgence of Sheffield in the late 1990s, Sharrow has benefited from considerable inward investment both in improved housing stock and through development of local initiatives such as the small business enterprise unit at Sheffield United F.C.'s Bramall Lane ground in nearby Highfield.

Until June 2004 Sharrow was also the name given to one of Sheffield's electoral wards which included Sharrow proper and a number of surrounding districts. This diverse ward contained 17,897 people in the 2001 UK Census subdivided as follows:

- White: 69.0%
- Asian: 16.3%
- Black: 7.5%
- Chinese or other: 4.2%
- Mixed: 3.0%

This diversity is celebrated by some with the Sharrow Festival, a multi-cultural, multi-arts event showcasing local talent and fostering a spirit of pride in the local community. The annual Sharrow Lantern Carnival is the other cultural highlight in the area, and is held in April.

== History ==
Sharrow was urbanized between 1830 and 1850 when Little Sheffield, a village and adjunct to the main town of Sheffield was redeveloped to cope with the rapidly increasing growth in population. Separated from Sheffield town by the "uninhabited, barren, gorse-covered, Sheffield Moor". Industry here was based on water-power provided by Porter Brook with water-wheels at Sharrow Mill (Sharrow Vale Road), Sharrow Forge (Napier Street), and Bennetts’ Wheel (Vulcan Works). The latter two mill-dams and Broomhall Cornmill dam off Ecclesall Road were drained and filled-in around 1870 providing land for houses, schools, and new industries.

The Parish Church of St Mary's, Bramall Lane, was built in 1826 with the help of a government grant to provide churches for "impoverished industrial workers". Originally a Chapel of Ease to Sheffield Cathedral standing in open fields, 22 years later, in 1848, St Mary's became a parish in its own right. Sharrow and St Mary's was part of Poor Law Union (PLU)/Reg. District of Ecclesall Bierlow.

In 1836 the General Cemetery was opened in Sharrow on the site of a former stone quarry. Lying between Cemetery Road, which runs from Sharrow Head to the bottom of The Moor, and Sharrow Brook.

Bramall Lane was named after the Bramall family, file and graver manufacturers. The Bramalls owned "The Old White House" on the corner of Bramall Lane and Cherry Street.
