= Hugh Neill =

British businessman, public servant and British Army officer

Sir James Hugh Neill KCVO CBE TD JP
- Born: James Hugh Neill; 29 March 1921; Sheffield, Yorkshire, England
- Died: 5 November 2017 (aged 96); Sheffield, Yorkshire, England
- Education: Rugby School
- Children: 3
- Military career
- Allegiance: United Kingdom
- Branch: Royal Engineers
- Service years: 1939-1946
- Rank: Lieutenant-colonel
- Units: Royal Bombay Sappers & Miners, 20th India Division
- Conflicts: Second World War
- Awards: Mentioned in dispatches

View historySir James Hugh Neill, KCVO, CBE, TD (29 March 1921 – 5 November 2017) was a British businessman, public servant, and British Army officer. Described as a "doyen of the Sheffield steel industry", he worked for his family's tool manufacturing firm, James Neill & Co, following leaving school, until retirement (1939 to 1989); he served as the firms chairman between 1963 and 1989, and then its honorary president. He served as Master Cutler for 1958.

Neill's only break in his business career was for service in the British Army during the Second World War: he was an officer in the Royal Engineers and had reached the rank of lieutenant colonel by end of the war. In addition to his business interests, he was a public servant. He served as High Sheriff of Hallamshire from 1972 to 1973, and as Lord Lieutenant of South Yorkshire from 1985 to 1996. In 1958, like his father and both his grandfathers, he was Master Cutler for the Company of Cutlers in Hallamshire.

== Early life and education ==
Neill was born on 29 March 1921 in Sheffield, Yorkshire, England. He was the eldest son of Colonel Sir Frederick Neill and his wife Winifred Margaret Neill (née Colver). He was educated at Rugby School, then an all-boys public school in Rugby, Warwickshire. He was a member of the Junior Division of the Officers Training Corps at his school, and reached the rank of cadet serjeant. He had planned to attend the University of Cambridge, but did not matriculate due to the outbreak of the Second World War.

== Career ==
=== Military service ===
On 21 June 1939, Neill was commissioned into the Royal Engineers, Territorial Army (TA), as a second lieutenant. As a member of the TA, he was not a full-time soldier and was part of the reserve forces. With the outbreak of the Second World War, he was called up for full-time service. During the war, he served at home in the United Kingdom and abroad in Norway, India, Burma and Germany. Having held the war substantive rank of captain, he was promoted to lieutenant colonel January 1946: this promotion was back dated to 11 April 1945.

On 17 October 1988, Neill was appointed Honorary Colonel of the 4th Battalion Yorkshire Volunteers, Territorial Army. He stepped down from this post in October 1993, and was allowed to retain the honorary rank of colonel.

=== Public service ===
On 22 March 1972, Neill was appointed by the Privy Council as High Sheriff of Hallamshire; this post is held for one year and is a ceremonial appointment linked to the judiciary. On 8 January 1974, he was commissioned as Deputy Lieutenant (DL) of the Lord Lieutenant of the West Riding of Yorkshire. On 7 May 1985, Queen Elizabeth II appointed him as Lord Lieutenant of South Yorkshire, the monarch's personal representative in county.

== Honours ==
In 1946, Neill was Mentioned in Dispatches "in recognition of gallant and distinguished services in Burma". In 1950, he was awarded the Efficiency Decoration (TD) in recognition of long service in the reserves.

In the 1969 Queen's Birthday Honours, Neill was appointed a Commander of the Order of the British Empire (CBE) "for services to export". In January 1986, he was appointed a Knight of the Venerable Order of St John (KStJ). In the 1996 Queen's Birthday Honours, he was appointed a Knight Commander of the Royal Victorian Order (KCVO) in recognition of his service as Lord Lieutenant of South Yorkshire, and therefore granted the title sir.

== Personal life ==
Neill married his first wife, Jane Shuttleworth, a kennel huntswoman of the Poona and Kirkee Hounds, in 1943 and had two daughters, Jill and Sue, who survive him. He is also survived by his second wife, Anne (née O’Leary), whom he married in 1982, and their son, Michael. He has two grand-daughters(Anna Lee and Nicola Baguley), two grandsons and three great-grandchildren(Callum Lee, Jake Lee and Lucy Baguley).

He was a keen golfer and was past captain and president of Lindrick Golf Club, between Sheffield and Worksop. He served on numerous committees of the Royal and Ancient Golf Club of St. Andrews, the sport’s ruling body, and was its captain in 1981. He lived on the edge of Lindrick for six decades.

In the equestrian world, he was a member of the Council of the British Horse Society and received the society’s Award of Merit in 1988.

He ran four family-run grant-making charities for over fifty years and supported numerous other charities across the county of South Yorkshire, including being a founding trustee of the South Yorkshire Community Foundation.
