= Pamela Liversidge =

Pamela Liversidge OBE, FREng
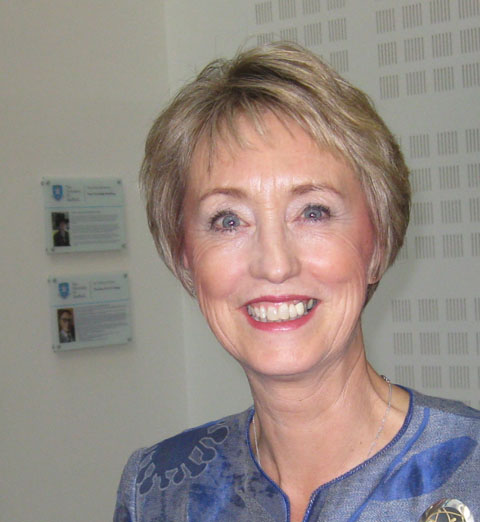
- Pamela Liversidge, at the opening of the Pam Liversidge Building, Faculty of Engineering, University of Sheffield
- Born: Pamela Humphries; 23 December 1949 (age 76)
- Education: BSc Mechanical Engineering, Aston University
- Engineering career
- Discipline: Mechanical Engineering
- Institutions: IMechE, Association of Institutions in Medical Engineering

Pamela Edwards Liversidge OBE FREng (born 23 December 1949) was the first female president of the Institution of Mechanical Engineers.

== Life ==
She was born 23 December 1949 (née Humphries) and graduated with a BSc in Mechanical Engineering from Aston University. After graduating she worked for GKN as a Graduate Trainee, then moved into forging with a small company based in Sheffield. Following this she moved into the electricity supply industry, becoming Divisional Director of East Midlands Electricity.

In 1993 she set up her own business to manufacture specialist metal powders, notably for medical engineering through which she facilitated the formation of the Association of Institutions in Medical Engineering (AIME). Her company was sold in 1996, and Liversidge became the managing director of Quest Investments, a holding company for several engineering enterprises.

== Honours ==
In 1997 she became the first female president of the Institution of Mechanical Engineers, and in 1999 was awarded the OBE in recognition of her services to engineering. She has received honorary degrees from Aston, Huddersfield and Sheffield Hallam Universities. She was High Sheriff of South Yorkshire in 2004–5.

She is a Fellow of the Royal Academy of Engineering, Fellow of the City and Guilds Institute, Freeman of the Company of Cutlers in Hallamshire, and Liveryman of the Worshipful Company of Engineers.

Her husband Douglas was elected as Master of the Company of Cutlers in Hallamshire in 1998, leading to Liversidge to hold the Mistress Cutler role. From 2011 to 2012 she was Master Cutler of the Company of Cutlers in Hallamshire, the first woman to hold this post.

On 7 February 2014 a new postgraduate engineering building at the University of Sheffield was named the Pam Liversidge Building in her honour. Since 2019 the Pam Liversidge OBE Award for Engineering is awarded at the Inspirational Women of Sheffield Awards.

Professional and academic associations
Preceded by Robert William Ernest Shannon	President of the Institution of Mechanical Engineers; 1997	Succeeded by John Spence
