= Sheriff of Hallamshire =

Ceremonial officer of Hallamshire, England

The Sheriff of Hallamshire was a shrievalty title which was in existence from 1962 until 1974 in Yorkshire, United Kingdom.

== Creation ==
The shrievalty was created on 30 April 1962 under the terms of the Criminal Justice Administration Act 1962. Section 3 of the act provided that for:

... the purposes of the law relating to sheriffs, the Sheffield Division of the county of York ... shall on the appointed day cease to be part of the county of York and become a separate county by the name of Hallamshire

The creation of a distinct county for judicial purposes in the south of Yorkshire originated in the 1961 report of the Streatfeild Committee, which made various recommendations on the operation of the criminal courts in England and Wales. The need for the creation of a new jurisdiction arose from the long waiting times for cases to come to trial in the North Eastern Circuit, which were far in excess of the maximum recommended waiting period of two months. In order to deliver timely justice, the committee felt that it was necessary for assizes to be held at Leeds and Sheffield simultaneously. As the Sheriff of Yorkshire was required to preside at all assizes in the county, it followed that a new shrievalty and county would need to be formed.

During the parliamentary debate on the bill, Lord Rea sought to rename the proposed judicial county as simply "Hallam" (or alternatively as the "South Riding"). He felt that the use of the suffix "shire" was misleading as:

"... it would look as if we had added a new geographical county to the United Kingdom. For a foreign visitor, it would be a geographical and typographical confusion.".

The Lord Chancellor, Viscount Kilmuir, explained that "Hallamshire" was the correct term for the area surrounding Sheffield, that the suffix "shire" was widely used in the north of England for subdivisions of counties, and that it was particularly appropriate as its original meaning was the area under the jurisdiction of a sheriff. Lord Rea conceded and withdrew his amendment.

The first official action of the new Sheriff was the opening of the Sheffield Assizes on 29 May 1962. The occasion was seen as being historic, with the Recorder of Sheffield noting that it was the first new shrievalty to have been created for many centuries.

== Area of jurisdiction ==
"Hallamshire" was defined by the 1962 legislation as the following local government areas as they existed at the time:

- The county boroughs of Barnsley, Doncaster, Rotherham and Sheffield.
- The urban districts of Adwick le Street, Bentley with Arksey, Conisbrough, Cudworth, Darfield, Darton, Dearne, Dodworth, Hoyland Nether, Maltby, Mexborough, Penistone, Rawmarsh, Royston, Stocksbridge, Swinton, Tickhill, Wath upon Dearne, Wombwell and Worsbrough.
- The rural districts of Doncaster, Kiveton Park, Penistone, Rotherham, Thorne and Wortley
- Hemsworth Rural District less the parishes of Ackworth, Badsworth, Hessle and Hill Top, Huntwick with Foulby and Thorpe Audlin, Kirk Smeaton, Little Smeaton, North Elmsall, Nostell, South Elmsall, South Kirkby, Upton, Walden Stubbs and West Hardwick.

== Abolition ==
The shrievalty only existed for 12 years. Under the Local Government Act 1972, which came into effect on 1 April 1974, high sheriffs were appointed to each of the new metropolitan and non-metropolitan counties of England. Accordingly, a new office of High Sheriff of South Yorkshire was created, covering a similar area to the abolished Hallamshire jurisdiction.

== List of sheriffs ==
A list of the sheriffs from this period can be found below.

- 1962–1963 Colonel Sir Frederick Austin Neill, of Whinfell, Whirlow, Sheffield 11.
- 1963–1964 Colonel Sir Douglas Stephenson Branson, of 23 Ranmoor Park Road, Sheffield 10.
- 1964–1965 Major Harold George Warde-Norbury, of Hooton Pagnell Hall, Doncaster.
- 1965–1966 Lieutenant-Colonel Thomas Norman Boddy, of 10 Gladstone Road, Sheffield 10.
- 1966–1967 Percy James Clarke Bovill, of 357 Fulwood Road, Sheffield 10.
- 1967–1968 William Miles David, of South Lodge, Kirk Smeaton, near Pontefract.
- 1968–1969 Sir William Johnson Taylor, of Bentwood Cawthorne, near Barnsley.
- 1969–1970 Philip Harold Dixon, of Waldershaigh, Bolsterstone, Sheffield.
- 1970–1971 Sir Peter Geoffrey Roberts, 3rd Baronet, of Redholme, Sandygate Road, Sheffield 10.
- 1971–1972 William Warde-Aldam, of Frickley Hall, Frickley, Doncaster.
- 1972–1973 James Hugh Neill, of Lindrick Lodge, Woodsetts, near Worksop.
- 1973–1974 Gerard Francis Young, of 69 Carsick Hill Crescent, Sheffield.
