= Carrow Snuff Mill =

Windmill in Norwich, Norfolk, England

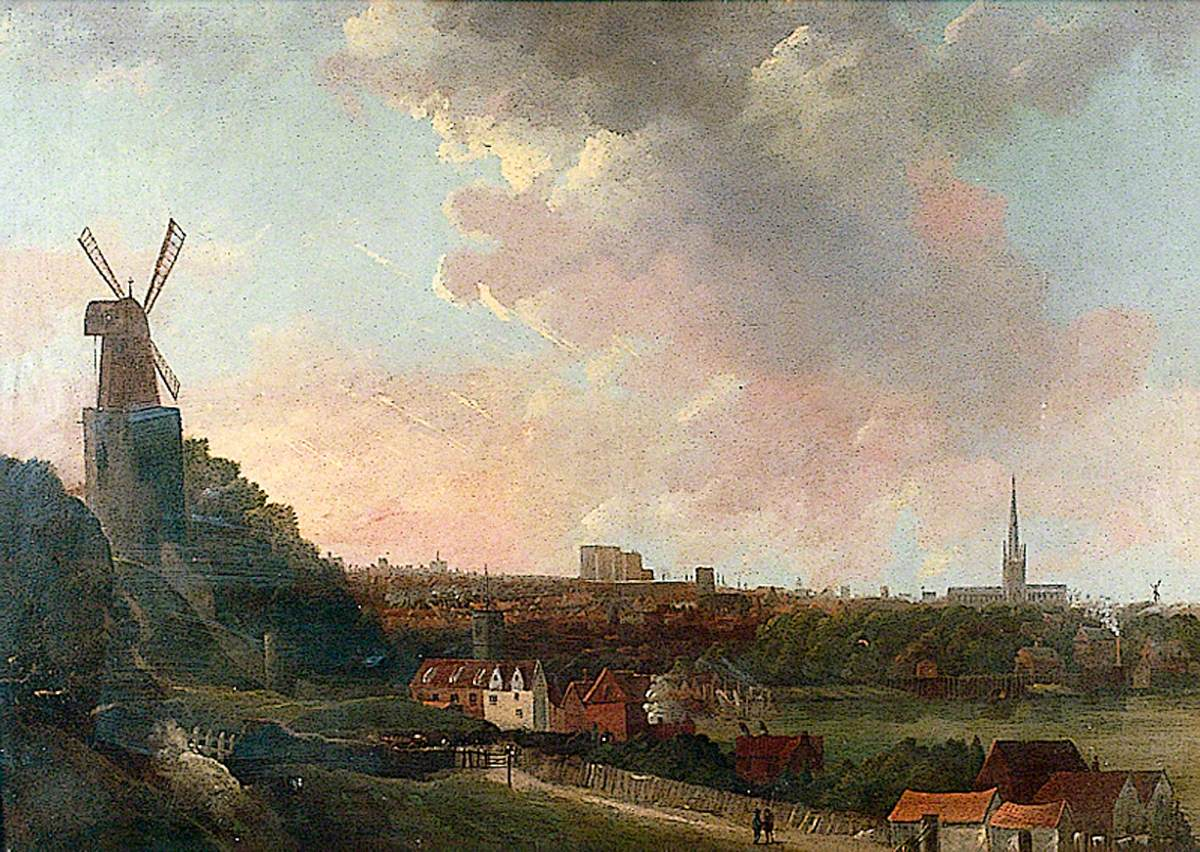
- Carrow Snuff Mill c.1780. Painting by John Ninham
- Interactive map of Carrow Snuff Mill

Origin
- Mill name: Carrow Snuff Mill
- Mill location: Black Tower, Carrow, Norwich, United Kingdom
- Grid reference: TG 2378 0761
- Coordinates: 52°37′12″N 1°18′16″E
- Year built: 1770s

Information
- Purpose: Snuff mill, later a cotton mill, then an observatory.
- Type: Smock mill
- Storeys: Two storey smock
- Base storeys: Three storey base
- No. of sails: Four
- Type of sails: Common sails
- Winding: Hand winded by endless chain
- Year lost: Burnt down in 1833

Carrow Snuff Mill was a smock mill that was built on the Black Tower, one of the towers of the city walls in Norwich, Norfolk, United Kingdom. Built in the 1770s as a cotton mill, it was later used as a snuff mill and an observatory until it was struck by ball lightning and burnt down in 1833.

== History ==
Carrow Snuff Mill was built between 1773 and 1778. Walter Livingstone was the occupier in 1783. He was a snuffmaker and tobacconist in Norwich, also at the Snuff Mill in the Wilderness. The mill was used as a snuff mill until at least 1790. William White was the owner in 1800, when he declared bankruptcy. The mill was offered for auction in April 1800. at that time a spinning mill for cotton. It was offered for rent in May 1800. A painting dated c. 1810 shows the mill to have stopped work, it being devoid of sails. The mill was struck by ball lightning in July 1833. The Black Tower was gutted by fire, and the mill with it. At the time, it was in use as an observatory.

== Description ==
Carrow Snuff Mill was a ten-sided smock mill, built on top of the Black Tower, Norwich, which forms part of Norwich city walls. The Black Tower is about 33 feet (10 m) diameter and 36 feet (11 m) tall. The smock would have been about 17 feet (5.2 m) diameter at the base and about 30 feet (9.1 m) tall. It had a domed cap with an extension at the rear for the winding wheel. Winding was by endless chain. Four Common sails were carried. They had a span of about 50 feet (15 m). The smock tower probably only contained the upright shaft, with machinery being housed in the Black Tower itself. The snuff milling machinery would either have been edge runner stones, or pestle and mortars.

== See also ==
- Sharrow Mills, a water powered snuff mill in Sheffield, South Yorkshire.
