= Beauchief Gardens =

Small area of formal parkland in south-west Sheffield, South Yorkshire, England

Coordinates: 53.3316°N 1.5141°W

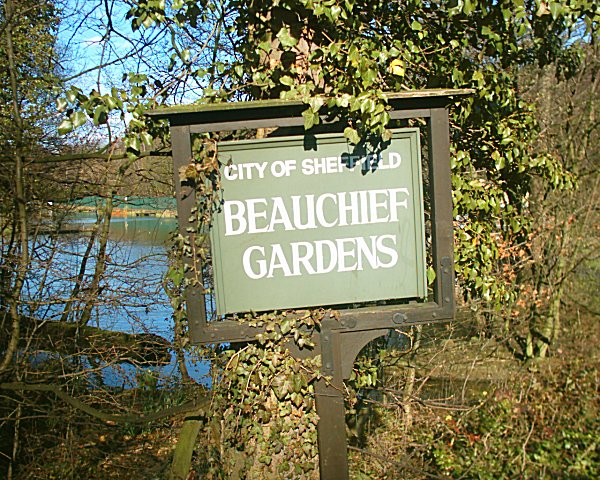

Beauchief Gardens is a small area of formal parkland in south-west Sheffield. The gardens lie between Abbeydale Road South to the north-west, the River Sheaf and the railway line to the south and Beauchief Dam to the east. The gardens were donated to the city by the J. G. Graves Trust in 1935, following the earlier donation, two years previously, of Abbeydale Industrial Hamlet (immediately downstream). The gardens had always been well kept and had their own gardener. The level of care had declined until the 1990s, when the Friends of Millhouses Park accepted the challenge of restoring the gardens. Clean-up events were organised in November 2004 and March 2005 to bring back the gardens to an acceptable level, which is the state the gardens are in now.

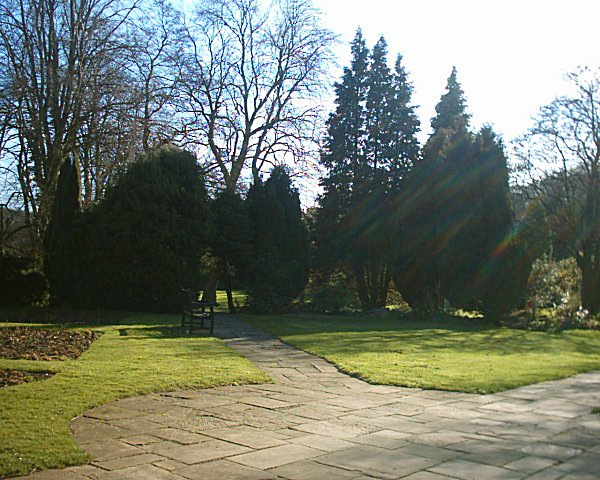

The gardens are a formal and neat grassed area, planted with coniferous trees and with the Limb Brook running through. The stream traverses the gardens and fills up Beauchief Dam.
