= Limb Brook =

Stream in Sheffield, England

Coordinates: 53.350°N 1.565°W

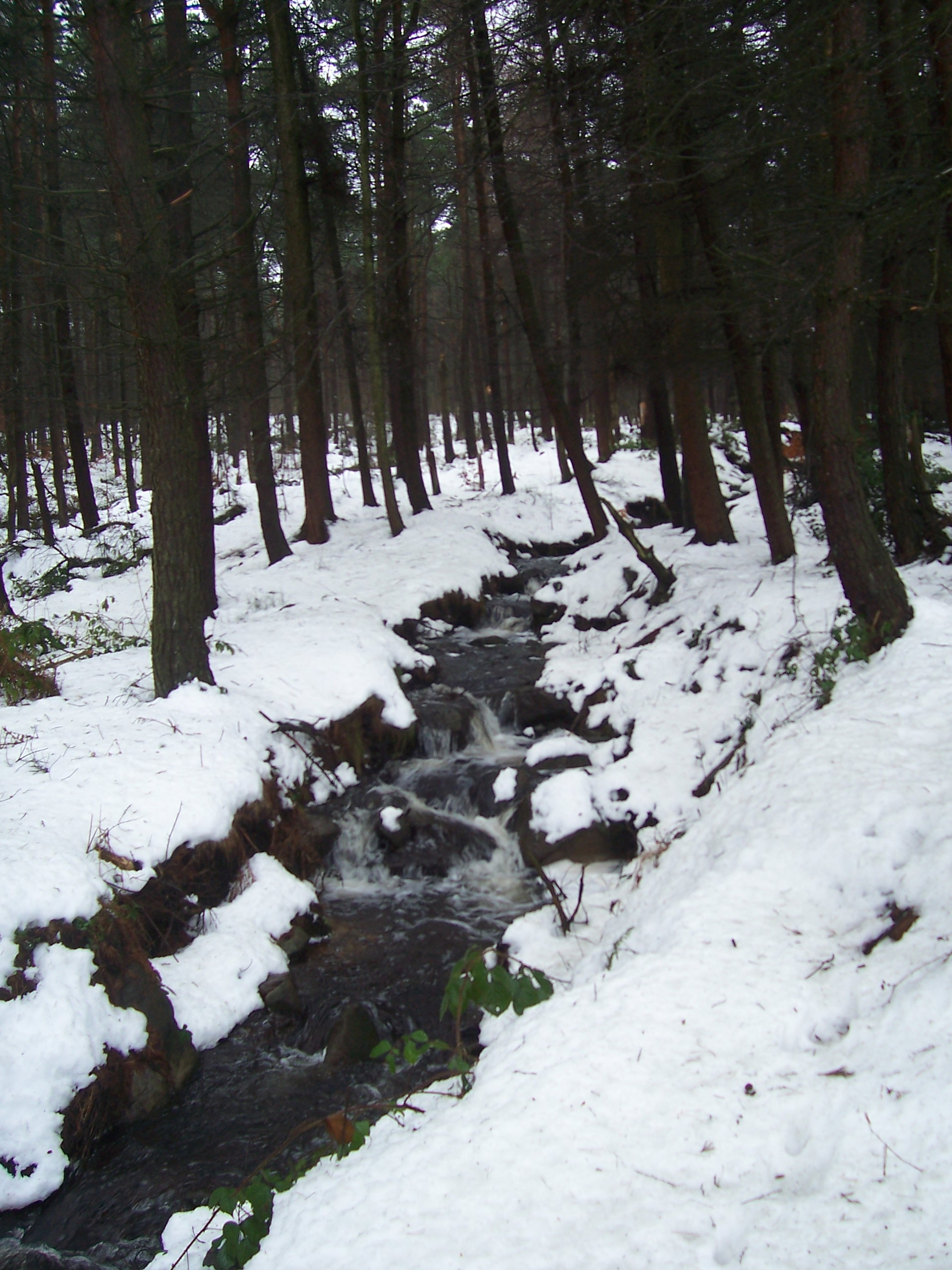
Limb Brook in Lady Cannings's Plantation above Ringinglow

The Limb Brook is a stream in Sheffield, South Yorkshire, England. It rises at the village of Ringinglow, flowing east through Whirlow and Ecclesall Woods into Abbeydale in the Beauchief area, where it merges with the River Sheaf. Near this point part of the stream has been diverted to provide the goit for the Abbeydale Industrial Hamlet millpond, and this channel flows through what is now Beauchief Gardens.

== History ==
On nearby Fulwood Lane a polished Neolithic stone axehead was found in 1952 indicating ancient human activity in the area.

An interim report by University of Sheffield staff on excavations of a linear feature at Sheephill Farm, close to the brook has suggested evidence of the route of the lost Roman Road linking Templeborough with the Roman Signal Station at Navio and Batham Gate. The feature, which extends through Barber Fields is 20m wide and filled to a depth of 5m with rubble and has a metalled surface. The route of the Roman Road would have passed close to the Roman Villa known to have existed at nearby Whirlow Hall Farm.

Limb Brook lies entirely within the City of Sheffield boundaries, but forms (with the connecting River Sheaf and Meers Brook) part of the historic border between Yorkshire and Derbyshire. This boundary dates back to the Anglo-Saxon kingdoms of Mercia and Northumbria. Sidney Oldall Addy, in his 1888 book on the Sheffield dialect mentions that this stream is called Fenny Brook on the Ordnance Survey map, where it flows past Ringinglow.

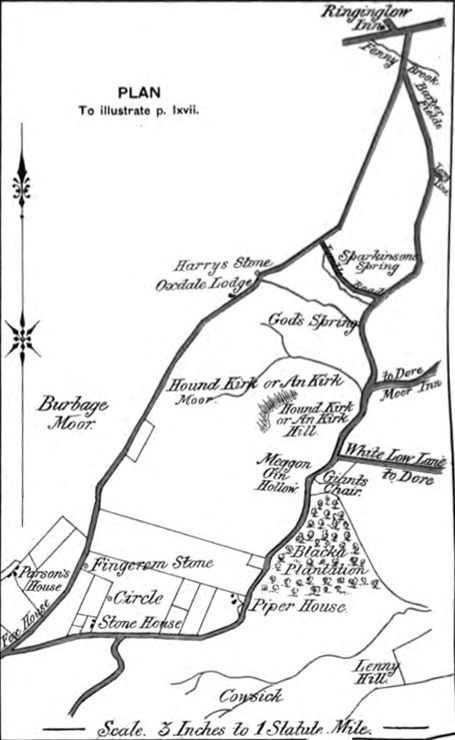
Sidney Oldall Addy's 1888 map, used to illustrate his book on the Sheffield dialect. Limb Brook is shown as Fenny Brook. The Ringinglow Inn is now known as the Norfolk Arms.

The brook has long been used as a source of power for local industry; remains of water-powered mills used variously for smelting lead and grinding corn can be seen at Whirlow Wheel and Ryecroft Mill in Ecclesall Woods.

Historical evidence of shallow coal drift-mining of the Ringinglow seam which lies on top of the Chatsworth Grit has been found in the Barber Fields area. The workings extended beneath the watercourse. Stratigraphically this was the lowest coal seam ever worked in the Sheffield area. The mine was served by a short railway which, along with the mine is no more. All that remains is a spoil-heap on the North bank of the brook. The mine is one of the few known examples of a shallow drift to have been worked by a small number of men in the Sheffield area.

Close to the drift-mine was a copperas works. This was disused by 1877.

Today, the brook no longer supports any industry, but with the woodlands of the Limb valley provides a valuable recreational resource for the inhabitants of Sheffield. It is owned and administered by the city council's recreation department, who maintain the area for the benefit of wildlife and the public. Sheffield Round Walk follows almost the entire route of the Limb brook, from Abbeydale Road South to Ringinglow.

== Flora and fauna ==
Limb Brook rises in a sphagnum moss bog by the side of Ringinglow Road and then flows through Lady Canning's Plantation, a coniferous woodland, managed by Sheffield City Council Parks and Countryside Service. It then flows slowly through farmland, where it provides an environment for reeds and sedges. As it descends into the Limb valley and down through Ecclesall Woods, it is surrounded by steep hillsides which support mature woodland, including Beech, Sycamore, Alder, Ash and Hazel. This is a rich environment for invertebrates and many birds and mammals, including kingfishers and water voles. The rare white-clawed crayfish has also been seen.

In 2023 Sheffield and Rotherham Wildlife Trust built 50 'leaky dams' to help reduce flooding lower down the valley. Above the brook over 13,000 trees were planted at Rough Standhills to create a new woodland to replace the larch plantation lost to Phytophthora ramorum disease.
