= Blade mill =

A blade mill was a variety of water mill used for sharpening newly fabricated blades, including scythes, swords, sickles, and knives.

In the Sheffield area, they were known as cutlers wheels, scythesmiths wheels, etc. Examples are preserved in Abbeydale Industrial Hamlet. They also existed in the 17th century and 18th century in Birmingham and in connection with the scythe industry in Belbroughton and Chaddesley Corbett in north Worcestershire. There were also small numbers in other areas of England.

A water wheel was used to turn a grind stone, which wore down from being up to two metres in diameter to a 'cork' of a fraction of this size. The dust generated by the process was bad for the grinder's health, and many of them died young from 'grinder's disease'.
