= Ecclesall Woods =

Woodland in south-west Sheffield, South Yorkshire, England

Coordinates: 53.34°N 1.51°W

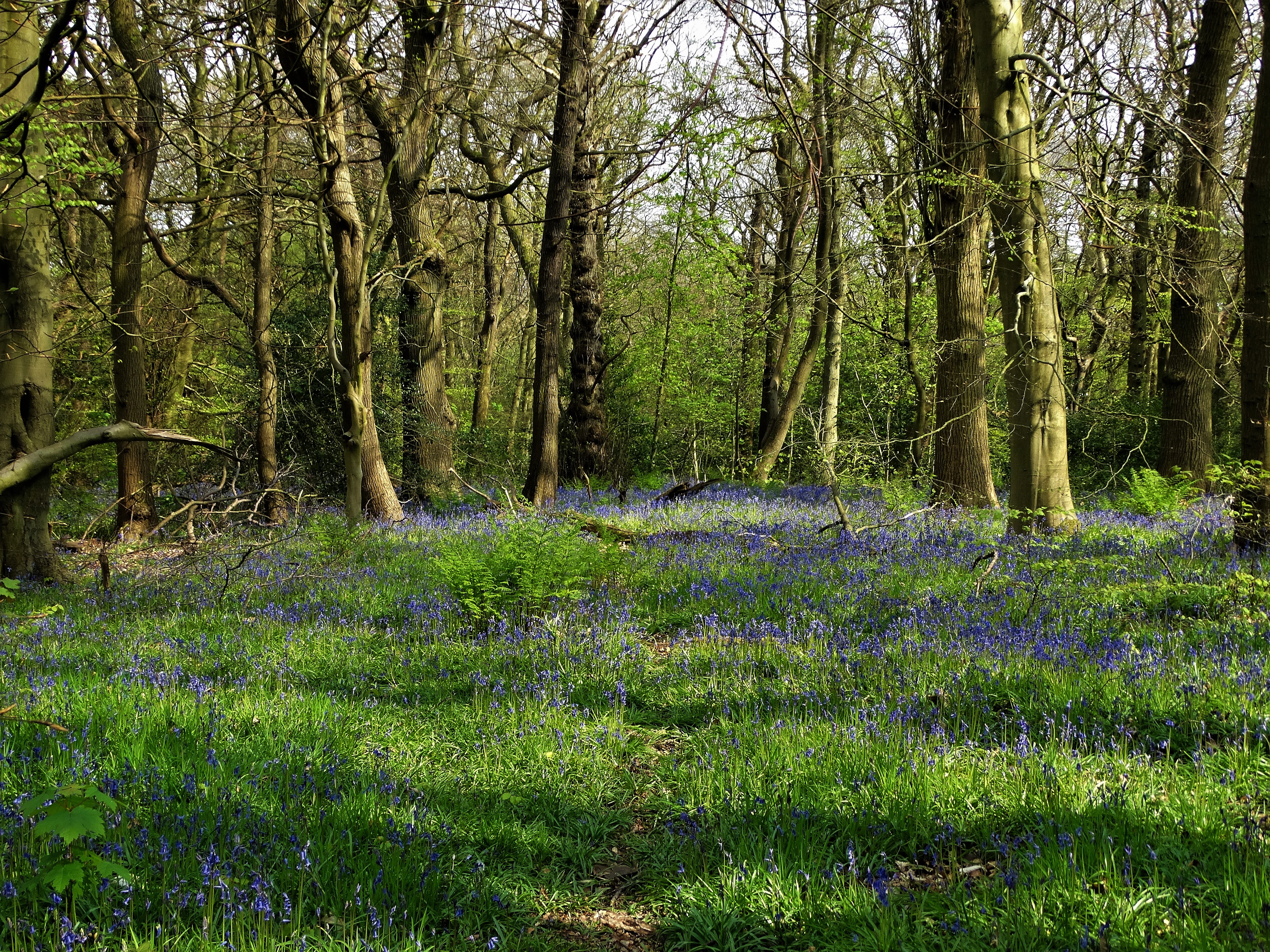
Ecclesall Woods, Sheffield, South Yorkshire, England

Ecclesall Woods is an area of woodland in south-west Sheffield, South Yorkshire, England, between Abbeydale Road South and Ecclesall. It covers approximately 350 acres (1.4 km^{2}) of mature semi-natural deciduous woodland which was previously used for timber and charcoal, and is currently managed by the city council for the benefit of wildlife and visitor access. There are two roads and over 10 miles (16 km) of public footpaths running through the woods. The Abbeydale miniature railway is also located within the woods.

They are a Local Nature Reserve.

== Notable features ==
There are two mills sited within the woods and several other items of archaeological interest.

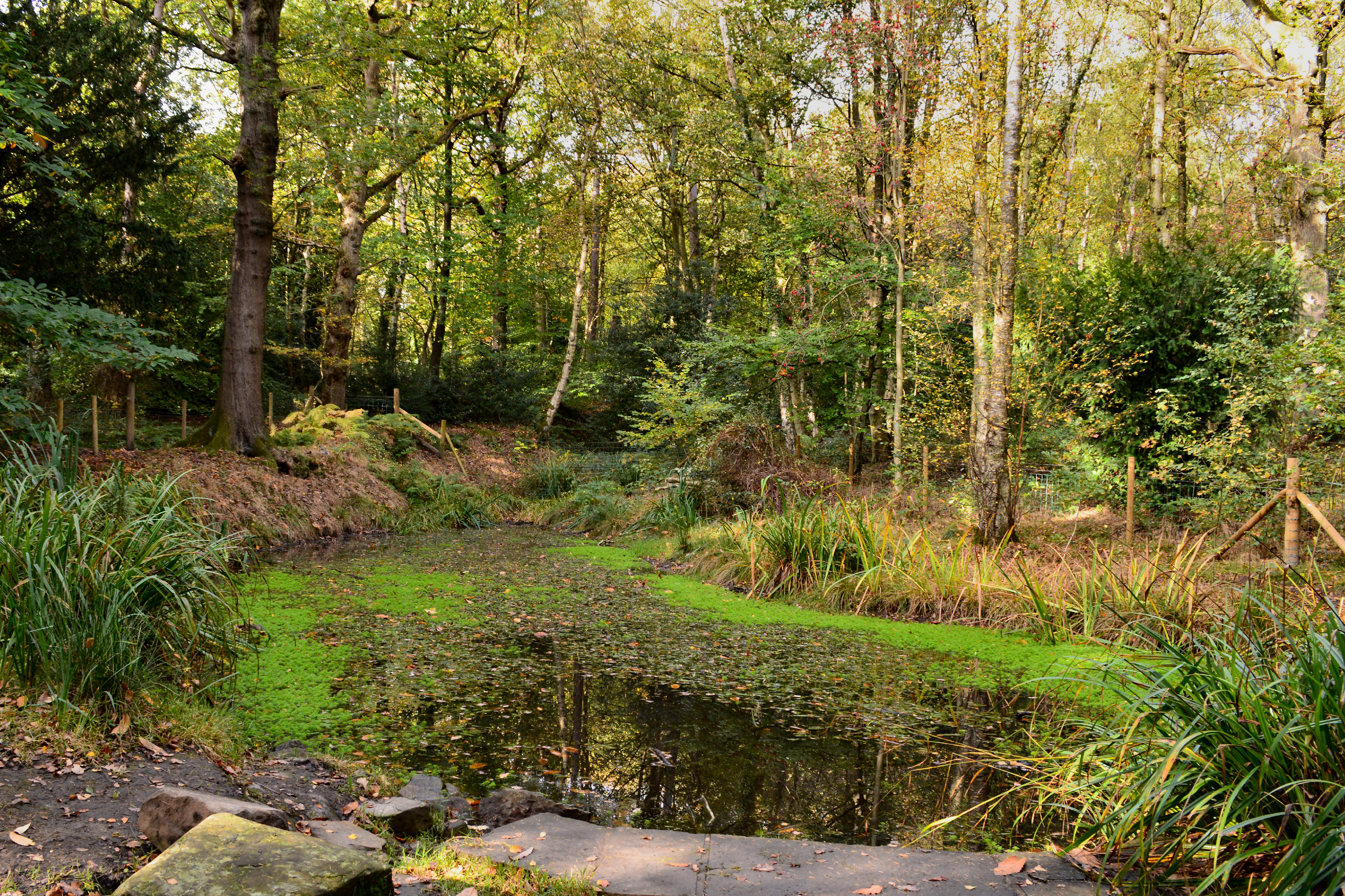
Colliers Pond

=== Ryecroft Mill ===
Ryecroft Mill was a water-powered lead smelting mill on the Limb Brook. The mill dates from at least as far back as the 17th century and was used for lead smelting, and later grinding corn.

=== Ecclesall Woods Sawmill ===
There is a modern sawmill within the woods, which was built after extensive storm damage to trees in 1962. It is operated by a private company, but there are plans to use it as both a working sawmill and an information centre.

=== Ryecroft Bridge ===
The stone bridge over the Ryecroft Brook is a Grade II listed building.

=== Q pits ===
There are a hundred charcoal hearths and two hundred Q pits, believed to have been used for manufacture of white coal.

=== Prehistoric carved stone ===
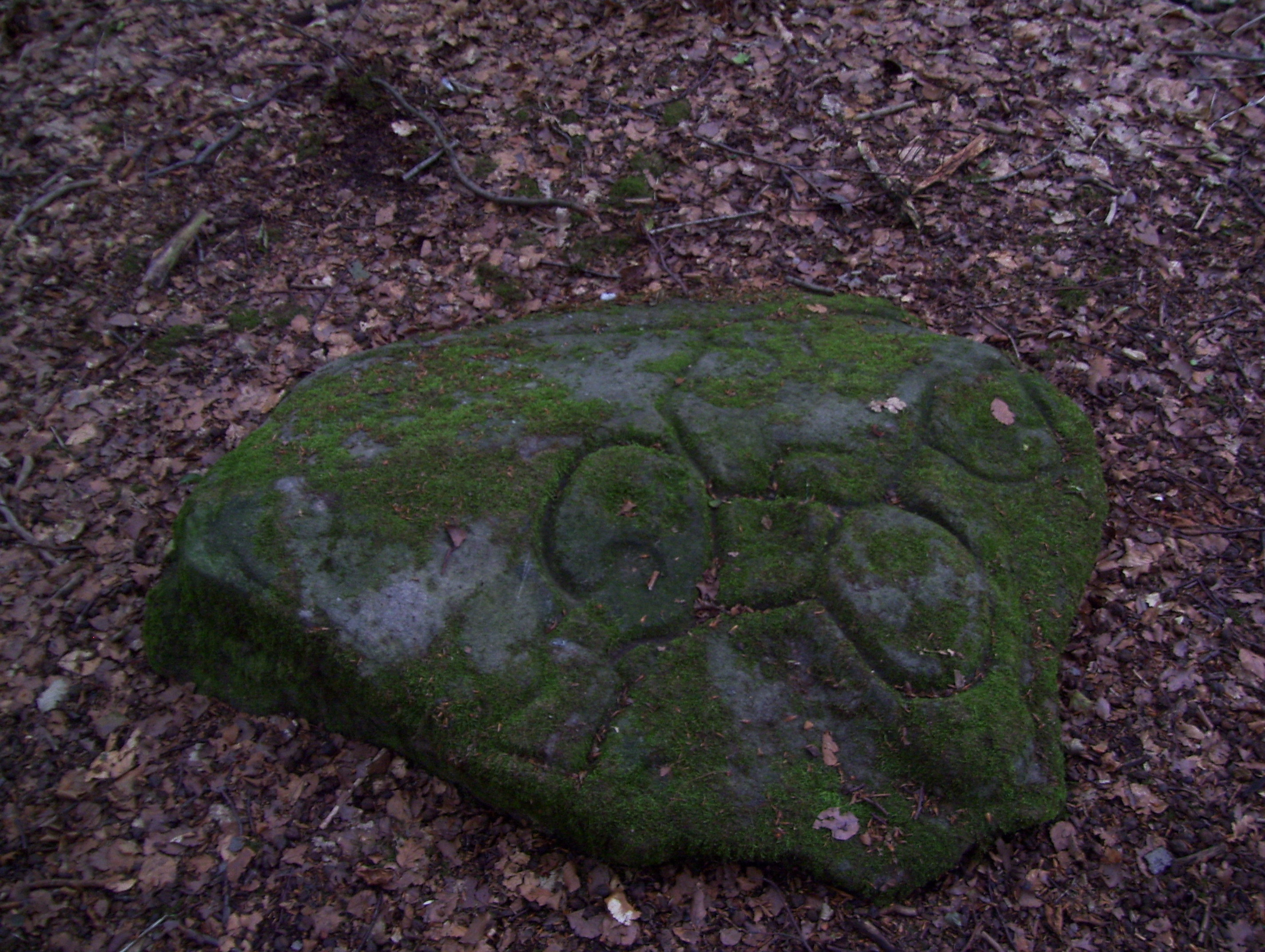
Rock Art

A cup and ring-marked stone was discovered in 1981, and has been dated to the late Neolithic or Bronze Age periods. It, and the 6 feet (1.8 m) diameter around it, is a scheduled ancient monument.

=== Charcoal burner's grave ===
There is a grave stone dating from 1786, commemorating the death of George Yardley killed in an accidental fire in his woodland home, after an evening in the local hostelry on Abbey Lane. There is also an information plaque about the incident on the wall of the Public House, which is still trading. The grave is a grade II listed structure.

=== Abbeydale miniature railway ===
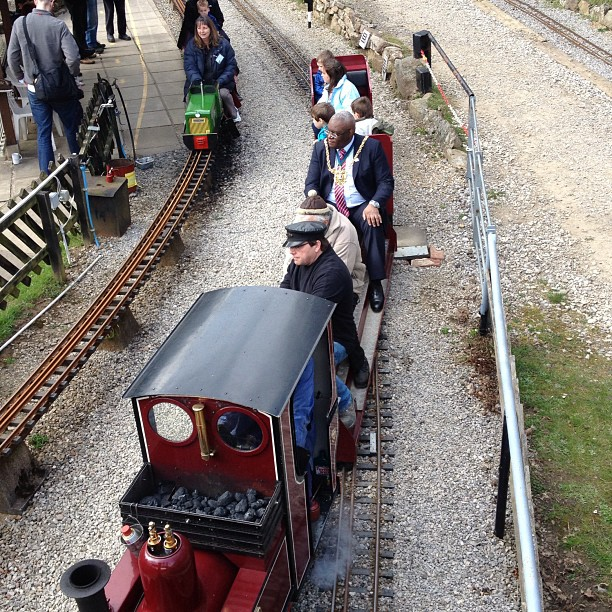
A train at Abbeydale miniature railway.

The miniature railway is run by the Sheffield & District Society of Model & Experimental Engineers Ltd. It has two sections: a dual gauge ground level section with gauges of 7 1/4 inches (180 mm) and 5 inches (130 mm). There is also a smaller multigauge raised section that has gauges of 3 1/2 inches (89 mm), 5 inches (130 mm) and 7 1/4 inches (180 mm). The society owns a diesel locomotive named 'Edward' on the ground level. There are also two electric locomotives named 'Merlin' and 'Vulcan' also owned by the society for use on the raised track. The society also runs a garden railway that operates trains on 32 mm (1.26 in) and 45 mm (1.772 in) gauge track this is known as the 'Ecclesall Woods Light Railway'.
