= Company of Cutlers in Hallamshire =

Coordinates: 53°22′56″N 1°28′11″W

Cutlers' Company's Act 1623
- Act of Parliament
- Parliament of England
- Long title: An Act for incorporating the makers of knives and other cutlery wares in Hallamshire in the county of York.
- Citation: 21 Jas. 1. c. 31
- Territorial extent: England and Wales

Dates
- Royal assent: 29 May 1624
- Commencement: 12 February 1624 (Note: Start of session.)

Status: Current legislation

Text of statute as originally enacted

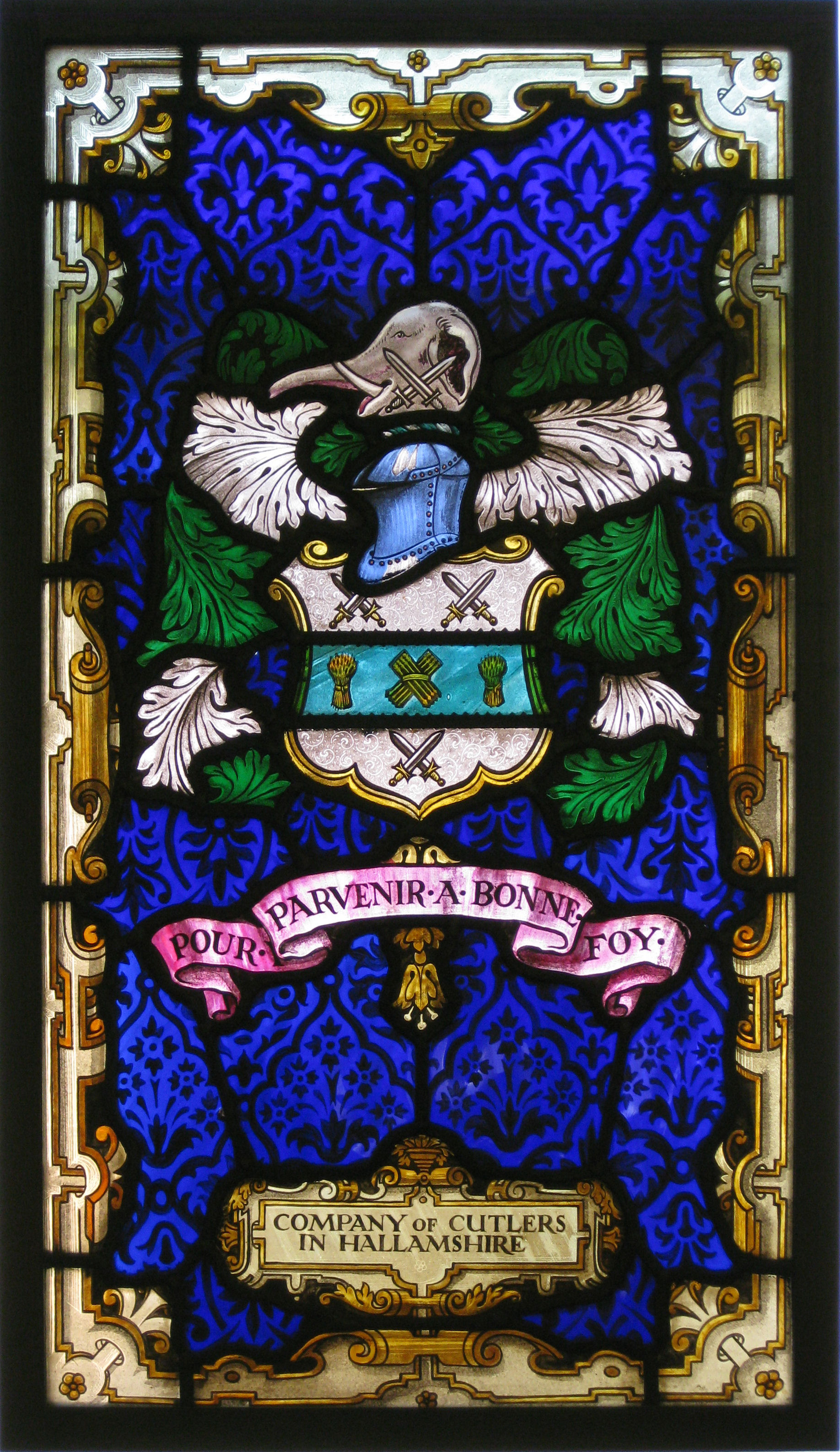
Arms and Motto on Stained Glass Window in Cutlers' Hall

The Company of Cutlers in Hallamshire is a trade guild of metalworkers based in Sheffield, England. It was incorporated in 1624 by an act of Parliament. The head is called the Master Cutler. Its motto is French: Pour Y Parvenir a Bonne Foi, lit. 'To Succeed through Honest Endeavour'.

In the original act of Parliament, the Cutlers' Company's Act 1623 (21 Jas. 1. c. 31), the company was given jurisdiction over:

"all persons using to make Knives, Blades, Scissers, Sheeres, Sickles, Cutlery wares and all other wares and manufacture made or wrought of yron and steele, dwelling or inhabiting within the said Lordship and Liberty of Hallamshire, or within six miles compasse of the same".

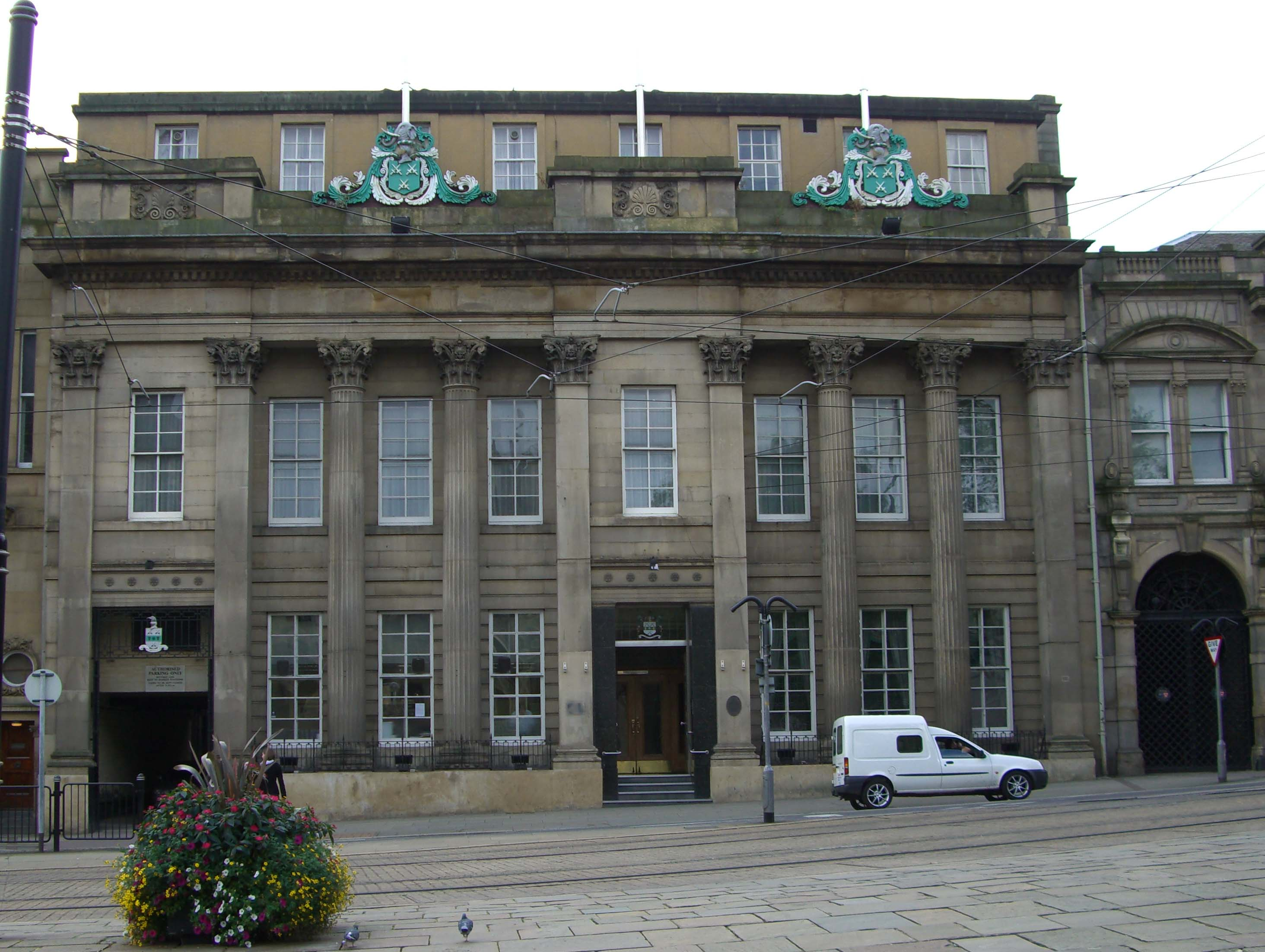
The Cutlers' Hall in Sheffield City Centre

This was expanded to include other trades by later acts, most notably steelmakers in 1860. In the same year the Company was given the right to veto any proposed name of a limited company anywhere in the United Kingdom which contains the word "Sheffield". It also supplies marks to approved cutlers and promotes Sheffield steelware.

The company has been based at Cutlers' Hall (opposite the cathedral on Church Street) since 1638. The current hall is the third to have been built on the site. The second was built in 1725 and the third in 1832. It was extended in 1867 and 1888. It was listed a Grade II* listed building in 1973. It is used for formal functions and award ceremonies for local businesses.

Members of the company are called freemen and currently number 447. The Master Cutler is elected each year from the freemen within the company. He or she also has two wardens, six searchers and 24 assistants. The company also employs a clerk for administration and a beadle to perform ceremonial duties. Since 1625, the Company has held an annual feast, inviting prominent people in order to showcase Sheffield's industry.

The Master Cutler for 2011–12 was Pamela Liversidge, the first woman to hold this position.

The Master Cutler for October 2017–2018 (the 379th) was Ken Cooke.

== Legislation ==
- Cutlers' Company's Act 1623 (21 Jas. 1. c. 31)

Cutlers' Company's Act 1791
- Act of Parliament
- Parliament of Great Britain
- Long title: An Act for the better Regulation and Government of the Company of Cutlers, within the Liberty of Hallamshire, in the County of York, and within Six Miles of the said Liberty, and of their Journeymen and Apprentices.
- Citation: 31 Geo. 3. c. 58
- Territorial extent: Great Britain

Dates
- Royal assent: 10 June 1791
- Commencement: 10 August 1790 (Note: Start of session.)
Other legislation
Amended by	Cutlers' Company's Act 1801; Cutlers' Company's Act 1814; Cutlers' Company's Act 1860

Status: Amended

Text of statute as originally enacted

- Cutlers' Company's Act 1791 (31 Geo. 3. c. 58)

Cutlers' Company's Act 1801
- Act of Parliament
- Parliament of the United Kingdom
- Long title: An Act for amending and rendering more effectual an Act passed in the Thirty first Year of the Reign of His present Majesty,[e] for the better Regulation and Government of the Company of Cutlers, within the Liberty of Hallamshire, in the County of York, and within Six Miles of the said Liberty, and of their Journeymen and Apprentices.
- Citation: 41 Geo. 3. (U.K.) c. xcvii
- Territorial extent: United Kingdom

Dates
- Royal assent: 20 June 1801
- Commencement: 20 June 1801 (Note: The Acts of Parliament (Commencement) Act 1793.)
Other legislation
Amends	Cutlers' Company's Act 1791
Amended by	Cutlers' Company's Act 1860

Status: Amended

Text of statute as originally enacted

- Cutlers' Company's Act 1801 (41 Geo. 3. (U.K.) c. xcvii)

Cutlers' Company's Act 1814
- Act of Parliament
- Parliament of the United Kingdom
- Long title: An Act to repeal certain Parts of an Act passed in the Thirty first Year of His present Majesty, for the better Regulation and Government of the Company of Cutlers within the Liberty, of Hallamshire in the County of York, and to alter and amend the said Act.
- Citation: 54 Geo. 3. c. cxix
- Territorial extent: United Kingdom

Dates
- Royal assent: 17 June 1814
- Commencement: 17 June 1814
Other legislation
Amends	Cutlers' Company's Act 1791

Status: Current legislation

Text of statute as originally enacted

- Cutlers' Company's Act 1814 (54 Geo. 3. c. cxix)

Cutlers' Company's Act 1860
- Act of Parliament
- Parliament of the United Kingdom
- Long title: An Act for amending the Acts passed with respect to the Master, Wardens, Searchers, Assistants, and Commonalty of the Company of Cutlers in Hallamshire in the County of York.
- Citation: 23 & 24 Vict. c. xliii
- Territorial extent: United Kingdom

Dates
- Royal assent: 15 May 1860
- Commencement: 15 May 1860
Other legislation
Amends	Cutlers' Company's Act 1791; Cutlers' Company's Act 1801

Status: Current legislation

Text of statute as originally enacted

- Cutlers' Company's Act 1860 (23 & 24 Vict. c. xliii)
