= Master Cutler =

The Master Cutler is the head of the Company of Cutlers in Hallamshire established in 1624. Their role is to act as an ambassador of industry in Sheffield, England. The Master Cutler is elected by the freemen of the company on the first Monday of September of each year and the position taken in the first Tuesday of October. Despite the title, the Master Cutler does not have to be involved in the cutlery business, or even the steel industry, to be elected.

The first Master Cutler was Robert Sorsby (1577–1643). His son, Malin Sorsby, was Master Cutler in 1647, and in turn his son Robert Sorsby took the office in 1669. Another Robert Sorsby, a cousin of the first, held the post in 1628.

The Installation of the new Master Cutler and Company follows the annual election of the new Company. In the early years of the company, the Election, Installation, Church Service and celebratory meal (which eventually became the Cutlers’ Feast) all happened on the same day. Now, only the Installation and Church Service, followed by lunch, take place on the same day.

== List of Masters Cutler ==
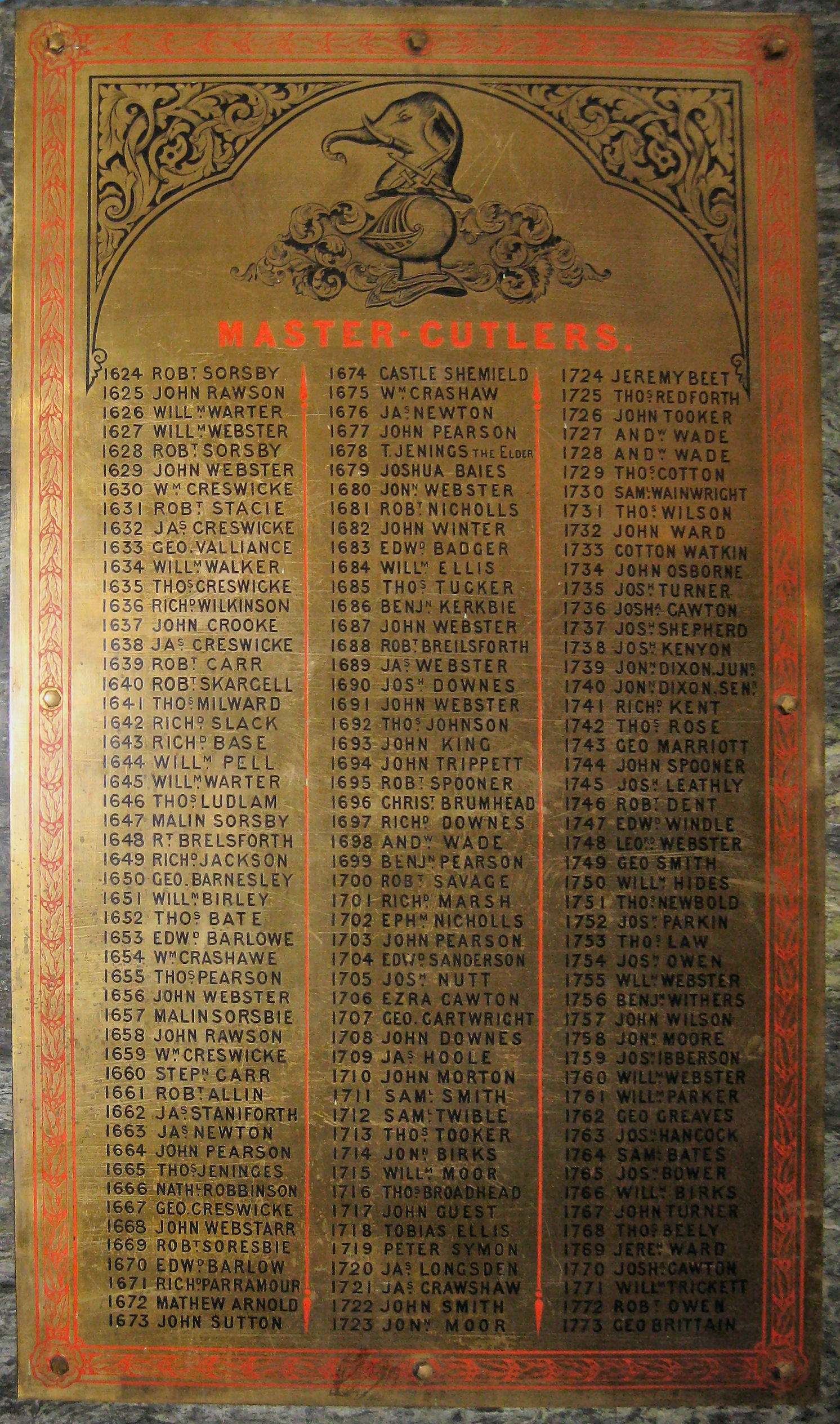
Brass Plaque in Cutlers' Hall

Notable and recent Masters Cutler have included:

- 1624 Robert Sorsby
- 1662 James Staniforth
- 1731 Thomas Wilson
- 1790 Joseph Ward
- 1798 Samuel Broomhead Ward
- 1808 Ebenezer Rhodes
- 1816 Thomas Asline Ward
- 1855 Frederick Mappin
- 1863 Thomas Jessop
- 1865–66 Sir John Brown
- 1867-9 Mark Firth
- 1870 William Bragge
- 1872 Thomas Vickers
- 1880 William Chesterman
- 1899 Robert Hadfield
- 1902 Albert J. Hobson
- 1908 Douglas Vickers
- 1911 Arthur Balfour
- 1913 Thomas William Ward
- 1914–18 William Henry Ellis
- 1919 Henry Kenyon Stephenson
- 1932 Arthur Lee
- 1935 Samuel Roberts
- 1937 Col. Frederick Austin Neill
- 1956 Sir Peter Roberts, 3rd Baronet
- 1958 Hugh Neill
- 1965 Eric Mensworth
- 1966 Antony B Hampton
- 1967 John Basil Peile
- 1973 Ken Lewis
- 1974 Charles Graham Murray
- 1990 Hugh Sykes
- 1998 Douglas and Pamela Liversidge (Master and Mistress Cutler)
- 1999 H. Stuart Johnson
- 2000 Vernon Smith
- 2001 Richard Prest
- 2002 John Bramah
- 2003 Neil Turner
- 2004 John Tissiman
- 2005 Timothy Reed
- 2006 Alan Reid
- 2007 Gordon W. Bridge
- 2008 Martin G. Howell
- 2009 James Newman
- 2010 William Speirs
- 2011 Pamela Liversidge
- 2012 Neil MacDonald
- 2013 Tony Pedder
- 2014 David Grey
- 2015 Craig McKay
- 2016 Richard Edwards
- 2017–18 Ken Cooke
- 2018–19 Nicholas Cragg
- 2019–2021 Nicholas D. O. Williams (Serving twice due to the COVID-19 pandemic)
- 2021–2022 James Andrew Tear
- 2022–2023 Dame Julie Kenny
- 2023–2024 Charles Turner
- 2024–2025 Philip Rodrigo
- 2025–2026 Keith Jackson
- 2026-2027 Ian Nicholls

== The eponymous train ==
In 1947 at a meeting of the Company of Cutlers in Hallamshire Ronald Matthews, a former holder of the office and Chairman of the London and North Eastern Railway suggested that the 7.40 train from Sheffield Victoria to London Marylebone, returning at 18.15, should be named after the Master Cutler. This was agreed by both the Company of Cutlers and the LNER. The Master Cutler was introduced by the LNER on 6 October 1947, running on the Great Central Main Line route from Sheffield Victoria to London Marylebone calling at only Nottingham Victoria and Leicester Central. The then Master Cutler, A Balfour, later the 2nd Lord Riverdale, rode on the footplate of the inaugural train. It has since been a tradition that the Master Cutler ride with the driver of the train during their year of office. Upon nationalisation in 1948, the service became the responsibility of the Eastern Region of British Railways. Known to staff simply as "The Cutler", the train carried a restaurant car and was generally hauled by a Gresley A3 Pacific.
