= Listed buildings in Sheffield S11 =

The S11 district lies within the City of Sheffield, South Yorkshire, England. The district contains 97 listed buildings that are recorded in the National Heritage List for England. Of these, seven are listed at Grade II*, the middle grade, and the others are at Grade II, the lowest grade. The district is in the south west of the city of Sheffield, and covers the areas of Banner Cross, Bents Green, Ecclesall, Ecclesall Road, Endcliffe, Greystones, Hunter's Bar, Sharrow Vale, Parkhead, Ringinglow and Whirlow, plus parts of Millhouses and Nether Edge.

For neighbouring areas, see listed buildings in Sheffield City Centre, listed buildings in S2, listed buildings in S3, listed buildings in S7, listed buildings in S10, listed buildings in S17, listed buildings in Grindleford and listed buildings in Hathersage.

== Key ==
Grade	Criteria
II*	Particularly important buildings of more than special interest
II	Buildings of national importance and special interest

== Buildings ==
Name and location	Street	Photograph	Date	Notes	Grade
Fox House; 53.31864°N 1.60158°W	Hathersage Road		Mid 17th century		II
Thryft House; 53.35086°N 1.53264°W	Ringinglow Road		Mid 17th century		II
25 Haugh Lane; 53.35250°N 1.52184°W	Haugh Lane		Early 18th century		II
Sharrow Mills Dam Walls; 53.36824°N 1.49284°W	Ecclesall Road		Early 18th century		II
Whirlow Hall Farm; 53.34392°N 1.53381°W	Whirlow Lane		Early 18th century		II
Sharrow Mills; 53.36850°N 1.49258°W	Ecclesall Road		About 1737		II*
Packhorse Bridge; 53.32910°N 1.60590°W	N/A		About 1750	Located east of Carl Wark	II
Sharrow Head House; 53.36755°N 1.48752°W	Cemetery Road		1763		II
Mount Pleasant; 53.36708°N 1.47725°W	Sharrow Lane		About 1770		II*
Mount Pleasant Coach House and Stables; 53.36720°N 1.47767°W	Sharrow Lane		About 1770		II*
14 Ecclesall Road South; 53.35995°N 1.50873°W	Ecclesall Road South		Late 18th century		II
Greystones Hall; 53.36518°N 1.51550°W	Greystones Hall Road		Late 18th century		II
4 and 6 Ivy Cottages; 53.36189°N 1.53462°W	Whiteley Wood Road		Late 18th century		II
Sharrow Mills East Bridge and Gate Pier; 53.36870°N 1.49238°W	Ecclesall Road		Late 18th century		II
Sharrow Mills Rear Bridge and Wall; 53.36856°N 1.49322°W	Ecclesall Road		Late 18th century		II
Sharrow Mills Stable Range and Coopers' Shop; 53.36890°N 1.49290°W	Ecclesall Road		Late 18th century		II
Sharrow Mills Stables and Fan Room; 53.36848°N 1.49303°W	Ecclesall Road		Late 18th century		II
Whirlow Farmhouse; 53.34450°N 1.53110°W	Whirlow Lane		Late 18th century		II
Whiteley Wood Hall Stables, Wall and Gateway; 53.35750°N 1.54025°W	Whiteley Wood Lane		Late 18th century		II
8 Ivy Cottages; 53.36186°N 1.53482°W	Whiteley Wood Road		Late 18th century		II
Ringinglow Roundhouse; 53.34954°N 1.56453°W	Ringinglow Road		About 1778		II
Charnwood Hotel; 53.36774°N 1.47650°W	Sharrow Lane		About 1780		II
Chestnut Cottage and 71 Falkland Road; 53.35813°N 1.51360°W	Dobbin Hill		About 1780		II
Shepherd Wheel; 53.36449°N 1.52459°W	Hangingwater Road		About 1780		II*
All Saints; 53.35674°N 1.51195°W	Ecclesall Road South		1789		II
Former Methodist Chapel; 53.35800°N 1.53545°W	Whiteley Wood Road		1789	Now part of Meadow Lane Farm	II
Westbrook House; 53.36779°N 1.49146°W	Sharrow Vale Road		1795		II
Porter Bridge; 53.36368°N 1.52649°W	Hangingwater Road		About 1800		II
Hunter's Bar Toll Gate; 53.36750°N 1.50224°W	Ecclesall Road		About 1810		II
Banner Cross Hall; 53.35765°N 1.50877°W	Ecclesall Road South		1821	Designed by Jeffry Wyatville	II
Banner Cross Hall Ice House; 53.35676°N 1.51007°W	Ecclesall Road South		About 1821	Probably designed by Jeffry Wyatville	II
Banner Cross Hall Terrace Wall; 53.35738°N 1.50811°W	Ecclesall Road South		1821	Designed by Jeffry Wyatville	II
Banner Cross Hall Boundary Wall; 53.35740°N 1.51006°W	Ecclesall Road South		Early 19th century		II
210-212 Sharrow Vale Road; 53.36785°N 1.49515°W	Sharrow Vale Road		Early 19th century		II
Woodside House; 53.35691°N 1.49808°W	Brincliffe Edge Road		Early 19th century		II
Bents Green House; 53.35115°N 1.52368°W	Broad Elms Lane		1828		II
Westbrook Snuff Mill; 53.36762°N 1.48967°W	Sharrow Vale Road		About 1833		II
Montague House; 53.36821°N 1.48789°W	Cemetery Road		About 1836	Designed by Samuel Worth	II
Sheffield General Cemetery Catacombs; 53.36920°N 1.48904°W	General Cemetery		1836	Designed by Samuel Worth	II
Sheffield General Cemetery Main Gateway and Lodges; 53.36913°N 1.49031°W	Cemetery Avenue		1836	Designed by Samuel Worth	II*
Sheffield General Cemetery Nonconformist Chapel; 53.36868°N 1.48847°W	General Cemetery		1836	Designed by Samuel Worth	II*
Sheffield General Cemetery South Gateway, Screen and Walls; 53.36828°N 1.48715°W	Cemetery Road		1836	Designed by Samuel Worth	II*
William Parker Monument; 53.36860°N 1.48907°W	General Cemetery		1837		II
Norfolk Arms; 53.34980°N 1.56433°W	Ringinglow Road		About 1840		II
Union Hotel; 53.36119°N 1.49301°W	Union Road		About 1842		II
Kingswood Building; 53.36024°N 1.49461°W	Union Road		1843	Designed by William Flockton	II
Nether Edge Hospital Left Lodge; 53.36001°N 1.49368°W	Union Road		1843	Designed by William Flockton	II
Nether Edge Hospital Right Lodge; 53.36017°N 1.49362°W	Union Road		1843	Designed by William Flockton	II
Kenwood Hall North Lodge; 53.36517°N 1.48865°W	Rundle Road		About 1844	Probably designed by William Flockton	II
Sheffield General Cemetery Anglican Chapel; 53.36884°N 1.48632°W	General Cemetery		1848	Designed by William Flockton	II
George Bennet Memorial; 53.36831°N 1.48795°W	General Cemetery		About 1850		II
Vestry Hall; 53.37221°N 1.47875°W	Cemetery Road		1857		II
Cemetery Road Baptist Church; 53.37177°N 1.48032°W	Cemetery Road		1859		II
1 Rundle Road; 53.36521°N 1.48814°W	Rundle Road		About 1860		II
Parkhead Hall; 53.34496°N 1.52233°W	Ecclesall Road South		1865	Designed by J. B. Mitchell-Withers	II
Bow Works; 53.37101°N 1.48623°W	Pomona Street		1868		II
St Andrew; 53.36309°N 1.49482°W	St Andrew's Road		1869	Designed by J. B. Mitchell-Withers. Demolished in 2000 and replaced by Monarch Gate apartments.	II
Whirlow Court; 53.34193°N 1.52693°W	Ecclesall Road South		About 1870		II
James Nicholson Memorial; 53.36898°N 1.48778°W	General Cemetery		About 1872		II
The Towers; 53.36385°N 1.50046°W	Brincliffe Crescent		1874	Designed by Innocent and Brown	II
The Towers Lodge, Wall and Gate Piers; 53.36432°N 1.49982°W	Brincliffe Crescent		About 1874		II
Horn Handle Works; 53.37003°N 1.47881°W	Broom Close		Late 19th century		II
Sewer Gas Lamp; 53.35651°N 1.49566°W	Brincliffe Edge Road		Late 19th century	At junction with Union Road	II
Sewer Gas Lamp; 53.36734°N 1.48891°W	Cemetery Road		Late 19th century	At junction with Frog Walk	II
Sewer Gas Lamp; 53.36619°N 1.49767°W	Stewart Road		Late 19th century	Outside 69 Stewart Road	II
Mark Firth Monument; 53.36905°N 1.48770°W	General Cemetery		About 1880		II
Sharrow Mills New Mill	Ecclesall Road; 53.36872°N 1.49298°W		About 1880		II
Mylnhurst; 53.35089°N 1.50770°W	Button Hill		1883		II
Mylnhurst Lodge and Gateway; 53.35212°N 1.50736°W	Button Hill		1883		II
Jubilee Obelisk; 53.36774°N 1.50967°W	Endcliffe Park		1887		II
Endcliffe Park Pavilion and Lodge; 53.36740°N 1.50338°W	Endcliffe Park		1891		II
Baan Thai Restaurant; 53.37296°N 1.47698°W	Ecclesall Road		1894	Designed by J. B. Mitchell-Withers	II
Jubilee Monument and Railing; 53.36801°N 1.50549°W	Endcliffe Park		1897		II
St Augustine; 53.36903°N 1.50090°W	Brocco Bank		1897	Designed by John Dodsley Webster	II
1-18 George Woofindin Almshouses; 53.36851°N 1.50114°W	Ecclesall Road		1899		II
19 & 20 George Woofindin Almshouses; 53.36859°N 1.50038°W	Ecclesall Road		1899		II
George Woofindin Almshouses Bridge and Lamp; 53.36810°N 1.50142°W	Ecclesall Road		1899		II
George Woofindin Almshouses Wall and Gates; 53.36793°N 1.50128°W	Ecclesall Road		1899		II
Botanical Gardens Gateway and Railings; 53.37045°N 1.49458°W	Thompson Road		About 1900		II
Electric Transformer; 53.36214°N 1.52559°W	Greystones Road		About 1900	At junction with Highcliffe Road	II
Hollis Hospital Central Block; 53.33998°N 1.53150°W	Ecclesall Road South		1903	Designed by Howard C. Clarke	II
Hollis Hospital East Block; 53.33986°N 1.53115°W	Ecclesall Road South		1903	Designed by Howard C. Clarke	II
Hollis Hospital North West Block; 53.33999°N 1.53174°W	Ecclesall Road South		1903	Designed by Howard C. Clarke	II
Hollis Hospital West Block; 53.33982°N 1.53162°W	Ecclesall Road South		1903	Designed by Howard C. Clarke	II
Queen Victoria Statue; 53.36778°N 1.50344°W	Endcliffe Park		1904	Designed by Alfred Turner	II
Rossi's Restaurant; 53.36729°N 1.47633°W	Sharrow Lane		About 1910		II
Psalter Lane Methodist Church; 53.36572°N 1.49208°W	Psalter Lane		About 1915	Now known as St Andrew's Psalter Lane.	II
Psalter Lane Methodist Church Wall and Gate Piers; 53.36613°N 1.49230°W	Psalter Lane		About 1915		II
Ecclesall War Memorial; 53.35613°N 1.51207°W	Ecclesall Road South		About 1920		II
Thomas Boulsover Monument; 53.36175°N 1.53572°W	Whiteley Wood Road		1927	At Wire Mill Dam	II
Banner Cross Methodist Church; 53.36013°N 1.50862°W	Ecclesall Road South		1929	Designed by William John Hale	II
Banner Cross Methodist Church Wall and Gate Piers; 53.35996°N 1.50830°W	Ecclesall Road South		1929	Designed by William John Hale	II
Wilson Road Synagogue; 53.36935°N 1.49894°W	Wilson Road		1930	Designed by Mansell Jenkinson	II
Wilson Road Synagogue Succah; 53.36915°N 1.49905°W	Wilson Road		1930	Designed by Mansell Jenkinson	II
Wilson Road Synagogue Wall and Gates; 53.36956°N 1.49877°W	Wilson Road		1930	Designed by Mansell Jenkinson	II
High Storrs School; 53.35759°N 1.52253°W	High Storrs Road		1933	Designed by W. G. Davis and J. L. Womersley	II
High Storrs School Walls, Railings and Gates; 53.35749°N 1.52165°W	High Storrs Road		1933	Designed by W. G. Davis and J. L. Womersley	II
