= Listed buildings in South Yorkshire =

There are a number of listed buildings in South Yorkshire. The term "listed building", in the United Kingdom, refers to a building or structure designated as being of special architectural, historical, or cultural significance. Details of all the listed buildings are contained in the National Heritage List for England. They are categorised in three grades: Grade I consists of buildings of outstanding architectural or historical interest, Grade II* includes significant buildings of more than local interest and Grade II consists of buildings of special architectural or historical interest. Buildings in England are listed by the Secretary of State for Culture, Media and Sport on recommendations provided by English Heritage, which also determines the grading.

Some listed buildings are looked after by the National Trust or English Heritage while others are in private ownership or administered by trusts.

== Listed buildings by grade ==
- Grade I listed buildings in South Yorkshire
- Grade II* listed buildings in South Yorkshire

== Listed buildings by civil parish or unparished area ==
=== Barnsley ===
- Listed buildings in Barnsley (Central Ward)
- Listed buildings in Barnsley (Kingstone Ward)
- Listed buildings in Barnsley (Old Town Ward)
- Listed buildings in Billingley
- Listed buildings in Brierley and Grimethorpe
- Listed buildings in Cawthorne
- Listed buildings in Cudworth, South Yorkshire
- Listed buildings in Darfield, South Yorkshire
- Listed buildings in Darton
- Listed buildings in Dearne North
- Listed buildings in Dearne South
- Listed buildings in Dodworth
- Listed buildings in Dunford
- Listed buildings in Great Houghton, South Yorkshire
- Listed buildings in Gunthwaite and Ingbirchworth
- Listed buildings in High Hoyland
- Listed buildings in Hoyland Milton
- Listed buildings in Hunshelf
- Listed buildings in Langsett
- Listed buildings in Monk Bretton
- Listed buildings in Oxspring
- Listed buildings in Penistone
- Listed buildings in Penistone East
- Listed buildings in Rockingham
- Listed buildings in Royston, South Yorkshire
- Listed buildings in Silkstone
- Listed buildings in Stainborough
- Listed buildings in Stairfoot
- Listed buildings in Tankersley, South Yorkshire
- Listed buildings in Thurgoland
- Listed buildings in Wombwell
- Listed buildings in Worsbrough
- Listed buildings in Wortley, South Yorkshire

=== Doncaster ===
- Listed buildings in Adwick le Street and Carcroft
- Listed buildings in Adwick upon Dearne
- Listed buildings in Auckley
- Listed buildings in Austerfield
- Listed buildings in Barnburgh
- Listed buildings in Barnby Dun with Kirk Sandall
- Listed buildings in Bawtry
- Listed buildings in Braithwell
- Listed buildings in Brodsworth
- Listed buildings in Burghwallis
- Listed buildings in Cadeby, South Yorkshire
- Listed buildings in Cantley, South Yorkshire
- Listed buildings in Clayton with Frickley
- Listed buildings in Conisbrough and Denaby
- Listed buildings in Doncaster (Balby South Ward)
- Listed buildings in Doncaster (Bentley Ward)
- Listed buildings in Doncaster (Bessacarr Ward)
- Listed buildings in Doncaster (Hexthorpe and Balby North Ward)
- Listed buildings in Doncaster (Town Ward)
- Listed buildings in Doncaster (Wheatley Hills and Intake Ward)
- Listed buildings in Edenthorpe
- Listed buildings in Edlington
- Listed buildings in Fenwick, South Yorkshire
- Listed buildings in Finningley
- Listed buildings in Fishlake
- Listed buildings in Hampole
- Listed buildings in Hatfield, South Yorkshire
- Listed buildings in Hickleton
- Listed buildings in High Melton
- Listed buildings in Hooton Pagnell
- Listed buildings in Kirk Bramwith
- Listed buildings in Loversall
- Listed buildings in Marr, South Yorkshire
- Listed buildings in Mexborough
- Listed buildings in Moss, South Yorkshire
- Listed buildings in Norton and Askern
- Listed buildings in Owston, South Yorkshire
- Listed buildings in Rossington
- Listed buildings in Sprotbrough and Cusworth
- Listed buildings in Stainforth, South Yorkshire
- Listed buildings in Stainton, South Yorkshire
- Listed buildings in Sykehouse
- Listed buildings in Thorne, South Yorkshire
- Listed buildings in Thorpe in Balne
- Listed buildings in Tickhill
- Listed buildings in Wadworth
- Listed buildings in Warmsworth

=== Rotherham ===
- Listed buildings in Anston
- Listed buildings in Aston cum Aughton
- Listed buildings in Bramley, Rotherham
- Listed buildings in Brampton Bierlow
- Listed buildings in Brinsworth
- Listed buildings in Catcliffe
- Listed buildings in Dinnington St. John's
- Listed buildings in Firbeck
- Listed buildings in Gildingwells
- Listed buildings in Harthill with Woodall
- Listed buildings in Hellaby
- Listed buildings in Hooton Levitt
- Listed buildings in Hooton Roberts
- Listed buildings in Laughton en le Morthen
- Listed buildings in Letwell
- Listed buildings in Maltby, South Yorkshire
- Listed buildings in Ravenfield
- Listed buildings in Rawmarsh
- Listed buildings in Rotherham (Boston Castle Ward)
- Listed buildings in Rotherham (East Ward)
- Listed buildings in Rotherham (Hoober Ward)
- Listed buildings in Rotherham (Keppel Ward)
- Listed buildings in Rotherham (Sitwell Ward)
- Listed buildings in Rotherham (West Ward)
- Listed buildings in Rotherham (Wingfield Ward)
- Listed buildings in Swinton, South Yorkshire
- Listed buildings in Thorpe Salvin
- Listed buildings in Thrybergh
- Listed buildings in Thurcroft
- Listed buildings in Todwick
- Listed buildings in Treeton
- Listed buildings in Ulley
- Listed buildings in Wales, South Yorkshire
- Listed buildings in Wath upon Dearne
- Listed buildings in Wentworth, South Yorkshire
- Listed buildings in Whiston, South Yorkshire
- Listed buildings in Wickersley
- Listed buildings in Woodsetts

=== City of Sheffield ===
- Listed buildings in Midhopestones
- Listed buildings in Sheffield
- Listed buildings in Sheffield City Centre
- Listed buildings in Sheffield S2
- Listed buildings in Sheffield S3
- Listed buildings in Sheffield S4
- Listed buildings in Sheffield S5
- Listed buildings in Sheffield S6
- Listed buildings in Sheffield S7
- Listed buildings in Sheffield S8
- Listed buildings in Sheffield S9
- Listed buildings in Sheffield S10
- Listed buildings in Sheffield S11
- Listed buildings in Sheffield S12
- Listed buildings in Sheffield S13
- Listed buildings in Sheffield S14
- Listed buildings in Sheffield S17
- Listed buildings in Sheffield S20
- Listed buildings in Sheffield S35
- Listed buildings in Stocksbridge
