= Plated ware =

Tableware plated with a precious metal

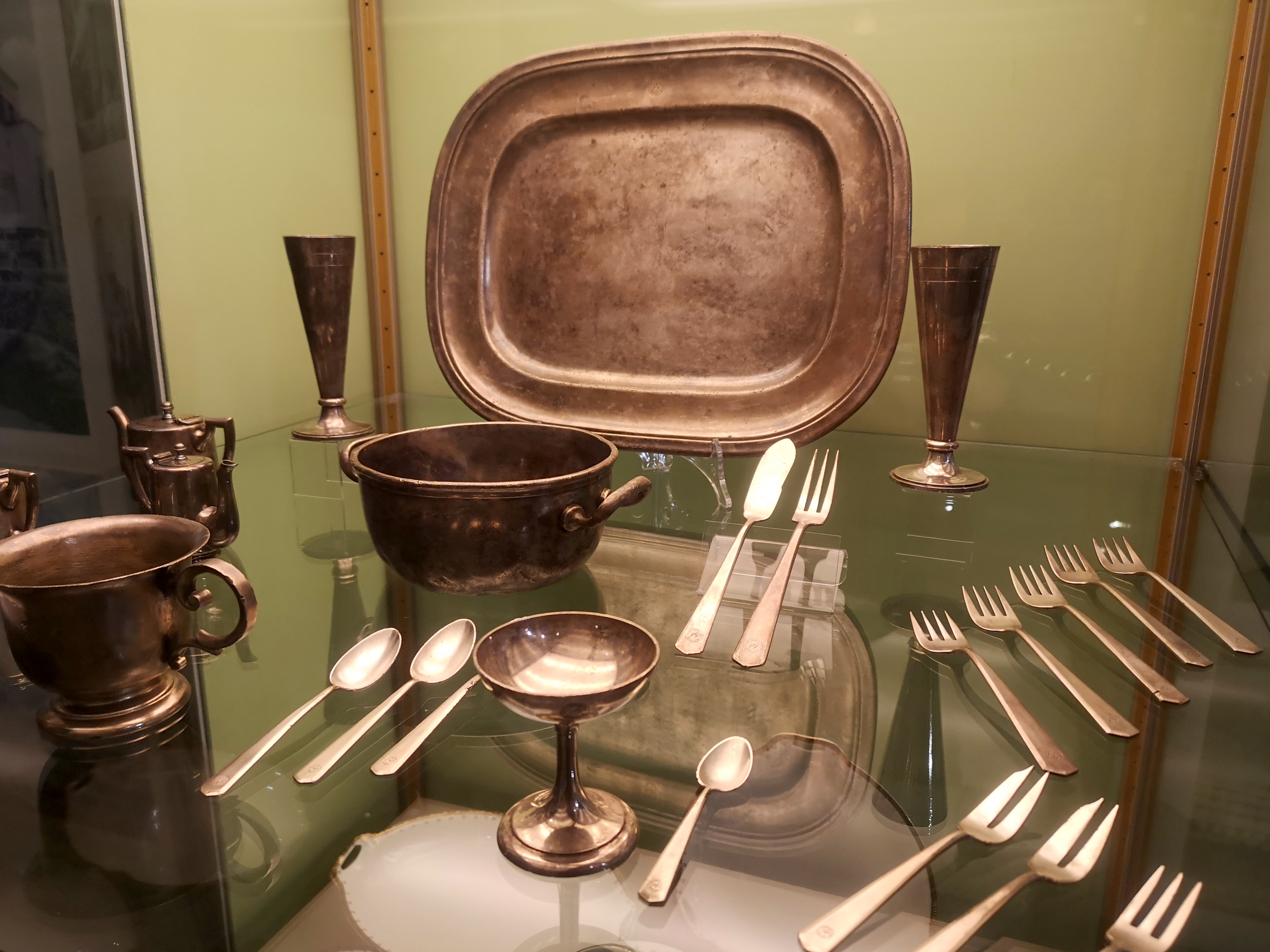
Plated tableware

Plated ware refers to articles chiefly intended for tableware consisting of a base metal or alloy covered by one of the precious metals, with the object of giving them the appearance of gold or silver. Historically, the standard amount of precious metal used was an ounce of silver per square foot of surface area (2.8cL per 930 cm^{2}). Although items hand-plated with metal leaf date back to ancient times, large scale production dates to 1742 when Thomas Boulsover, of Sheffield, England developed a process by which silver plates were fused to base metal (generally copper) ingots by heating them in a furnace with borax. The ingots were then rolled down to a sheet, and from these sheets silver-plated articles were made.

Large articles such as dish covers were originally only silver-plated on one side, and after being worked into shape were tinned inside. The process varied regionally; in the West Midlands, bar-copper was the base metal used, which when bare of silver appeared dark red, whilst in Sheffield copper mixed with brass, an alloy of copper and zinc was used. The Sheffield process resulted in a harder and stronger end product ("Sheffield plate") and was consequently more popular, and Sheffield became the world's leading producer of metal tableware and cutlery. Following John Wright and George Elkington's development of commercial electroplating in 1840 (the process still in use today) the traditional method of production fell into rapid decline, although it continues to be used for some items subject to very heavy wear (notably buttons).
