= Whiteley Wood Hall =

Country house in Fulwood, Sheffield, England

Coordinates: 53.357381°N 1.540076°W

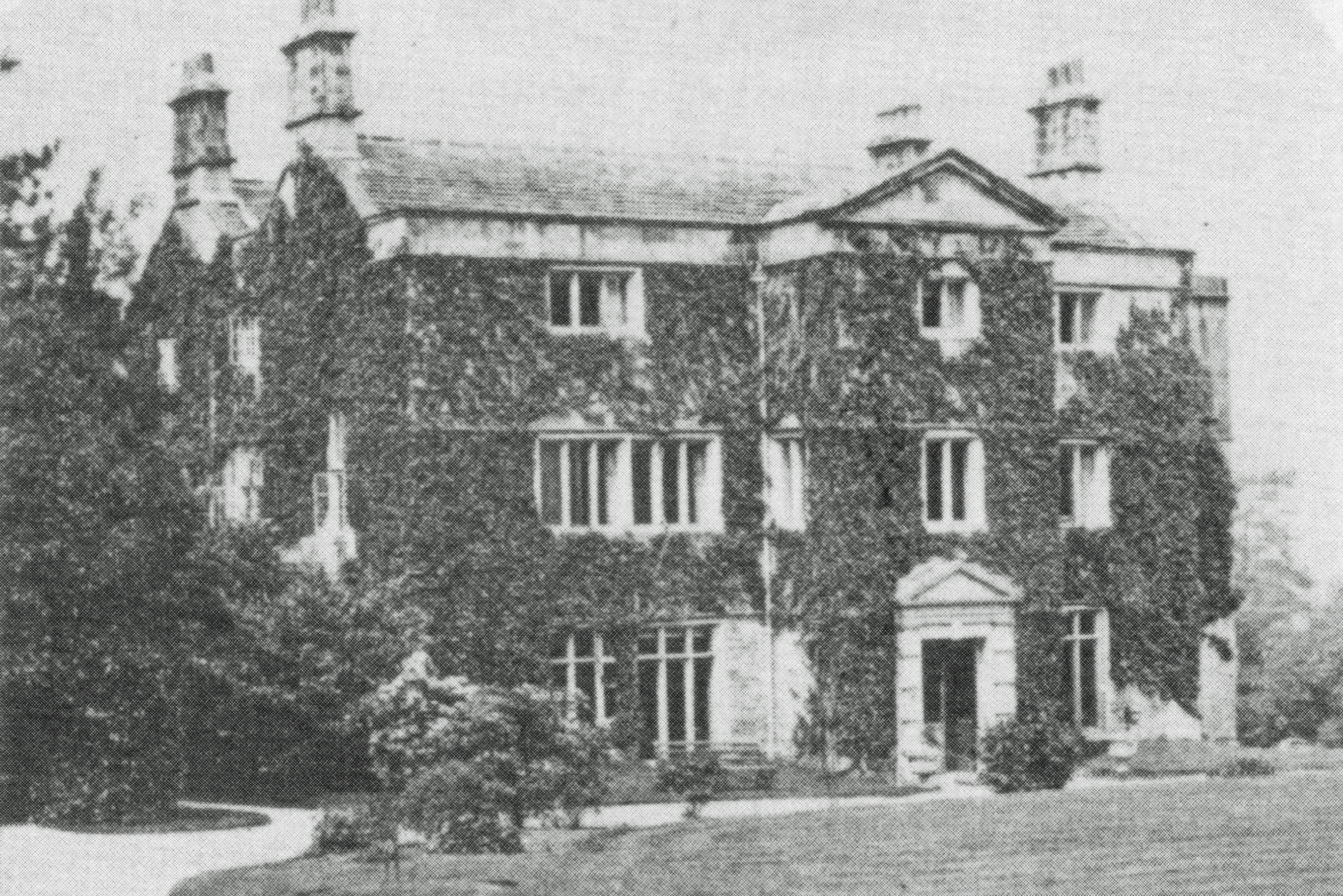
The hall in the 1870s when it was owned by Thomas Gainsford.

Whiteley Wood Hall was an English country house which was demolished in 1959. It stood off Common Lane in the Fulwood area of Sheffield, England. The hall's stables and associated buildings are still standing and along with the surrounding grounds now serve as an outdoor activities centre for Girlguiding Sheffield. The stables are a Grade II listed building.

== History ==
=== Construction ===
Prior to the building of the hall, the land around Whiteley Wood belonged to the Mitchell family. By the time of the reign of Charles I ownership had switched to Thomas Dale and his family. Dale was a substantial freeholder in the Manor of Ecclesall bierlow and he owned a house on the site. Dale had two daughters who were his co-heirs, Anne married John Bright of Banner Cross Hall while Alice married Alexander Ashton of Stoney Middleton on 18 May 1659. It was Alexander Ashton who built Whiteley Wood Hall, it being completed in 1663, by which time he and Alice had two daughters. The Ashton family lineage remained at the hall until 1741 with Sarah Ashton being the last of the family to live there, having married Robert Alsibrook in 1709.

In 1741 the Alsibrooks sold the hall to Strelley Pegge of Beauchief Hall who had been High Sheriff of Derbyshire in 1739. Pegge never lived in the hall but rented it out to various tenants before selling it to Thomas Boulsover, the inventor of Sheffield Plate in 1757. In 1760 Boulsover bought land to the north of the hall on the Porter Brook where he expanded his business by setting up the Wire Mill forge, making saws and edge tools. Boulsover lived at the hall with his wife Hannah, they had ten children but only two, Sarah and Mary survived to adulthood. Boulsover died at the hall on 9 September 1788 aged 84 and due to the failure of the male lineage the hall eventually became the property of Boulsover's granddaughter Barbara Silcock. In 1831 the hall became the property of her daughter Phoebe Silcock who in 1837 donated the land and the sum of £2,200 towards the building of Fulwood church on the other side of the Porter valley. It is said that Phoebe donated that specific piece of land so she could see the church from the hall.

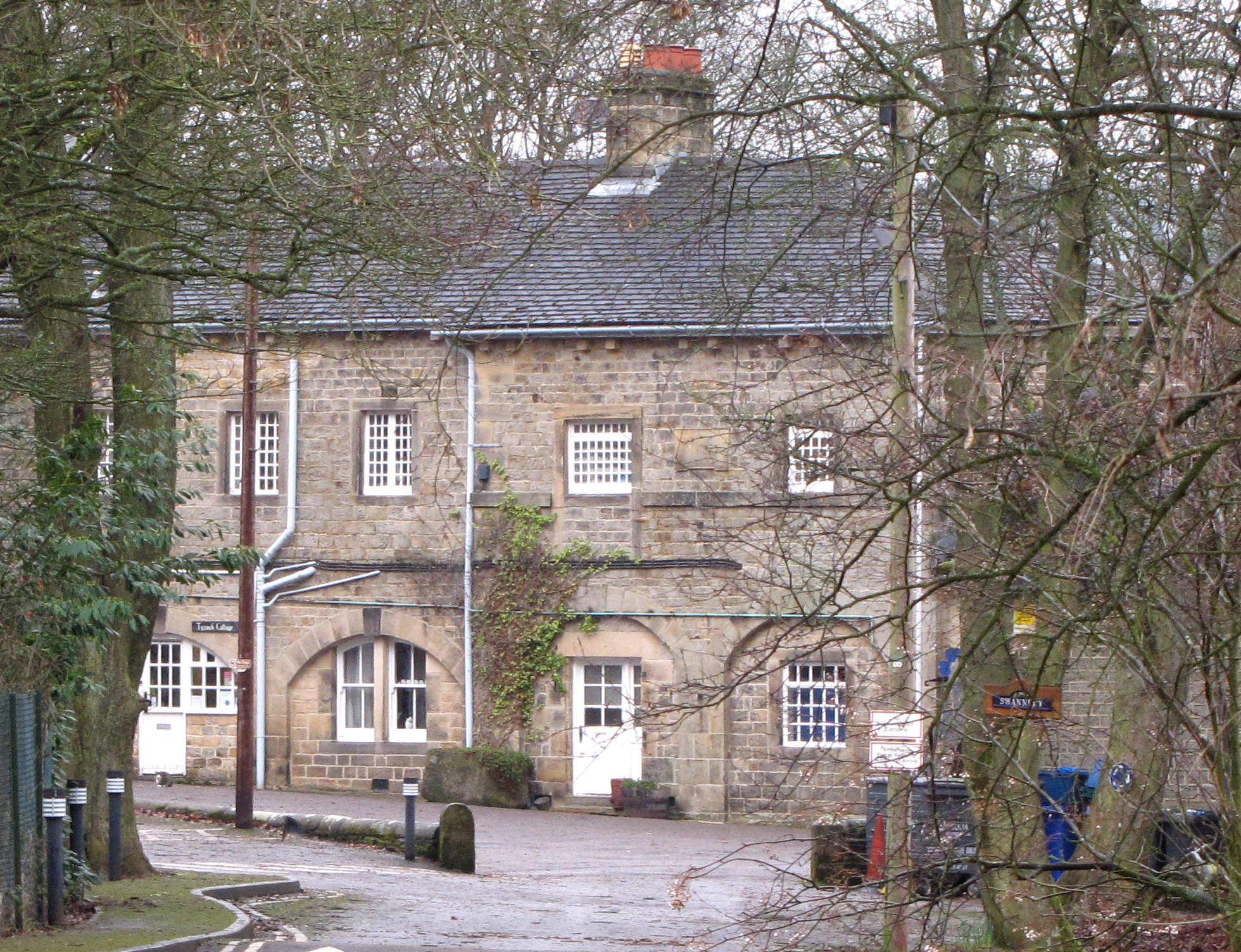
The present day stable block.

On the death of Boulsovers Great Grandson, Benjamin Blonk Silcock in 1861 the hall reverted to the ownership of distant relatives. However, by 1864 the hall was being rented by Samuel Plimsoll and his Sheffield born wife Eliza Ann. Plimsoll became an MP and did much to speed up the passing of the Merchant Shipping Act 1876 (39 & 40 Vict. c. 80) becoming known as "The Sailors Friend". In 1872 the estate consisted of 303 acres between Ringinglow Road and the Porter Brook and at that time was divided into nine lots. Sheffield Corporation purchased the hall in 1896 although the family of Arnold Muir Wilson, the well known Sheffied solicitor, J.P. and City Councillor continued to live there until 1909. Between 1911 and 1926 the hall was rented by William Clark, managing director of the Vickers steel firm. By the end of the 1930s the hall was suffering from neglect and vandalism and in November 1935 it was purchased by the Sheffield Association Of Girl Guides.

=== Demolition ===
The Girl Guides Association paid £3,000 for the hall and eight acres of surrounding land, local industrialist and public benefactor John George Graves loaned £2,500 of the money. The hall continued to fall into a state of disrepair due to lack of funds of the Guides Association, in January 1936 the roof was removed as it was sagging and liable to push the walls out. Demolition of the hall started in May 1959 by James Childs Ltd although the firm had first been asked for a quote in March 1956. The old date stone and gateway were preserved to be incorporated into a memorial which took the form of a flag-staff and saluting base to be used by the Guides. Some of the stone and mullion windows were used to build a bungalow at Hathersage and the rest was disposed of down a disused mineshaft.

== The site today ==
The stables, associated cottages and grounds remain the property of Girlguiding Sheffield, over the years the site has been developed into a multipurpose Outdoor Activity Centre. It includes four camping sites with wet weather shelters, 2 self-catered accommodation blocks, meeting rooms and a shop.
