= Ringinglow =

Village in South Yorkshire, England

Coordinates: 53.3494°N 1.5650°W

- Village
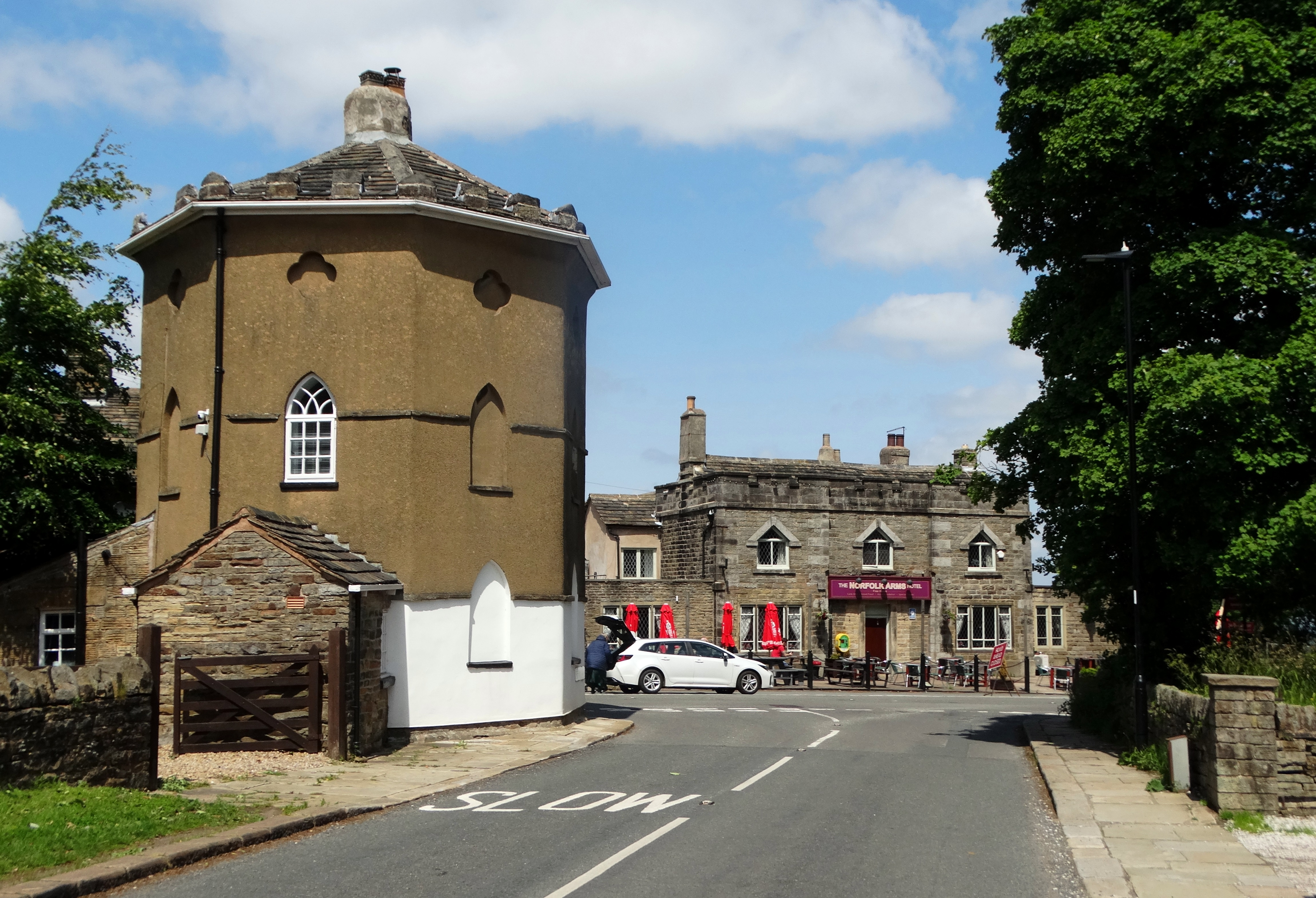
- The Roundhouse

- Location within South Yorkshire
- Metropolitan borough: Sheffield
- Metropolitan county: South Yorkshire
- Region: Yorkshire and the Humber
- Country: England
- Sovereign state: United Kingdom
- Post town: Sheffield
- Postcode district: S11
- Dialling code: 0114
- Police: South Yorkshire
- Fire: South Yorkshire
- Ambulance: Yorkshire
- UK Parliament: Sheffield Hallam

Ringinglow is a village in the west of the Sheffield borough of South Yorkshire, England. Although it is within the boundary of Sheffield, it is self-contained, being entirely surrounded by open countryside.

The village is focussed on the intersections of Fulwood Lane and Sheephill Road (historically this section was known as Houndkirk Road) with Ringinglow Road. The sources of the Porter Brook and Limb Brook, both tributaries of the River Sheaf, are near the village. The Norfolk Arms, a pub in the village, is often used as a staging-post by ramblers following one of these rivers out of Sheffield towards the Peak District National Park, the eastern boundary of which runs through the village. The Peak District Boundary Walk runs through the village.

For elections to Sheffield City Council, since 2015 it has been in the Dore and Totley ward, on its northern boundary with Fulwood. It was previously in Ecclesall ward.

== History ==
On Fulwood Lane a polished Neolithic stone axehead was found in 1952 indicating ancient human activity in the area.

An interim report by University of Sheffield staff on excavations of a linear feature in the Sheephill Road, Ringinglow area has suggested evidence of the route of the lost Roman road linking Templeborough with the Roman signal station at Navio and Batham Gate. The feature, which extends through Barber Fields is 20 metres (66 ft) wide and filled to a depth of 5 metres (16 ft) with rubble and has a metalled surface. This route would have passed close to the Roman Villa at Whirlow Hall Farm.

Historically, the Limb Brook marked the boundary between the Saxon kingdoms of Mercia and Northumbria. This remained the boundary between Yorkshire and Derbyshire into the 20th century. A report dating from 1574 detailed a tour by George Talbot, 6th Earl of Shrewsbury, then lord of the manor of Sheffield, of the boundaries of the manor, in which they visited 'a great heape of stones called Ringinglawe' that was used as one of the boundary markers. The site of the cairn is believed to be to the west of the village. Sheffield historian S. O. Addy, writing in 1888, noted that the Old English word hlâw is almost always used to refer to a burial mound, and speculated that this 'great heap of stones' may have been an ancient barrow. He further suggested that the etymology of the name Ringinglow suggests that 'originally the heap may have been a round burial mound, or mound surrounded by a circle'. Addy additionally noted that there existed a 'folk etymology' for the name Ringinglow — a story also recounted by local historian J. Edward Vickers — that the village got its name after a man lost on the moors in bad weather was saved when he heard the bells of Sheffield parish church 'ringing low' over the moors. Both authors state that this story is a myth.

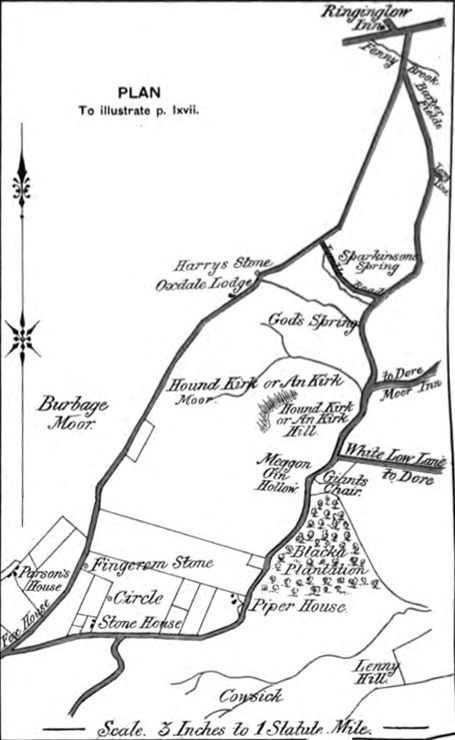
Sidney Oldall Addy's 1888 map, used to illustrate his book on the Sheffield dialect. Limb Brook is shown as Fenny Brook. The Ringinglow Inn is now known as the Norfolk Arms.

Ringinglow Road was constructed as part of a turnpike road from Sheffield to Chapel-en-le-Frith and Buxton that opened in 1758. The grade II listed octagonal former toll house built c. 1778 still stands in the village along with the Norfolk Arms Public House, a coaching inn (also grade II listed) that was built c. 1840. Addy's 1888 map shows the Norfolk Arms was then known as the Ringinglow Inn.

Historical evidence of shallow coal drift-mining of the Ringinglow seam has been found in the nearby Barber Fields, adjacent to Sheephill Road. This was served by an industrial railway which ran from a location near to Furnace Farm to Copperas Farm. Neither of the farm names appear on the modern Ordnance Survey maps although evidence of a ballasted footpath from the Limb Brook to Smeltings Farm can still be found. The railway is known to have existed in the late 1940s but, like the mines is no more. Other mines in the area were the Deep Sick Coal Pits.

In 2005 a Rotary Club funded toposcope, Finder Cairn, was erected at the junction of Fulwood Lane and Greenhouse Lane.

== Popular culture ==
Instrumental tracks titled 'Ringinglow' have been included on The Human League's 2001 album, Secrets, and Roger Eno's 2001 album, Between Tides.
