= Old Sheffield Plate =

Fusion of copper and sterling silver

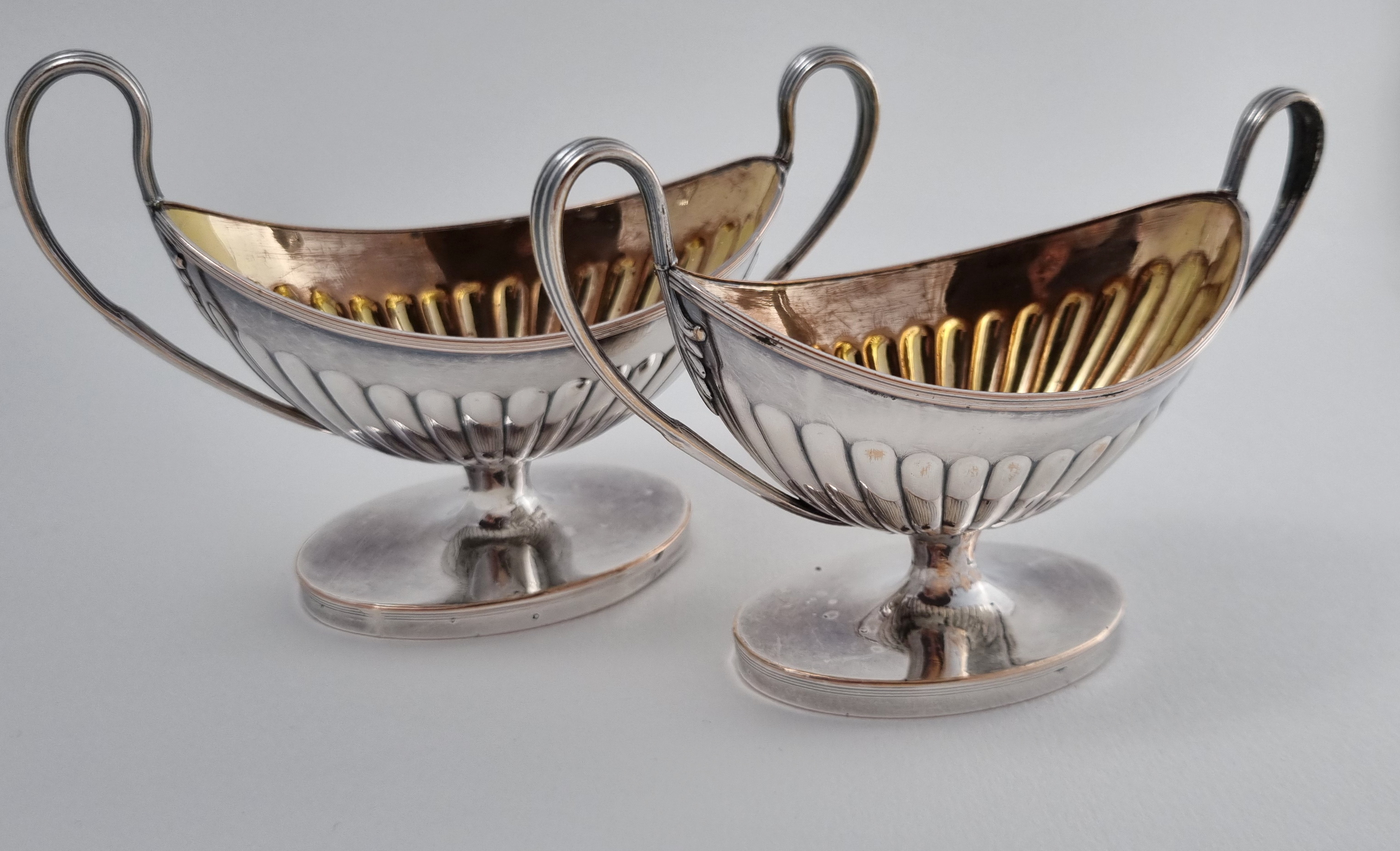
OSP Pair of table salts, the interiors gilded to prevent corrosion. 'Bleeding' of the copper can be seen on the rims.

Old Sheffield Plate (OSP) is the material developed by Thomas Boulsover in the 1740s, a fusion of copper and sterling silver which could be made into a range of items normally made in solid silver. The material rapidly gained popularity as a substitute for solid silver, as it was much cheaper to produce. Any object made in silver could be made in Old Sheffield Plate, although objects subject to heavy wear such as spoons and forks were not so satisfactory in plate.

The characteristic identifying feature of OSP is the 'bleeding' or 'show through' of the copper base, especially on points of wear. There is also a subtle difference in colour between the pure silver of electroplating and the "very faintly bluish lustre" of OSP. In addition to having a distinct bluish cast, the alloy produced in OSP is also harder than electrodeposited silver. The material remained popular until being replaced by the electroplate process in the 1840s.

Items produced in Old Sheffield Plate included buttons, caddy spoons, fish slices, serving utensils, candlesticks and other lighting devices, coffee and tea sets, serving dishes and trays, tankards and pitchers and larger items such as soup tureens and hot-water urns.

'Old Sheffield Plate' with all three words capitalised is the accepted term in the antiques trade for this material. The expression 'Sheffield plate' and all variations thereof are generic terms which may apply to any product of silver appearance made in Sheffield, UK.

== History ==
=== Boulsover's discovery ===
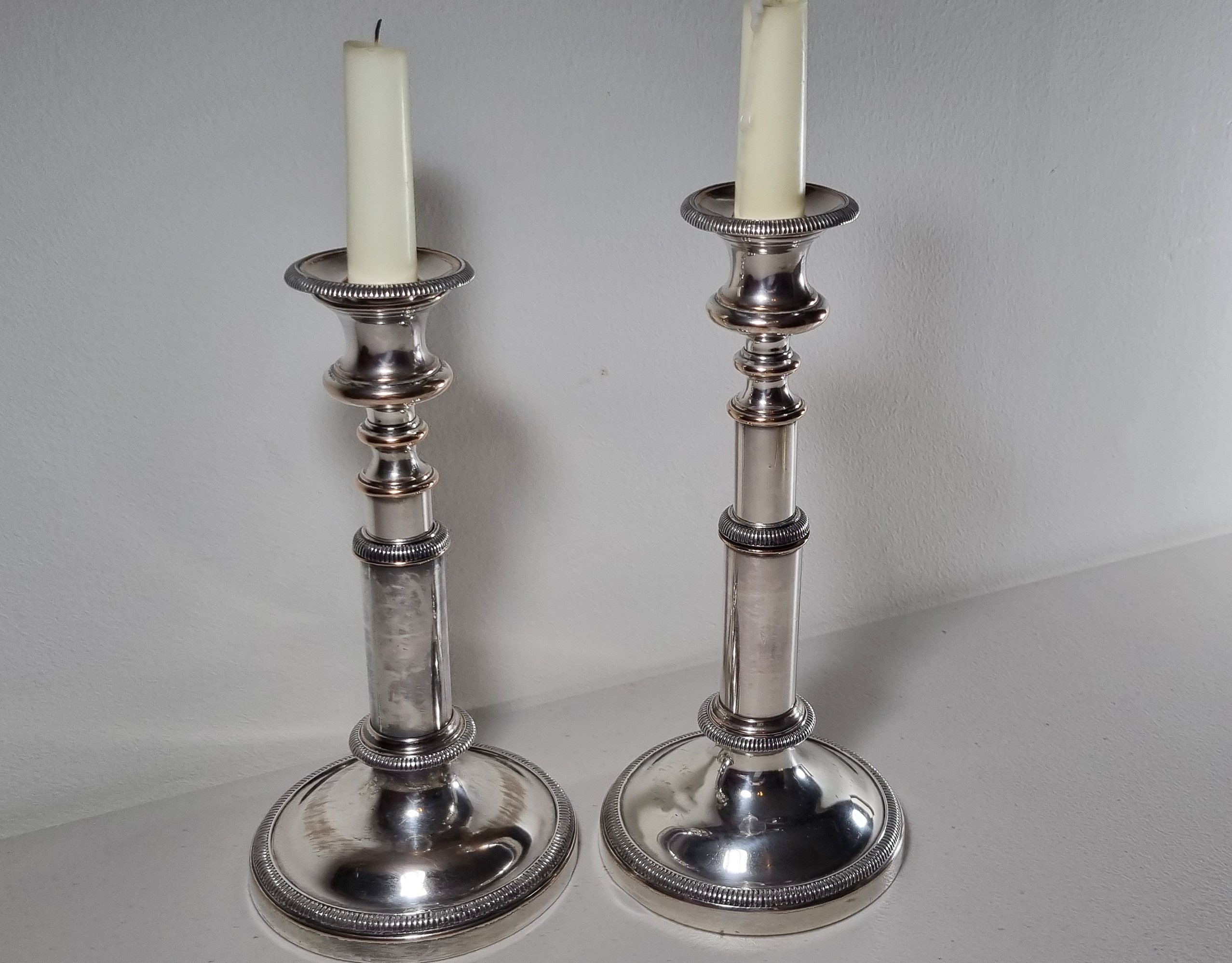
OSP 'Telescopic' candlesticks, c. 1830, with the 'Orb' Maker's Mark of Blagden, Hodgson & Co. The inner sleeve allowed the height of the candle to be adjusted.

The fact that silver and copper could fuse together was almost certainly well known to Sheffield silver makers, as silver based solder (an alloy of silver, copper and zinc) was widely used. Boulsover's discovery or invention was to find that sheets of silver and copper under high pressure would fuse together when heated to the melting point of the silver-copper eutectic alloy, then could be rolled out and shaped without the layers separating. The material could be rolled out to a thinness appropriate for the making of silver items. As far less silver was needed, the price of these items was far lower.

The material was invented by Thomas Boulsover, of Sheffield's Cutlers Company. It was said that while trying to repair the handle of a customer's decorative knife, he heated it too much and the silver started to melt. When he examined the damaged handle, he noticed that the silver and copper had fused together very strongly. Experiments showed that the two metals behaved as one when he tried to reshape them, even though he could clearly see the two different layers. Although it was certainly Boulsover who discovered the commercial viability of fusion, it is unlikely that the accidental discovery is any more than an anecdote.

Boulsover set up in business and carried out further experiments in which he put a thin sheet of silver on a thick ingot of copper and heated the two together to fuse them. When the composite block was hammered or rolled to make it thinner, the two metals were reduced in thickness at similar rates. Using this method, Boulsover was able to make sheets of metal which had a thin layer of silver on the top surface and a thick layer of copper underneath. When this new material was used to make buttons, they looked and behaved like silver buttons but were a fraction of the cost.

=== Two cities ===
The main centre for the trade was always Sheffield, England, where there was already a substantial manufacturing industry for making small silver items such as buttons, cutlery and snuff boxes etc. Following Boulsover's discovery, the trade rapidly expanded particularly from the 1760s onwards. The other centre of production in England became Birmingham, almost entirely through the efforts of Matthew Boulton. While Boulton's ormolu and solid silver products tend to attract most attention, his button and plated wares manufacturing were financially always more important.

=== Later practice ===
Following the introduction and adoption of German silver (60% copper, 20% nickel and 20% zinc), around 1820, it was found that this new material also fused well with sheet silver and provided a more suitable base metal for the Sheffield process. Because of its nearly silver colour, German silver also revealed less wear, or "bleeding", when Sheffield-made articles were subject to daily use and polishing. Being much harder than copper, it was used from the mid-1830s but only for articles such as trays or cylindrical items that did not require complex shaping.

After about 1840 the Sheffield plate process was generally replaced with electroplating processes, such as that of George Elkington. Electroplating tends to produce a "brilliant" surface with a hard colour – as it consists of pure rather than sterling silver and is usually deposited more thinly. Sheffield plate continued to be used for up to a further 100 years for silver-plated articles subject to heavy wear, most commonly uniform buttons and tankards. During the 1840–1850 period, hybrid articles such as sugar bowls were produced, with the body being Old Sheffield Plate and complicated small parts such as the feet and handles made from electroplate. These are rare and seldom recognised. The Sheffield plating process is not often used today. During the Second World War, a process analogous to Sheffield plating was used to build intercoolers for Rolls-Royce Merlin engines to overcome problems with thermal fracturing.

== Techniques ==
=== Double plating ===
Double plating or sometimes the 'double sandwich' form of Sheffield plate was developed around 1770. Used for pieces such as bowls and mugs that had a visible interior, it consisted of a sheet of silver each side of a piece of copper; early manufacturers applied a film of solder over the bare edge of copper although such pieces are very rare. Edges of early salvers were hidden by folding them over but from about 1790, borders were applied with U-shaped lengths of silver wire to conceal the copper which can often be felt as a lip on the underside. Towards the end of the period, solid wire was sometimes used which can be hard to see.

=== Die stamping, plated wire and other techniques ===
The whole process of OSP manufacture was complex and involved a number of techniques. Die stamping was used extensively for shaping the basic sheets of OSP and also for forming small parts such as feet and handles. The manufacture of plated wire was another important technique, involving coating a circular rod of copper with silver. This could then be 'drawn out' to produce not only circular wire but also various profiles, such as the arms of candelabra. Plated wire was used extensively for items such as cake baskets, but also for finishing the edges of items such as snuffer trays by creating U-shaped sections which could cover the bare copper edges. A further technique allowed gadrooned edging to be created. Pierced work was very common, again methods were developed to conceal the bare edges of the copper.

== Replating and recognition ==
Much Old Sheffield Plate seen today has been re-plated, especially items which received much use and polishing, such as candlesticks. Items seldom displayed or used, such as egg cruets or soufflé dishes, are often in excellent condition and so may be confused with electroplate. Collectors should be aware that many designs have been reproduced in electroplate, with those from the early 1900s being the hardest to recognise since, like the original items, they seldom have a maker's mark. The way to recognise the genuine article is to look for signs that it was soldered from pre-plated metal sheet or wire rather than constructed in base metal and plated afterwards. Soldered joints, often well-disguised by the experts of the time, are also a hallmark of Sheffield plate.

== Terminology ==
The term Sheffield plate is widely used by those dealing in electroplate produced in Sheffield, and most collectors prefer to use the term Old Sheffield Plate to identify the early fused plate product. Close Plated ware consists of silver foil soldered onto a steel base and was used for items such as candle snuffers or cutlery requiring greater strength than fused plate. It was produced from the eighteenth to the twentieth century.

== Sources and further reading ==
- Old Sheffield Plate, A History of the 18th Century Plated Trade, Gordon Crosskey. 1st edition 2011, 2nd edition 2013. The most important volume to appear in many years, a thoroughly researched work with much detail on the main producers and numerous excellent colour illustrations. It stops at 1810, while the trade continued until the 1840s.
- The Price Guide to Old Sheffield Plate, T. W. Frost, 1971. An Antique Collectors’ Club price guide, prices out of date, but with a large number of illustrations and comment. The image quality of the printing is not of a high standard.
- Matthew Boulton, Selling what all the world desires, Shena Mason, Ed., 2009. Major work covering all Boulton’s activities. Chapter 5 by Kenneth Quickenden describes Boulton’s Silver and Sheffield Plate trade, as well as other references elsewhere in the text. Produced in association with the Matthew Boulton Bicentenary Exhibition.
- Understanding Antique Silver Plate, Stephen J. Helliwell, 1996. Large section on Old Sheffield Plate and also a similar length of description of Electroplate, with shorter notes on techniques such as Close Plating.
- History of Old Sheffield Plate, Being an Account of the Origin, Growth, and Decay of the Industry etc etc, Frederick Bradbury, 1912. Although published in the early 20th Century, Bradbury is still a valuable source of information, as he was the owner of a plate making company hence directly involved in the trade. Particularly valuable for the lists of OSP Makers Marks.
- Old Sheffield Plate Shire Album 222, 1988. Concise guide to OSP with numerous illustrations, authored by Anneke Bambery, a former Keeper of Applied Art at Sheffield City Museum which holds an extensive collection of OSP, including the Bradbury collection.

== See also ==
- Electroplating
- German silver
- Mokume-gane
- Plated ware
- Plating
