= Mylnhurst =

Country house in Sheffield, South Yorkshire, England

Coordinates: 53.35167°N 1.509043°W

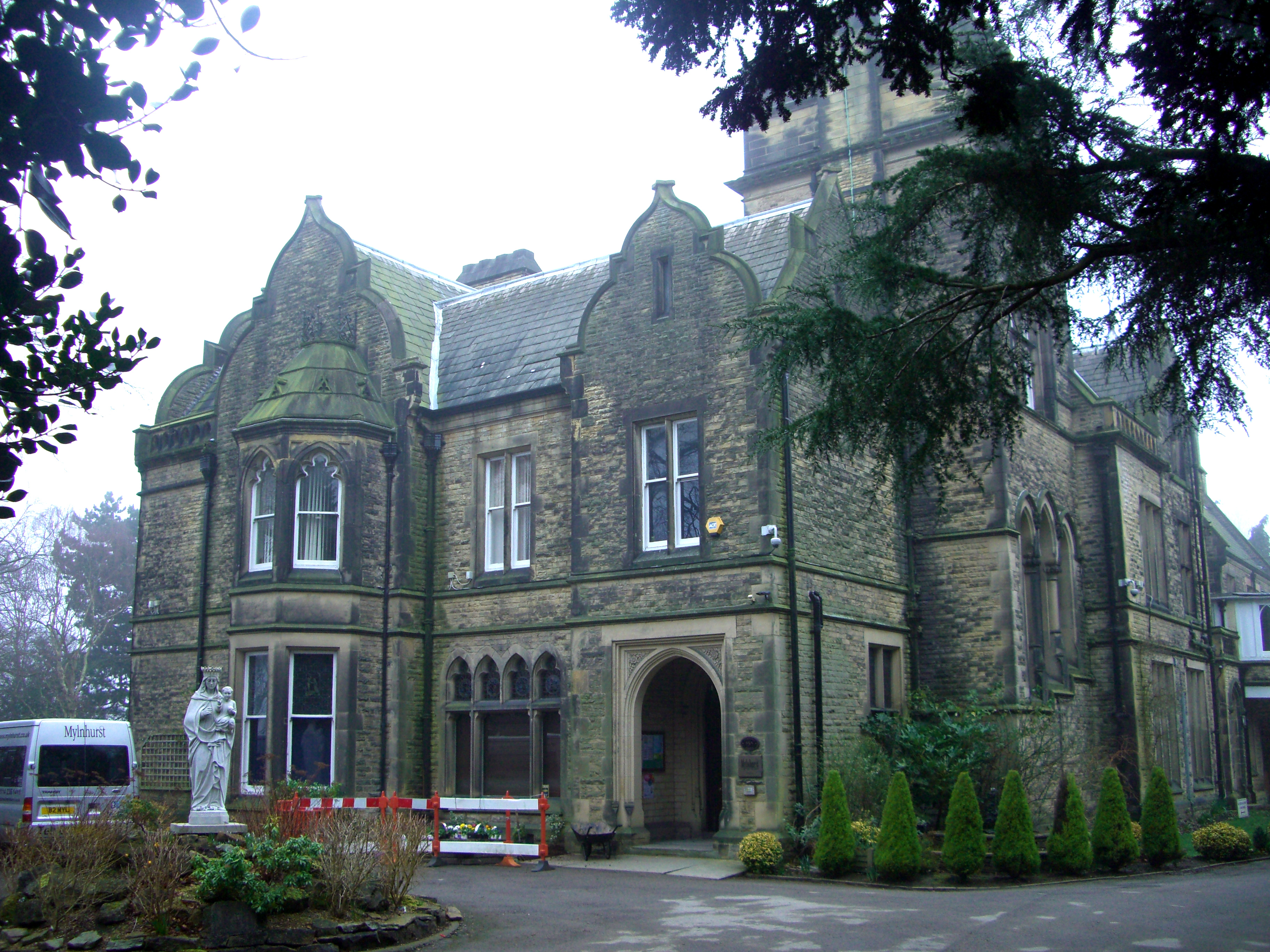

Mylnhurst is a small English country house on Button Hill in the Ecclesall area of Sheffield, England. The house was previously a private residence, it now serves as a private school. The house along with the attached stables and lodge are Grade II listed buildings.

== History ==
=== Private house ===
Mylnhurst was built in 1883 for Major William Greaves Blake. Blake had served in the 6th Dragoon Guards and as a lieutenant had been awarded the Indian Mutiny Medal for his part in suppressing that uprising in 1857. When Mylnhurst was constructed it stood in an isolated rural situation consisting of open farmland interspersed with pockets of woodland. The Greaves Blake's nearest neighbour was Henry Vickers, the Lord Mayor of Sheffield in 1860, who lived at Holmwood 500 metres to the SW overlooking Ecclesall Woods. After the death of his first wife, William Greaves Blake married Rebecca Jessop in 1869, the daughter of Thomas Jessop steel maker and founder of Jessop Hospital and they moved into Mylnhurst in 1883.

Mylnhurst was constructed in the neo gothic style, it cost £14,000, a considerable amount at the time, the house was large for a family home, but the Greaves Blakes needed the space as they had twelve children. Mylnhurst was renowned for its large beautiful gardens, with lake, Japanese garden, greenhouses and vinery. The early part of the 1900s saw a considerable parcel of land sold off to create the housing on Button Hill and Millhouses Lane, the lake was filled in at this time. In 1908 Major Greaves Blake's son Philip married Dorothy Barbour and they were given a piece of Mylnhurst land to construct their own home, known as Button Hill House at 1 Woodholm Road.

Major Greaves Blake died in 1904 but his widow Rebecca continued living at Mylnhurst until her death in 1920 when the house was sold to W.J. Walsh owner of the John Walsh department store on High Street in central Sheffield.

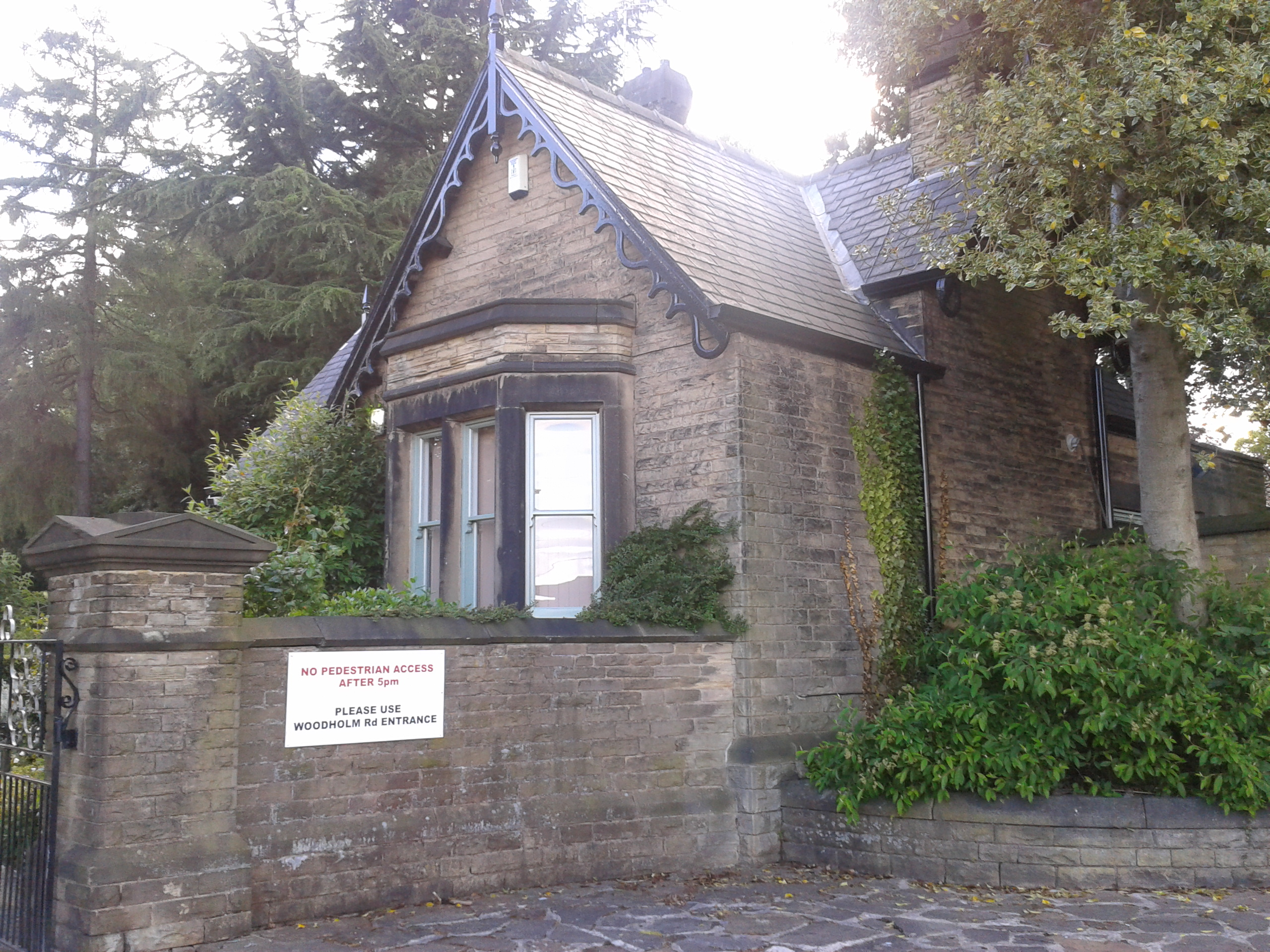
The lodge and gateway.

=== Catholic school ===
When the Walsh family moved to a house at Ranmoor in 1933 Mylnhurst was sold to the Sisters of Mercy for use as a school to cater for the Catholic community of Ecclesall. The adjacent Button Hill House was sold to the Sisters in 1936 and was used as a boarding house for Mylnhurst pupils, it later became known as St Gerards and housed novitiates, afterwards it was used as university lodgings before being demolished to make way for bungalows on Woodholm Road. The school began with seven pupils when it first opened and was known as Mylnhurst High School, changing later to Mylnhurst Convent School. By 1935 there were 96 pupils including 10 boarders and the old billiards room had been converted into a dining room.

=== New chapel added ===
In June 1962 a chapel was added to the building, designed by local architect John Rochford and opened by Bishop George Dwyer.

== Architecture ==
Mylnhurst is constructed from course squared stone with a slate roof which has multiple ridge stacks upon it, however the very tall chimney stacks were removed after being damaged in a gale in 1962. The house has much ornate stonework including elaborately carved pillars which support an oriel window on the south front of the house. There is a castellated tower integrated into the building on the north side. The two storey stable block on the north side has an archway and oriel window. The highlight of the interior is the ground floor front room which has a cross beam ceiling, moulded cornice, wooden fireplace and overdoor dating from around 1900.

== Present day ==
Today the building houses the Mylnhurst Preparatory School and Nursery, although it is a Catholic Foundation it welcomes all faiths. The grounds have been utilised for school use and include facilities such as an indoor sports hall, dance studio, 25 metre swimming pool, outdoor sports fields and play areas.
