= Wilson Road Synagogue =

Former Orthodox synagogue in Sheffield, England

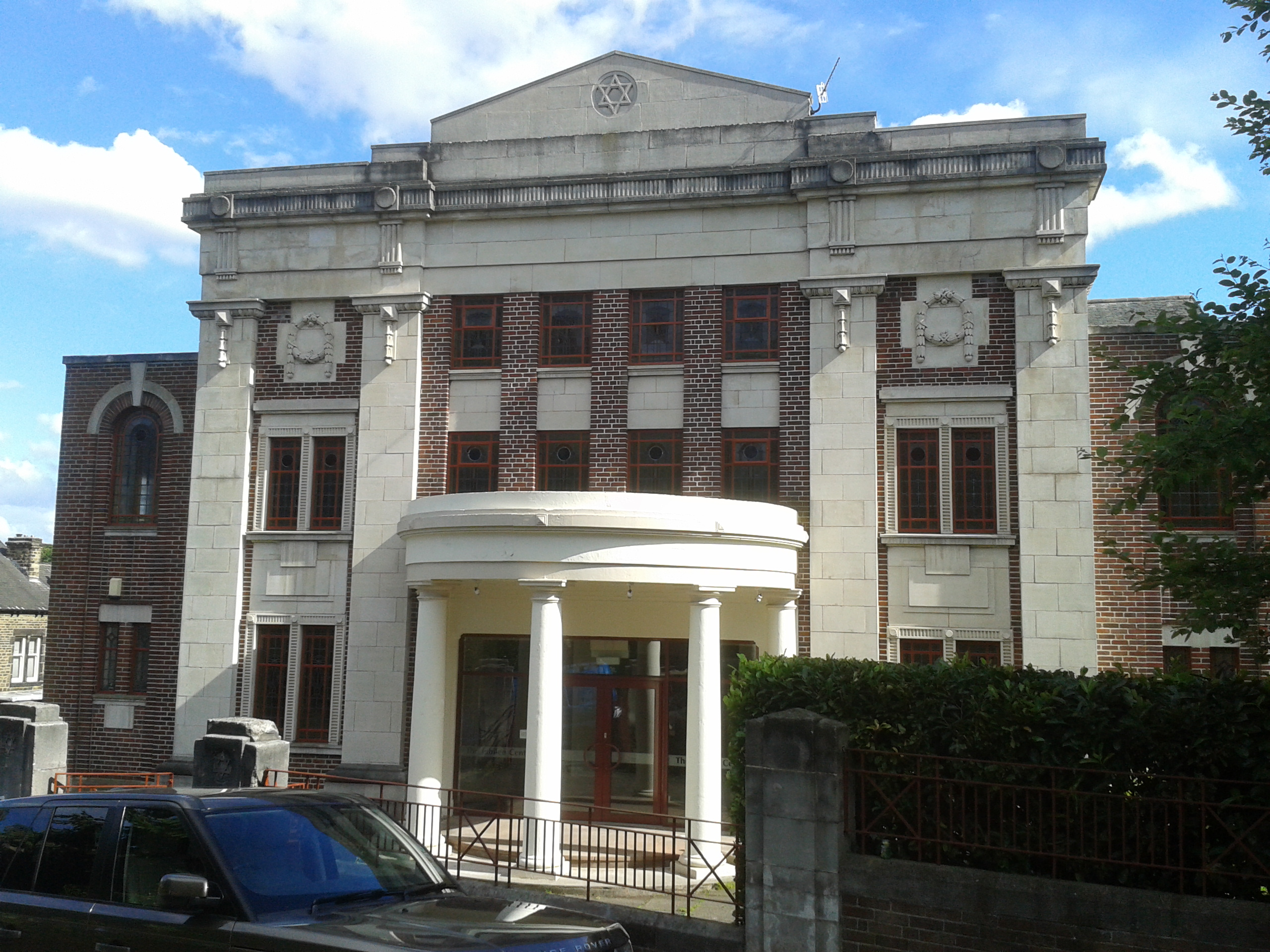
- Façade of the former synagogue

- Location of the former synagogue in Sheffield

Religion
- Affiliation: Orthodox Judaism (former)
- Rite: Nusach Ashkenaz
- Ecclesiastical or organizational status: Synagogue (1930–1997); Church (since 2000)

Location
- Location: 11 Wilson Road, Ecclesall, Sheffield, England S11 8RN
- Country: United Kingdom
- Interactive map of Wilson Road Synagogue
- Coordinates: 53°22′11″N 1°29′56″W

Architecture
- Architect: Mansell Jenkinson
- Type: Synagogue architecture
- Style: Neo-classical
- Established: 1914 (as a congregation)
- Completed: 1930
- Capacity: 970 worshipers

Listed Building – Grade II
- Official name: Synagogue, Wilson Road
- Type: Listed building
- Designated: 11 February 1992
- Reference no.: 1270715

Listed Building – Grade II
- Official name: Succah 2 metres south west of synagogue
- Type: Listed building
- Designated: 11 February 1992
- Reference no.: 1254575

Listed Building – Grade II
- Official name: Boundary wall and gates to synagogue, Wilson Road
- Type: Listed building
- Designated: 11 February 1992
- Reference no.: 1067334

The Wilson Road Synagogue is a former Orthodox Jewish congregation and synagogue, located at 11 Wilson Road, Ecclesall, Sheffield, England, in the United Kingdom. The congregation was formed in 1914 and worshiped in the Ashkenazi rite until the congregation was dissolved in 1997.

The building has been used as a church since 2000.

== History ==
Sheffield had a Jewish population from the 1780s, and its first synagogue was built in 1851 on Fig Tree Lane in the city centre. However, communal disputes led to a second congregation being established on North Church Street in 1914. This group constructed a synagogue on Wilson Road, near Hunters Bar, in 1930.

The building was designed by Mansell Jenkinson in a Neo-classical style, featuring a portico in the Doric order. It is built of brick, with faience dressings, and also has notable internal features, including a granite ark, choir gallery and hardwood pews. The sukkah is in a neighbouring building, designed so that its flat roof can be slid open.

During World War II, the city centre synagogue was destroyed by bombing, and much of its community came to worship at Wilson Road. However, they later established a new building, Kingfield Hall, in Nether Edge. The Jewish population of the city reached about 1,500 in the 1950s, but then entered a long decline. In the 1960s, the two communities joined together, and in 2000, the resulting independent congregation moved to a new building at the Kingfield Hall site. The Wilson Road Synagogue was subsequently converted into a church.

The synagogue, sukkah, and adjacent boundary wall and gates were listed as Grade II buildings in 1992.

== See also ==
- History of the Jews in England
- List of former synagogues in the United Kingdom

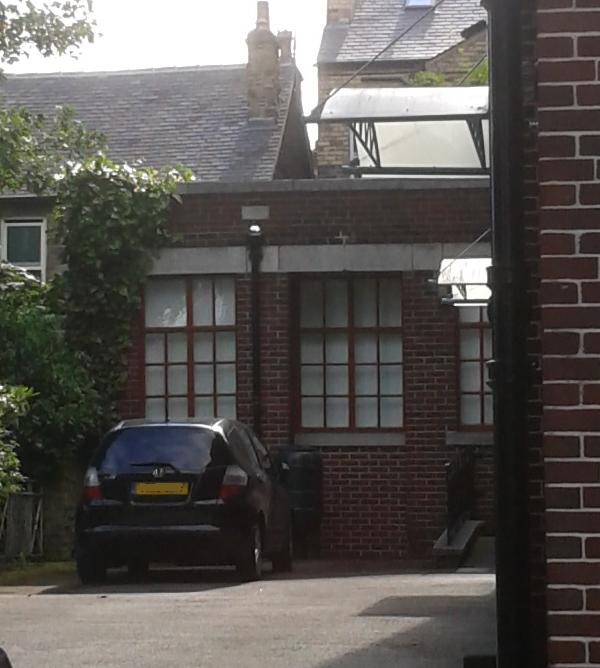
Sukkah, with roof part-open
