= Banner Cross Hall =

Country house in Sheffield, England

Coordinates: 53.3576°N 1.5088°W

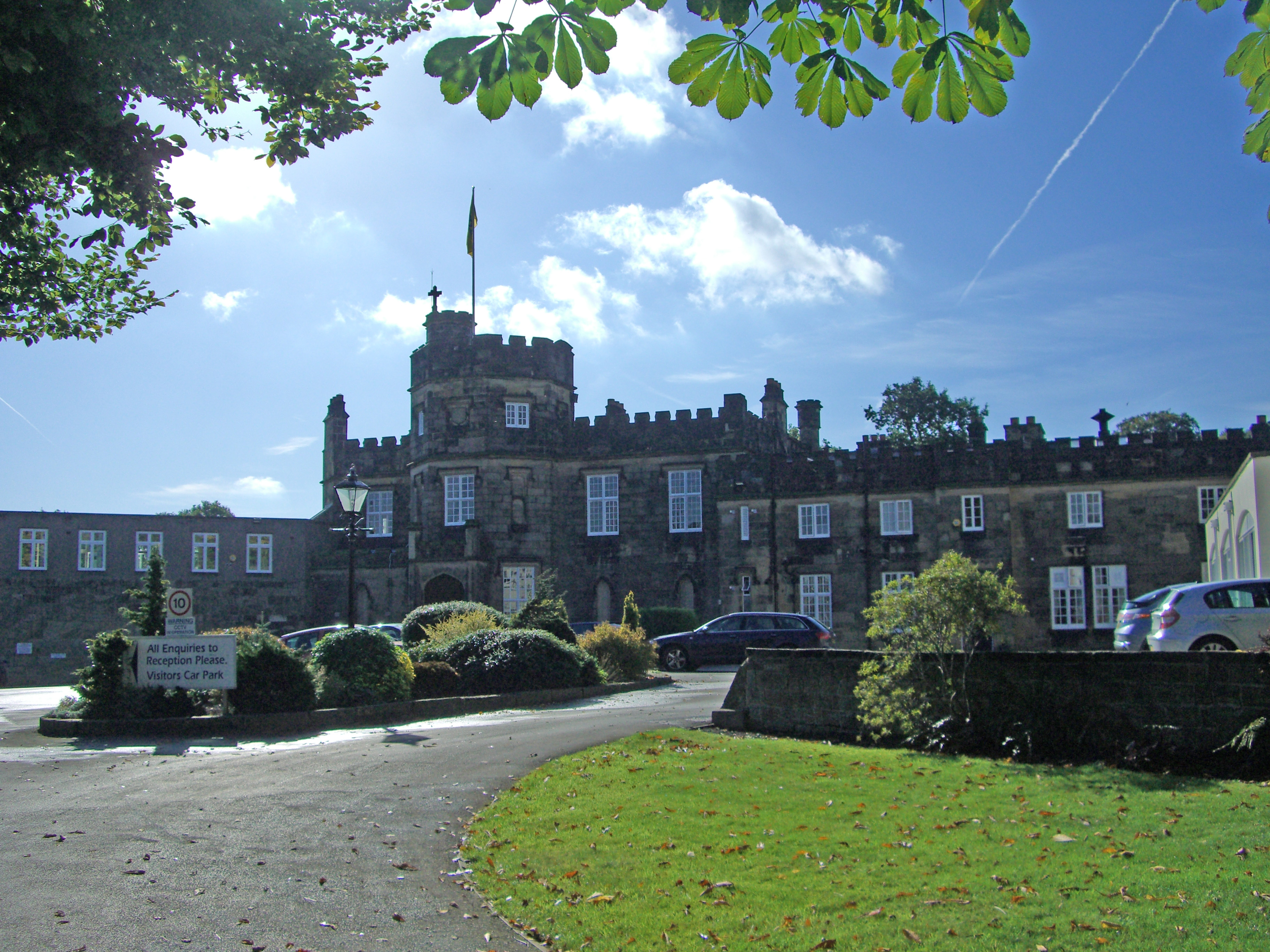
- Interactive map of the Banner Cross Hall area

General information
- Type: Country house
- Architectural style: Tudor Gothic
- Classification: Grade II
- Location: Ecclesall Road South, Banner Cross, United Kingdom
- Opened: 1821

Technical details
- Material: Ashlar
- Floor count: 3

Banner Cross Hall is an English country house situated on Ecclesall Road South in the Banner Cross area of Sheffield, England. The hall is a Grade II listed building which was until 2023 the main headquarters of Henry Boot PLC, the Sheffield-based property and construction company. In 2025 a planning application was submitted to transform the building into a special educational needs school.

== History ==
The present day Banner Cross Hall dates from 1821, however an Elizabethan mansion was located on the site prior to this. This was one of the seats of the Bright family of Whirlow, who owned much land and property in the Sheffield area at the time and had connections with Carbrook Hall and Whirlow Hall. The Bright family became extinct in 1748 upon the death of John Bright of Chesterfield in February of that year and the ensuing death of his grandson and heir Bright Dalton later that year. Banner Cross Hall was then conveyed by John Bright’s granddaughter and heiress Mary Dalton to her husband Lord John Murray, Colonel of the 42nd Regiment of Foot and Aide-de-Camp to King George II.

The Murray family started off by landscaping the grounds, planting much woodland and creating a kitchen garden, when the Hall was inherited by Lt. General William Murray he employed Jeffry Wyattville to completely refashion the house between 1817 and 1821. The result of Wyattville’s work was an ingenious grouping of gables and turrets which gives the illusion of the hall being much larger than it actually is. The city of Sheffield expanded and surrounded the hall and it lost its rural seclusion. Some of the roads in the area of the hall reflect the Murray’s ownership of the land, for example: Blair Atholl Road, Tullibardine Road, Huntingtower Road and Dunkeld Road. The hall passed to the Greaves Bagshawes of Ford Hall, Chapel-en-le-Frith in the second half of the 19th century and was then rented out. In 1900 the tenant was Douglas Vickers J.P. a member of the eminent Sheffield engineering family Vickers.

In 1932 the house was purchased by Henry Boot PLC, a Sheffield-based construction company and has been used as their headquarters right up to 2023.

== Architecture ==
The hall is constructed from ashlar with a hipped slate roofs in the Tudor Gothic style. The highlights of the exterior are the three storey tower porch which has a crenellated turret. The crenellations are continued right round the hall and are an eye-catching feature. The roof has eight significant chimney stacks. The interior has Tudor arched doorways and moulded cornices. The octagonal entrance hall has a Tudor arched fireplace and enriched plaster wall panels.
