= Listed buildings in Sheffield S2 =

The S2 district lies within the City of Sheffield, South Yorkshire, England. The district contains 69 listed buildings that are recorded in the National Heritage List for England. Of these, four are listed at Grade II*, the middle grade, and the others are at Grade II, the lowest grade. The district is in the east of the city of Sheffield, and covers the areas of Arbourthorne, Highfield, Hyde Park, Manor, Norfolk Park, Park Hill, Wybourn and part of Heeley.

For neighbouring areas, see listed buildings in Sheffield City Centre, listed buildings in S4, listed buildings in S7, listed buildings in S8, listed buildings in S9, listed buildings in S12, listed buildings in S13 and listed buildings in S14.

== Key ==
Grade	Criteria
II*	Particularly important buildings of more than special interest
II	Buildings of national importance and special interest

== Buildings ==
Name and location	Street	Photograph	Date	Notes	Grade
Sheffield Manor Ruins; 53.37422°N 1.43662°W	Manor Lane		About 1510		II
Sheffield Manor Turret House; 53.37386°N 1.43797°W	Manor Lane		About 1574		II*
Heeley Cruck Barn; 53.36078°N 1.46960°W	Wilson Place		About 1600		II
The Albion; 53.37117°N 1.47711°W	London Road		Late 18th century		II
Ruin east of Sheffield Manor; 53.37420°N 1.43530°W	Manor Lane		Late 18th century		II
11–17 St Barnabas Road; 53.36716°N 1.47474°W	St Barnabas Road		Late 18th century		II
Sheaf House; 53.36759°N 1.47071°W	Bramall Lane		About 1800		II
White Lion; 53.36006°N 1.47344°W	London Road		About 1800		II
Shrewsbury Hospital; 53.37733°N 1.45689°W	Norfolk Road		1825	Designed by Woodhead and Hurst	II
Shrewsbury Hospital Lodges and Gateways; 53.37761°N 1.45668°W	Norfolk Road		1825	Designed by Woodhead and Hurst	II
Heeley Institute; 53.36061°N 1.46860°W	Gleadless Road		1826		II
Beech Hill; 53.37146°N 1.45778°W	Norfolk Park Road		About 1830	Designed by Woodhead & Hirst	II
St Mary's; 53.37245°N 1.47168°W	Bramall Lane		1830	Designed by Joseph and Robert Potter	II*
Cholera Monument; 53.37578°N 1.45921°W	Norfolk Road		1835	Designed by Matthew Ellison Hadfield	II
St John the Evangelist; 53.38385°N 1.45388°W	Bernard Road		1838	Designed by Matthew Ellison Hadfield	II
Queen's Tower; 53.36820°N 1.45722°W	Park Grange Road		1839		II
Queen's Tower Lodge and Walls; 53.36826°N 1.45973°W	East Bank Road		1839		II
Queen's Tower Service Wing and Cottage; 53.36855°N 1.45702°W	Park Grange Road		1839		II
Queen's Tower Stable Court; 53.36840°N 1.45622°W	Park Grange Road		1839		II
Queen's Tower Terrace Wall, Gateway and Stair; 53.36805°N 1.45731°W	Park Grange Road		1839		II
Arbourthorne Cottages (NE); 53.36722°N 1.44736°W	St Aidan's Avenue		About 1841		II
Arbourthorne Cottages (SW); 53.36702°N 1.44770°W	St Aidan's Avenue		About 1841		II
Norfolk Park Entrance Lodge; 53.37328°N 1.44988°W	Granville Road		1841		II
Norfolk Park West Lodge; 53.37197°N 1.45684°W	Norfolk Park Road		1841		II
Norfolk Park West Lodge Gateway and Wall; 53.37182°N 1.45711°W	Norfolk Park Road		1841		II
Christ Church, Heeley; 53.36072°N 1.46779°W	Gleadless Road		1848	Designed by Joseph Mitchell	II
Christ Church Wall and Gates; 53.36034°N 1.46793°W	Gleadless Road		1848		II
Columbia Place; 53.37561°N 1.46398°W	Suffolk Road		About 1849		II
19 Shrewsbury Road; 53.37682°N 1.46048°W	Shrewsbury Road		About 1850		II
Wharf House; 53.38421°N 1.46016°W	Wharf Street		About 1850		II
John Shortridge Memorial; 53.36042°N 1.46764°W	Gleadless Road		1869	Within Christ Church graveyard	II
Lowfield School; 53.36451°N 1.47216°W	London Road		1874	Designed by Innocent and Brown	II
Lowfield School Walls, Railings and Gates; 53.36402°N 1.47221°W	London Road		1874	Designed by Innocent and Brown	II
Kenilworth Works; 53.37099°N 1.47547°W	Boston Street		Late 19th century		II
Murray Building; 53.37199°N 1.47471°W	Boston Street		Late 19th century		II
Nunnery Station Horses Sick Bay; 53.38521°N 1.45012°W	Bernard Road		Late 19th century		II
Sewer Gas Lamp; 53.36873°N 1.47610°W	Alderson Road		Late 19th century	At junction with London Road	II
Sewer Gas Lamp; 53.36938°N 1.46826°W	Lancing Road		Late 19th century	At junction with Cherry Street	II
Wardonia Works; 53.37163°N 1.47115°W	Clough Road		Late 19th century		II
Highfield Library; 53.36690°N 1.47468°W	London Road		1876	Designed by E. Mitchell Gibbs	II
Lamp Standard; 53.37354°N 1.45018°W	Granville Road		About 1876	At entrance to Norfolk Park	II
Manor Lodge School; 53.37313°N 1.44337°W	City Road		1876	Designed by Innocent and Brown	II
Norfolk Park Gateway and Walls; 53.37332°N 1.45016°W	Granville Road		About 1876		II
St Barnabas House; 53.36675°N 1.47428°W	Highfield Place		1876	Designed by Flockton & Abbot	II
Lowfield School Rear Range; 53.36441°N 1.47172°W	London Road		1877	Designed by Innocent and Brown	II
Portland Works; 53.36995°N 1.47415°W	Randall Street		1877		II*
Edmund Road Drill Hall Bollards and Kerb; 53.37216°N 1.46713°W	Edmund Road		1878		II
City Road Cemetery Gatehouse, Offices and Walls; 53.36938°N 1.44100°W	City Road		1879	Designed by Matthew Hadfield and Son	II
Edmund Road Drill Hall; 53.37186°N 1.46723°W	Edmund Road		1879	Designed by Matthew Ellison Hadfield	II
Highfield Trinity Church; 53.36628°N 1.47409°W	London Road		1879	Designed by John Dodsley Webster	II
Heeley Bank Community Centre and School; 53.36175°N 1.46308°W	Heeley Bank Road		1880	Designed by Edward Robert Robson	II
Heeley Bank Community Centre Wall, Railing and Gates; 53.36177°N 1.46329°W	Heeley Bank Road		1880	Designed by Edward Robert Robson	II
Stag Works; 53.37047°N 1.47414°W	John Street		About 1880		II
City Road Cemetery Crematorium and Chapels; 53.36898°N 1.43949°W	City Road		1881	Designed by Matthew Hadfield and Son	II
City Road Cemetery North West Lodge, Gateway and Wall; 53.37237°N 1.43829°W	City Road		1881	Designed by Matthew Hadfield and Son	II
Anns Road Schools; 53.36143°N 1.46868°W	Anns Road		1890	Designed by C. J. Innocent	II
Nunnery Station Boundary Wall and Gateway; 53.38532°N 1.45025°W	Bernard Road		About 1890		II
Chinese Christian Church; 53.36157°N 1.46932°W	Anns Road		1896		II
Victoria Methodist Church; 53.37594°N 1.45208°W	Stafford Road		1899		II
Victoria Methodist Church Wall, Gates and Railing; 53.37584°N 1.45234°W	Stafford Road		1899		II
City Road Cemetery Roman Catholic Chapel; 53.37150°N 1.43698°W	City Road		1900	Designed by Charles Hadfield	II
Former Sheffield Savings Bank; 53.36393°N 1.47177°W	Queens Road		1900		II
Wesley House; 53.36643°N 1.47395°W	Highfield Place		1906		II
Belgian War Memorial; 53.37155°N 1.43716°W	City Road		About 1920	Within City Road Cemetery	II
City Road Cemetery War Memorial; 53.36971°N 1.43880°W	City Road		About 1920	Designed by Reginald Blomfield	II
St Aidan and St Luke; 53.37232°N 1.44380°W	City Road		1933	Designed by Flockton & Son	II
St Aidan and St Luke Wall and Gate Piers; 53.37247°N 1.44415°W	City Road		1933	Designed by Flockton & Son	II
City Road Cemetery Blitz Grave; 53.36914°N 1.43591°W	City Road		About 1941		II
Park Hill Flats; 53.37946°N 1.45933°W	Duke Street		1961	Designed by Jack Lynn and Ivor Smith	II*
