= Shrewsbury Hospital =

Almshouse in Sheffield, South Yorkshire, England

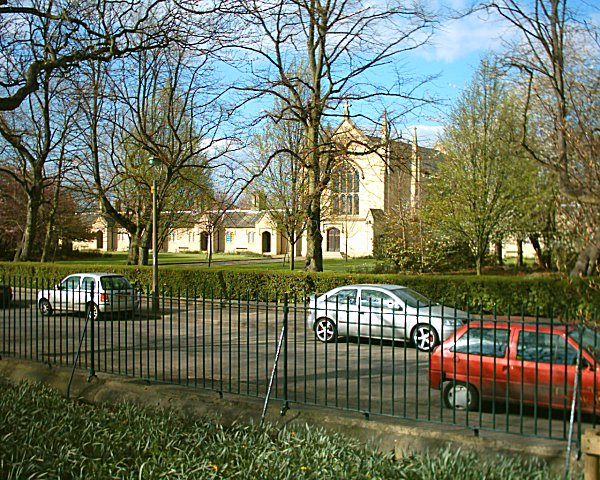
- Shrewsbury Hospital

- Shown in South Yorkshire

General information
- Location: Sheffield, England
- Coordinates: 53.3772°N 1.4571°W
- Construction started: 1825
- Completed: 1828

Shrewsbury Hospital refers to a row of almshouses and a chapel in Sheffield, South Yorkshire, England.

== History ==
When he died in 1616, Gilbert Talbot, 13th Earl of Shrewsbury declared in his will that he wanted to found a "hospital" i.e. almshouses "at Sheffield for the perpetual maintenance of 20 poor persons." The home for the 20 poor people was built near Sheffield Castle and completed in 1666.

The original almshouses became dilapidated and in the early 19th century a new site on Norfolk Road was chosen for the almshouses: new almshouses were designed by Woodhead & Hurst in the Gothic style and built between 1825 and 1828.

== Sources ==
- Roach, John (2003). The Shrewsbury Hospital, Sheffield 1616-1975. Borthwick Publications. p. 1. ISBN 978-1904497066.
