= Hollis Hospital =

1703 Almshouse in Sheffield, England

Coordinates: 53.3399°N 1.5314°W

Hollis Hospital is an almshouse dating from 1703 in Sheffield, England.

== Thomas Hollis ==
Thomas Hollis (1634–1718) was apprenticed to a John Ramsker, a cutler, and was sent to London in 1654 to manage Ramsker's wholesale cutlery business. Hollis became a dissenter and Baptist. Hollis prospered in London becoming a Freeman of the City of London and a member of the Worshipful Company of Drapers. He was noted for his philanthropy, particularly in his native Sheffield. He was associated with the building of New Hall, the first dissenter chapel in the city and in 1700 the building of a new, larger chapel. In 1703 Hollis bought New Hall and the adjoining house which he converted into Hollis Hospital. He was also a benefactor of St. Thomas' Hospital in London and Harvard College in Massachusetts. Hollis had four children, one of whom was Thomas Hollis (1659–1731) who continued his father's support of Harvard.

== Hollis Hospital ==
The original Hollis Hospital was at the junction of Newhall St and Bridge St in the Wicker area of Sheffield. Hollis Hospital was established originally for the care of 16 poor women, mainly the widows of workers in the Sheffield cutlery trades. The almshouses were further augmented and endowed by two of his sons (Thomas and John) in 1724 and 1726 respectively. The original almshouse was rebuilt by the trustees in 1776 to be more commodious and to incorporate a school for fifty children. In 1901 the original building was demolished as part of a road-widening scheme. The hospital was transferred to new premises at the junction of Whirlowdale Road and Ecclesall Road South in the south of the city. There are four accommodation blocks: East, West, Central and North West. The four blocks were designed by Howard C Clarke and built in 1903. Each of the four blocks is a grade II listed building. The east block has a inscribed slate plaque dated 1703.

== Citations ==
- "Insurance Plan of Sheffield", British Library, 1896
- Disney, J. (1808), "Memoirs of Thomas Brand-Hollis, Esq.", natgould.org
- Ivimey, J. (1823), "A History of the English Baptists", natgould.org
- Historic England (12 December 1995). "East block at Hollis Hospital (Grade II) (1255159)". National Heritage List for England.
- Historic England (12 December 1995). "West block at Hollis Hospital (Grade II) (1058980)". National Heritage List for England.
- Historic England (12 December 1995). "North West block at Hollis Hospital (Grade II) (1270722)". National Heritage List for England.
- Historic England (12 December 1995). "Central block at Hollis Hospital (Grade II) (1344935)". National Heritage List for England.
- Leader, R. E. (1905), "Reminiscences of Sheffield in the Eighteenth Century", natgould.org
- Waters, H. F. (1891), "Genealogical Gleanings in England", natgould.org – via The New England Historical and Genealogical Register
