= Listed buildings in Sheffield S14 =

The S14 district lies in the City of Sheffield, South Yorkshire, England. The district contains 2 listed buildings that are recorded in the National Heritage List for England. Both the listed buildings are designated at Grade II, the lowest of the three grades, which is applied to "buildings of national importance and special interest". The district is in the south east of the city of Sheffield, and covers the Gleadless Valley area. The listed buildings consist of a pub and a community centre.

For neighbouring areas, see listed buildings in S2, listed buildings in S8 and listed buildings in S12.

== Buildings ==
| Name and location | Photograph | Date | Notes |
|---|---|---|---|
| The Herdings; 53.34302°N 1.43741°W | | 1675 | Constructed as a farmhouse, most of the building dates from 1675, but it includes an earlier structure. It is cruck framed, and of two storeys, with a single storey extension at the rear, and a further 20th century addition. |
| Bagshawe Arms; 53.33789°N 1.44673°W | | 1770 | The pub is built of stone and is of two storeys, with a T-shaped plan. The centre of the front has a pediment with a blank roundel. The building was altered in the late 19th century and again in the 20th century. |
