= Listed buildings in Sheffield S20 =

The S20 district lies within the City of Sheffield, South Yorkshire, England. The district contains 22 listed buildings that are recorded in the National Heritage List for England. Of these, one is listed at Grade II*, the middle grade, and the others are at Grade II, the lowest grade. The district is in the south east of the city of Sheffield, and covers the areas of Beighton, Crystal Peaks, Halfway, Mosborough, Owlthorpe, Sothall, Waterthorpe and Westfield.

For neighbouring areas, see listed buildings in S12, listed buildings in S13, listed buildings in Aston cum Aughton, listed buildings in Eckington, Derbyshire, listed buildings in Killamarsh, and listed buildings in Wales, South Yorkshire.

== Key ==
Grade	Criteria
II*	Particularly important buildings of more than special interest
II	Buildings of national importance and special interest

== Buildings ==
Name and location	Street	Photograph	Date	Notes	Grade
St Mary the Virgin; 53.34523°N 1.33647°W	High Street		12th century		II*
Mosborough Hall Service Building; 53.32173°N 1.35712°W	High Street		Early 17th century		II
Plumbley Farmhouse; 53.32293°N 1.37749°W	Plumbley Lane		Early 17th century		II
Eckington Hall Farm Winnowing Barn; 53.32019°N 1.36301°W	South Street		Mid 17th century		II
Mosborough Hall; 53.32171°N 1.35739°W	High Street		Mid 17th century		II
31 South Street; 53.32145°N 1.36214°W	South Street		Mid 17th century		II
Manor Farmhouse; 53.34374°N 1.33525°W	High Street		About 1700		II
Mosborough Hall West Wall and Gatepiers; 53.32118°N 1.36142°W	Kelgate		Early 18th century		II
32 South Street Summerhouse and Wall; 53.32110°N 1.36214°W	South Street		Early 18th century		II
2 Duke Street; 53.32334°N 1.36143°W	Duke Street		Mid 18th century		II
156 Hollow Lane; 53.32188°N 1.35773°W	Hollow Lane		Mid 18th century		II
Waterthorpe Farmhouse; 53.33368°N 1.34924°W	Westfield Northway		Mid 18th century		II
Reignhead Farm Barn and Stable; 53.34672°N 1.34370°W	Robin Lane		Late 18th century		II
Sothall Green Farmhouse and Cartshed; 53.34382°N 1.34400°W	Drakehouse Lane		Late 18th century		II
Sothall Green Farmhouse Barn; 53.34386°N 1.34457°W	Drakehouse Lane		Late 18th century		II
Mosborough Hall Farm Barns and Cowsheds; 53.32215°N 1.35752°W	Hollow Lane		Early 19th century		II
Mosborough Hall Farm South and East Farmbuildings; 53.32191°N 1.35722°W	Hollow Lane		Early 19th century		II
Moss Cottage; 53.32216°N 1.35777°W	Hollow Lane		Early 19th century		II
Sothall Green Farmhouse West Cartshed; 53.34352°N 1.34491°W	Drakehouse Lane		Early 19th century		II
Mosborough Hall Gateway; 53.32180°N 1.35815°W	High Street		About 1840		II
Halfway War Memorial; 53.32779°N 1.34668°W	Station Road		1920	Designed by H. W. Roberts	II
Mosborough War Memorial; 53.32458°N 1.36159°W	High Street		1920		II
