= Hunter's Bar =

Roundabout in Sheffield, South Yorkshire, England

Coordinates: 53.367601°N 1.502253°W

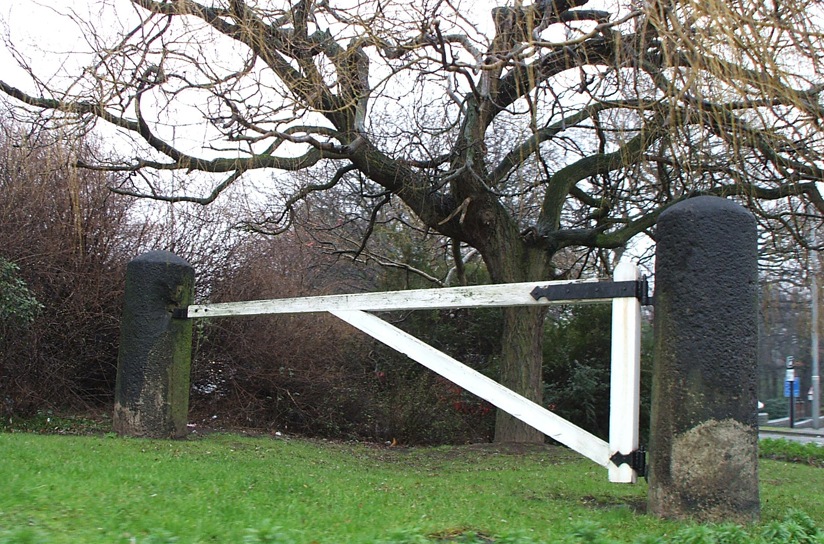
The gate at Hunter's Bar

Hunter's Bar is a roundabout and former toll bar on Ecclesall Road in south-west Sheffield, England; the toll bar was active until the late 19th century. The name also attaches to the area surrounding Hunter's Bar roundabout at the intersection of Ecclesall Road, Brocco Bank, Sharrow Vale Road and Junction Road. The toll bar now stands in the middle of the roundabout. The gatekeeper for the toll bar, known as "Hunter's Toll Gate" lived in a house on the corner of Ecclesall Road and Sharrow Vale Road. In 1871, the gatekeeper was Jacob Thompson, who was born in Wirksworth, Derbyshire and had previously been a lead miner there. His wife and two daughters lived with him.

The area is featured in the Arctic Monkeys' song "Fake Tales of San Francisco", in particular the lyric, "He talks of San Francisco, he's from Hunter's Bar". Hunter's Bar roundabout has its own Twitter account and its own website.

Hunter's Bar is located where the Ecclesall ward of Sheffield Hallam constituency and Broomhill & Sharrow Vale ward of Sheffield Central constituency meet. The main shopping area is situated on Ecclesall Road. Much of the terraced housing in Hunter's Bar and nearby Sharrow Vale is directly attributable to the industrial revolution when housing was built for workers.

Close to the roundabout are Endcliffe Park and Hunter's Bar Infant and Junior Schools. On Sharrow Vale Road and Ecclesall Road there are fashionable shops, restaurants, cafes and pubs.

Football has been played at Hunter's Bar for over 100 years, notably when The Albion FC played at Hunter's Bar from 1872. Though long gone, the area still has its own team Hunter's Bar FC, who play in the Hope Valley League.

Housing in the area is split between upmarket Yorkstone semi-detached houses and redbrick terraces. There is a high density of students from the nearby University of Sheffield and Sheffield Hallam University campuses.

The former Wilson Road Synagogue lies near Hunter's Bar.
