= Listed buildings in Sheffield S17 =

The S17 district lies within the City of Sheffield, South Yorkshire, England. The district contains 39 listed buildings that are recorded in the National Heritage List for England. All the listed buildings are designated at Grade II, the lowest of the three grades, which is applied to "buildings of national importance and special interest". The district is in the south west of the city of Sheffield, and covers the areas of Bradway, Dore and Totley.

For neighbouring areas, see listed buildings in S7, listed buildings in S8, listed buildings in S11, listed buildings in Dronfield, listed buildings in Grindleford and listed buildings in Holmesfield.

== Buildings ==
Name and location	Street	Photograph	Date	Notes
Hall Farmhouse; 53.31690°N 1.51144°W	Bradway Road		16th century	
Cannon Hall; 53.31556°N 1.54056°W	Butts Hill		Late 16th century	
Totley Hall; 53.31170°N 1.53963°W	Totley Hall Lane		1623	
Church Lane Farmhouse; 53.32532°N 1.53929°W	Vicarage Lane		Mid-17th century	
Croft House; 53.32545°N 1.54083°W	Church Lane		Late-17th century	
88 and 90 Townhead Road; 53.32615°N 1.54464°W	Townhead Road		1686	
Bryn and Moor Cottages; 53.31471°N 1.54188°W	Hillfoot Road		1704	
Woodbine Cottages; 53.32779°N 1.53557°W	Vicarage Lane		About 1740	
Ash Cottage; 53.31528°N 1.54073°W	Butts Hill		Mid 18th century	
The Cottage; 53.31926°N 1.50020°W	Bradway Road		Mid 18th century	
5 and 6 High Street; 53.32728°N 1.53892°W	High Street		Mid 18th century	
Limb Brook Footbridge; 53.33207°N 1.52445°W	Ryecroft Glen		Mid 18th century	400 metres north west of Abbeydale Road South
Lower Bents Farmhouse; 53.31693°N 1.54913°W	Penny Lane		Mid 18th century	
46–52 Bradway Road; 53.32146°N 1.50019°W	Bradway Road		1769	
Needham's Dyke Bridge; 53.31742°N 1.54248°W	Hillfoot Road		Late 18th century	
Old Hay Brook Bridge; 53.31870°N 1.54451°W	Hillfoot Road		Late 18th century	
94–104 Townhead Road; 53.32602°N 1.54512°W	Townhead Road		Late 18th century	
Totley Hall Farmhouse; 53.31220°N 1.53961°W	Totley Hall Lane		About 1780	
1 and 3 Savage Lane; 53.32648°N 1.53888°W	Savage Lane		1782	
First Steps Nursery School; 53.32601°N 1.53700°W	Savage Lane		1821	
Bradway Lodge; 53.32287°N 1.49861°W	Bradway Road		Early 19th century	
Brook Hall; 53.31352°N 1.52460°W	Mickley Lane		Early 19th century	
Brook Hall Stable and Coach House; 53.31340°N 1.52436°W	Mickley Lane		Early 19th century	
Grange Farmhouse; 53.31688°N 1.51086°W	Bradway Road		Early 19th century	
School House; 53.31300°N 1.54024°W	Totley Hall Lane		1827	Designed by D'Ewes Coke
Christ Church, Dore; 53.32567°N 1.53961°W	Church Lane		1828	Designed by Richard Furness
Abbeydale Hall; 53.32479°N 1.52013°W	Abbeydale Road South		Mid 19th century	
Cherry Tree Lodge; 53.31410°N 1.52521°W	Mickley Lane		About 1850	
Thomas Wiley Monument; 53.32736°N 1.51680°W	Abbeydale Road South		1853	
Christ Church Lych Gate, Gateway and Walls; 53.32567°N 1.53898°W	Vicarage Lane		Late 19th century	
Licensed Victuallers Almshouses; 53.32729°N 1.51731°W	Abbeydale Road South		1879	
Post Delivery Office; 53.32605°N 1.51736°W	Abbeydale Road South		1893	
The Dingle; 53.31834°N 1.52163°W	Totley Rise		1904	Designed by Edgar Wood
Moorwinstow; 53.32924°N 1.53019°W	Dore Road		1912	Designed by Norman Doncaster
Moorwinstow Gateway and Walls; 53.32951°N 1.53017°W	Dore Road		1912	Designed by Norman Doncaster
Dore War Memorial; 53.32607°N 1.53808°W	Vicarage Lane		About 1920	
Totley War Memorial; 53.31418°N 1.54352°W	Baslow Road		1920	
All Saints, Totley; 53.31309°N 1.53921°W	Totley Hall Lane		1923	Designed by Currie & Thompson
All Saints, Totley, Steps and Wall; 53.31325°N 1.53936°W	Totley Hall Lane		1923	Designed by Currie & Thompson
