= Listed buildings in Sheffield S8 =

The S8 district lies within the City of Sheffield, South Yorkshire, England. The district contains 69 listed buildings that are recorded in the National Heritage List for England. Of these, six are listed at Grade II*, the middle grade, and the others are at Grade II, the lowest grade. The district is in the south of the city of Sheffield, and covers the areas of Batemoor, Beauchief, Greenhill, Jordanthorpe, Lowedges, Meersbrook, Norton, Norton Lees and Woodseats, and part of Heeley.

For neighbouring areas, see listed buildings in S2, listed buildings in S7, listed buildings in S12, listed buildings in S14, listed buildings in S17, listed buildings in Dronfield and listed buildings in Eckington, Derbyshire.

== Key ==
Grade	Criteria
II*	Particularly important buildings of more than special interest
II	Buildings of national importance and special interest

== Buildings ==
Name and location	Street	Photograph	Date	Notes	Grade
St James; 53.33519°N 1.46267°W	Norton Church Road		11th century		II*
Beauchief Abbey; 53.33317°N 1.50077°W	Beauchief Abbey Lane		About 1175		II*
Norton Cross; 53.33500°N 1.46264°W	Norton Church Road		14th century	In St James churchyard	II
Bishops' House; 53.35133°N 1.47032°W	Norton Lees Lane		About 1500		II*
Beauchief Abbey House Barn; 53.33467°N 1.50161°W	Abbey Lane		16th century		II
The Manor; 53.32719°N 1.48490°W	Greenhill Main Road		Late 16th century		II
Grange Farmhouse; 53.33559°N 1.44752°W	Herewards Road		Early 17th century		II
Beauchief Hall Stables; 53.32896°N 1.50890°W	Beauchief Drive		1667		II
Oakes Park; 53.33425°N 1.45152°W	Norton Lane		1668	Remodelled by Joseph Badger	II*
The Poplars; 53.33950°N 1.47179°W	Cobnar Road		1670		II*
Beauchief Hall; 53.32960°N 1.50753°W	Beauchief Drive		1671		II*
Beauchief Hall Wall and Gate Piers; 53.32939°N 1.50809°W	Beauchief Drive		Late 17th century		II
Oakes Park Stable Range and Cottage; 53.33450°N 1.45167°W	Norton Lane		Late 17th century		II
Bolehill Farmhouse and Outbuildings; 53.33910°N 1.47205°W	Cobnar Road		Early 18th century		II
Chantrey Cottage and House; 53.33471°N 1.45698°W	Maugerhay		Early 18th century		II
61 and 63 Greenhill Main Road; 53.32691°N 1.48227°W	Greenhill Main Road		Early 18th century		II
Norton Grange, Wash House, Stable and Wall; 53.33651°N 1.46088°W	Norton Church Road		Early 18th century		II
Oakes Park Garden Entrance Gate and Walls; 53.33434°N 1.45274°W	Norton Lane		Early 18th century		II
Oakes Park Pigeoncote; 53.33466°N 1.45188°W	Norton Lane		Early 18th century		II
Old Rectory; 53.33495°N 1.46177°W	Norton Church Road		Early 18th century		II
Chantry Cottage; 53.33376°N 1.46263°W	Norton Lane		About 1740		II
Beauchief Abbey Farmhouse; 53.33264°N 1.50043°W	Beauchief Abbey Lane		Mid 18th century		II
Cottages North West of Beauchief Abbey; 53.33330°N 1.50110°W	Beauchief Abbey Lane		Mid 18th century		II
Croft Farmhouse and Rose Cottage; 53.32708°N 1.48355°W	Greenhill Main Road		Mid 18th century		II
Holly Farmhouse; 53.32717°N 1.48413°W	Greenhill Main Road		Mid 18th century		II
Jordanthorpe Hall Farmhouse; 53.33113°N 1.45952°W	Cinderhill Lane		Mid 18th century		II
Jordanthorpe House; 53.33028°N 1.46220°W	Bochum Parkway		Mid 18th century		II
Beauchief Abbey Farmhouse Farmbuildings; 53.33239°N 1.50077°W	Beauchief Abbey Lane		Late 18th century		II
Chantrey House; 53.33016°N 1.46066°W	Bochum Parkway		Late 18th century		II
Grange Farmhouse and Cottage; 53.32726°N 1.48012°W	Greenfield Drive		Late 18th century		II
The Manor Forecourt, Walls, Gateway and Outbuildings; 53.32694°N 1.48496°W	Greenhill Main Road		Late 18th century		II
Meersbrook House; 53.35406°N 1.47685°W	Brook Road		Late 18th century		II
Norton Hall Stable Block; 53.33599°N 1.46270°W	Norton Church Road		Late 18th century		II
Norton Hall; 53.33528°N 1.46372°W	Norton Church Road		Late 18th century		II*
10 Norton Hammer Lane; 53.35095°N 1.48316°W	Norton Hammer Lane		Late 18th century		II
Oakes Park Gate, Railings and Walls; 53.33465°N 1.45116°W	Norton Lane		Late 18th century		II
Post Office House; 53.33546°N 1.45543°W	School Lane		Late 18th century		II
School House; 53.33563°N 1.45517°W	School Lane		Late 18th century		II
3 and 5 School Lane; 53.32733°N 1.48255°W	School Lane		Late 18th century		II
80 Annesley Road; 53.32749°N 1.48215°W	Annesley Road		About 1800		II
Grooms Cottage; 53.33528°N 1.45528°W	School Lane		About 1800		II
Norton Hall Farm; 53.33639°N 1.46190°W	Norton Church Road		1802		II
Oakes Park West Entrance Lodge, Gate and Walls; 53.33586°N 1.45631°W	Norton Lane		Early 19th century		II
59 Greenhill Main Road; 53.32695°N 1.48266°W	Greenhill Main Road		1829		II
The Crown; 53.35910°N 1.47487°W	Chesterfield Road		About 1840		II
Francis Chantrey Tomb; 53.33508°N 1.46304°W	Norton Church Road		1841	Designed by Francis Chantrey	II
Former Bakery; 53.35953°N 1.47401°W	Thirlwell Road		About 1850		II
Memorial Obelisk; 53.33461°N 1.46192°W	Norton Church Road		1850	At junction with Norton Lane	II
7 and 9 Norton Hammer Lane; 53.35110°N 1.48338°W	Norton Hammer Lane		Mid 19th century		II
11, 12 and 13 Norton Hammer Lane; 53.35088°N 1.48352°W	Norton Hammer Lane		Mid 19th century		II
Water Pump; 53.32681°N 1.48285°W	Greenhill Main Road		Mid 19th century		II
Graves Park North Entrance; 53.34002°N 1.46998°W	Derbyshire Lane		About 1870		II
18, 18A, 20 and 20A Linden Avenue; 53.34019°N 1.48672°W	Linden Avenue		About 1870	Designed by Norman Shaw	II
Norton Nursery Lodge; 53.33345°N 1.46269°W	Norton Lane		About 1870		II
Sewer Gas Lamp; 53.35205°N 1.46863°W	Bishopcourt Road		Late 19th century		II
Sewer Gas Lamp; 53.35827°N 1.46654°W	Kent Road		Late 19th century	At junction with Nicholson Road	II
Sewer Gas Lamp; 53.35587°N 1.46435°W	Upper Albert Road		Late 19th century	At junction with Rushdale Road	II
20 to 42 Albert Road; 53.35876°N 1.47438°W	Albert Road		1878	Former tram depot	II
Meersbrook Works; 53.35740°N 1.47369°W	Valley Road		About 1880		II
Drinking Fountain; 53.35476°N 1.47548°W	Meersbrook Park		1891	Made by A. J. & S. Eaton	II
Park Lodge Former Police Station; 53.34556°N 1.49642°W	Archer Road		1893		II
Vestry Hall, Wall and Railing; 53.35676°N 1.47589°W	Meersbrook Park Road		About 1900		II
Carfield Schools and Shelter; 53.35415°N 1.46638°W	Argyle Road		1903	Designed by Joseph Norton	II
Carfield Schools Boundary Walls and Gates; 53.35370°N 1.46529°W	Argyle Road		1903	Designed by Joseph Norton	II
Carfield Schools House and Walls; 53.35396°N 1.46671°W	Argyle Road		1903	Designed by Joseph Norton	II
St Chad; 53.33984°N 1.48607°W	Linden Avenue		1912	Designed by C. and C. M. Hadfield	II
Norton War Memorial; 53.33484°N 1.46225°W	Norton Lane		1922		II
Our Lady of Beauchief and St Thomas of Canterbury; 53.33780°N 1.48220°W	Meadowhead		1932	Designed by Adrian Gilbert Scott	II
St Peter; 53.32526°N 1.48866°W	Reney Avenue		1965	Designed by Peter Sargent	II
