= Listed buildings in Sheffield S12 =

The S12 district lies within the City of Sheffield, South Yorkshire, England. The district contains 13 listed buildings that are recorded in the National Heritage List for England. All the listed buildings are designated at Grade II, the lowest of the three grades, which is applied to "buildings of national importance and special interest". The district is in the south east of the city of Sheffield, and covers the areas of Birley, Charnock, Gleadless, Gleadless Townend, Frecheville, Hackenthorpe and Intake.

For neighbouring areas, see listed buildings in S2, listed buildings in S8, listed buildings in S13, listed buildings in S14, listed buildings in S20 and listed buildings in Eckington, Derbyshire.

== Buildings ==
Name and location	Street	Photograph	Date	Notes
Greenside House; 53.34465°N 1.37199°W	Beighton Road		Early 18th century	
Newlands Farmhouse, Cottages, Walls and Railings; 53.32973°N 1.38734°W	High Lane		Mid 18th Century	
Newlands Farmhouse Coach House and Stable; 53.32955°N 1.38766°W	High Lane		Late 18th Century	
Commonside Farmhouse; 53.35212°N 1.43049°W	Gleadless Common		About 1800	
Newlands Farmhouse Garden Wall; 53.32947°N 1.38739°W	High Lane		About 1800	
Birley Spa; 53.34773°N 1.38676°W	Birley Spa Lane		Early 19th century	
Christ Church, Gleadless Townend; 53.35137°N 1.42331°W	Hollinsend Road		1839	
Christ Church Wall and Gates; 53.35115°N 1.42398°W	Hollinsend Road		About 1839	
Intake Cemetery Chapel; 53.35731°N 1.41496°W	Mansfield Road		1879	Designed by Innocent and Brown
Intake Cemetery Lodge, Wall and Washhouse; 53.35706°N 1.41524°W	Mansfield Road		1879	Designed by Innocent and Brown
Intake Cemetery Wall and Gates; 53.35696°N 1.41520°W	Mansfield Road		1879	Designed by Innocent and Brown
War Memorial and Wall; 53.35087°N 1.42385°W	Hollinsend Road		About 1920	
Hackenthorpe War Memorial; 53.34345°N 1.37883°W	Sheffield Road		Before 1933	
