= Base metal =

Common and inexpensive metal

A base metal is a common and inexpensive metal, as opposed to a precious metal such as gold or silver. In numismatics, coins often derived their value from the precious metal content; however, base metals have also been used in coins in the past and today.

== Specific definitions ==
In contrast to noble metals, base metals may be distinguished by oxidizing or corroding relatively easily and reacting variably with diluted hydrochloric acid (HCl) to form hydrogen. Examples include iron, nickel, lead and zinc. Copper is also considered a base metal because it oxidizes relatively easily, although it does not react with HCl.

In mining and economics, the term base metals refers to industrial non-ferrous metals excluding precious metals. These include copper, lead, nickel and zinc.

The U.S. Customs and Border Protection agency is more inclusive in its definition of commercial base metals. Its list includes—in addition to copper, lead, nickel, and zinc—the following metals: iron and steel (an alloy), aluminium, tin, tungsten, molybdenum, tantalum, cobalt, bismuth, cadmium, titanium, zirconium, antimony, manganese, beryllium, chromium, germanium, vanadium, gallium, hafnium, indium, niobium, rhenium, and thallium, and their alloys.

== Other uses ==
In the context of plated metal products, the base metal underlies the plating metal, as copper underlies silver in Sheffield plate.

== See also ==
- London Metal Exchange
- Philosopher's stone
- Pot metal
- Reactivity series
