= Listed buildings in Sheffield S7 =

The S7 district lies in the City of Sheffield, South Yorkshire, England. The district contains 16 listed buildings that are recorded in the National Heritage List for England. Of these, one is listed at Grade I, the highest of the three grades, two are at Grade II*, the middle grade, and the others are at Grade II, the lowest grade. The district is in the north west of the city of Sheffield, and covers parts of the areas of Carter Knowle, Millhouses, Nether Edge and Sharrow.

For neighbouring areas, see listed buildings in S2, listed buildings in S8, listed buildings in S11 and listed buildings in S17.

== Key ==
Grade	Criteria
I	Buildings of exceptional interest, sometimes considered to be internationally important
II*	Particularly important buildings of more than special interest
II	Buildings of national importance and special interest

== Buildings ==
Name and location	Street	Photograph	Date	Notes	Grade
The Edge; 53.35944°N 1.49192°W	Ladysmith Avenue		Late 18th century		II
Abbeydale Industrial Hamlet Works; 53.33336°N 1.51197°W	Abbeydale Road South		1785		I
Charcoal Burner's Memorial; 53.33946°N 1.51482°W	Ecclesall Woods		1786	East of Whirlowdale Road	II
Abbeydale Industrial Hamlet Counting House and Workmen's Cottages; 53.33390°N 1.51231°W	Abbeydale Road South		1793		II*
Abbeydale Industrial Hamlet Manager's House and Stable; 53.33373°N 1.51177°W	Abbeydale Road South		1838		II*
Abbeydale House; 53.35298°N 1.48731°W	Barmouth Road		1848		II
The Lodge; 53.33638°N 1.51248°W	Abbey Lane		About 1870		II
The Lodge Wall and Gate Piers; 53.33635°N 1.51245°W	Abbey Lane		1873		II
Haqqani House; 53.36389°N 1.47789°W	Vincent Road		1890	Demolished following fire	II
Lantern Theatre; 53.36484°N 1.48484°W	Kenwood Park Road		1893		II
St Oswald; 53.35132°N 1.48884°W	Bannerdale Road		1914		II
Carter Knowle Junior School; 53.35263°N 1.49140°W	Carter Knowle Road		1906	Designed by Holmes and Watson	II
Carter Knowle Junior School Caretakers House; 53.35263°N 1.49204°W	Carter Knowle Road		1906	Designed by Holmes and Watson	II
Carter Knowle Junior School Wall and Railing; 53.35270°N 1.49201°W	Carter Knowle Road		1906	Designed by Holmes and Watson	II
Abbeydale Picture House; 53.35935°N 1.47985°W	Abbeydale Road		1920		II
Holy Trinity; 53.34709°N 1.50015°W	Grove Road		1937	Designed by J. Amory Teather	II
