= Thomas Boulsover =

English cutler and inventor

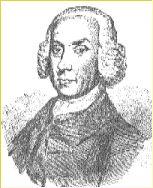
Thomas Boulsover

Thomas Boulsover (1705 – 9 September 1788), was an English Sheffield cutler who invented Old Sheffield Plate. He made his fortune manufacturing various items, but especially buttons using the process, he later diversified into making cast steel and saws.

== Early years and apprenticeship ==
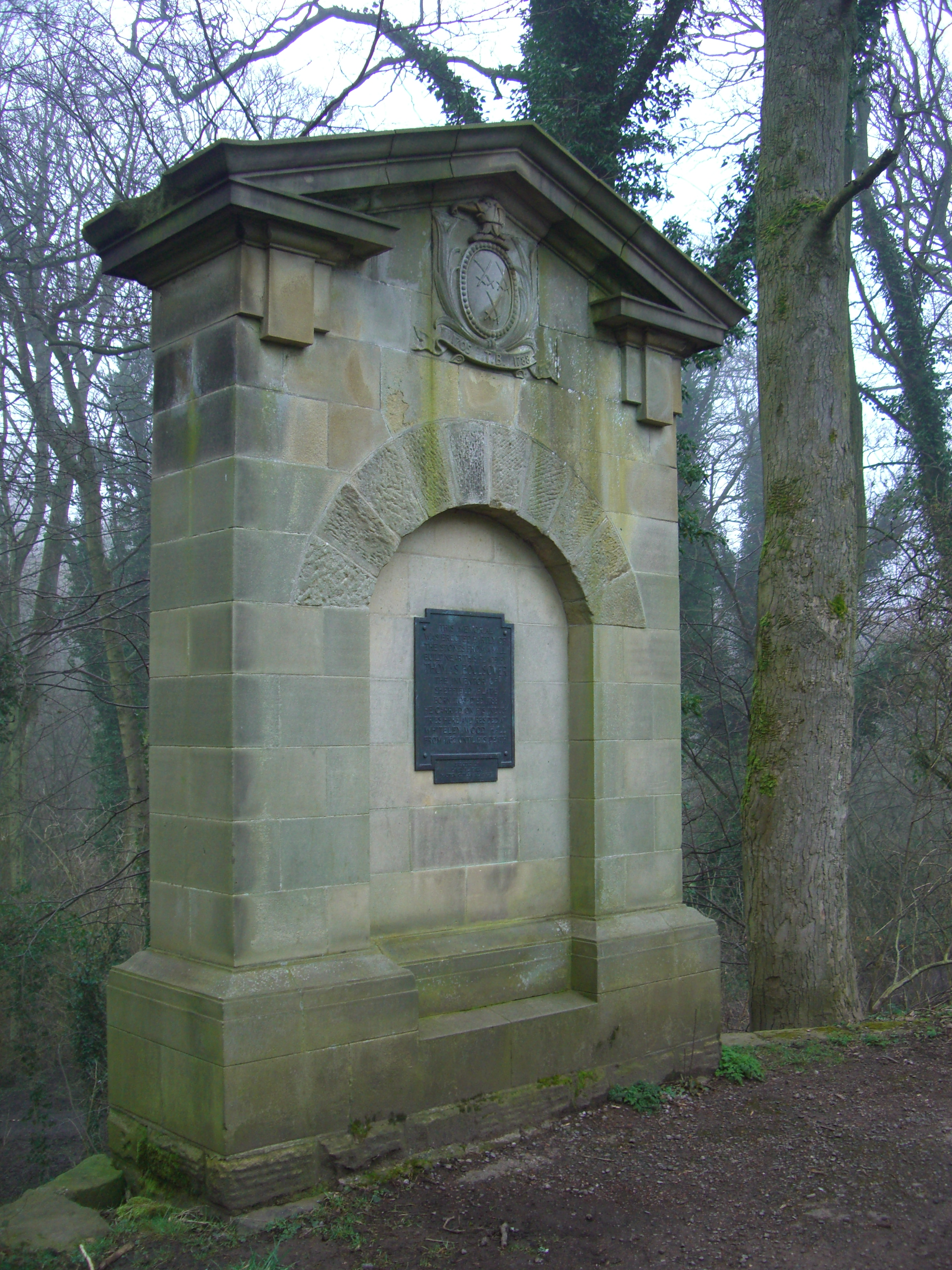
The Thomas Boulsover memorial at Wire Mill Dam

Boulsover was born in Longley, which was then a remote hamlet between the town of Sheffield and the village of Ecclesfield, He was the son of Samuel Boulsover, a farmer and cutler and Margaret Brownell of Hathersage, being baptised at Ecclesfield church on 18 October 1705. He began his apprenticeship to learn the trade of cutler in 1718, being apprenticed to Joseph Fletcher, a native of Wirksworth in Derbyshire who had established himself as a cutler in Sheffield. Fletcher was a Presbyterian and the young Boulsover would have been brought up with the same religious views as it was expected that an apprentice would join his master and family in their manner of worship. Thomas Boulsover's apprenticeship was completed in 1726 and he was granted the freedom of the Company of Cutlers in Hallamshire on 26 November of that year, the act being recorded in the Freedoms Book at the Cutlers' Hall. As was traditional Boulsover was also awarded his own trademark and this was registered in the Mark Book.

== Cutler ==
Boulsover chose to practice as a free cutler in the developing township of Sheffield and on 28 October 1728 he married Hannah Dodworth of Owlerton at Sheffield parish church, they set up home in the Norfolk Street area where groups of cutlers were settling in newly built properties. The Boulsovers' first child Sarah was born in June 1729 but the infant soon died; the Boulsovers had ten children throughout their marriage of which only two survived to adulthood. Thomas Boulsover continued as a cutler, with several apprentices working for him over the years; in the early 1740s he moved his business to new premises on Sycamore Hill (now Tudor Street) the workshop being on the corner of Tudor Street and Surrey Street opposite the present day Sheffield Central Library.

== Old Sheffield Plate ==
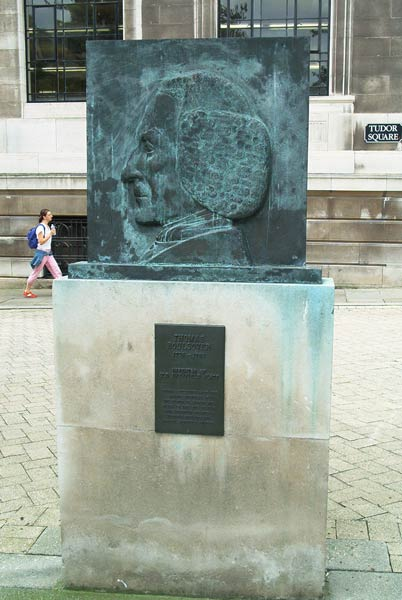
The Thomas Boulsover memorial at Tudor Square in central Sheffield.

In early 1743, Boulsover made the discovery which was to change his life and have an immense effect on the success and development of Sheffield. An often repeated story holds that, while repairing the decorative handle of a knife made from copper and silver, he accidentally slightly overheated the handle, causing the two metals to fuse. The story appears to derive from an obituary notice in the Sheffield Register of 13 September 1788. In his book on Old Sheffield Plate Gordon Crosskey calls the story "probably apocryphal", noting that the basic fact that copper and silver will fuse was likely known to many metalworkers previously. However, Boulsover found that when the silver and copper were fused together, they could be treated as one metal, meaning that an ingot of copper fused with a layer of silver could be rolled to any area and thickness and still retain the same proportion of the two metals. This satisfied Boulsover that the fused metal could be used on a commercial scale.

It is likely that Boulsover's first commercial application of his fusing method was on knife handles. Thereafter the business seems to have fairly quickly focused on buttons from fused plate, which were cheaper than the usual sterling silver buttons. Boulsover's buttons were stamped from a die on a fused metal sheet, then cut out, polished and burnished until they were hardly distinguishable from genuine silver. The business also made buckles, spurs and small snuff boxes. In 1749 Boulsover expanded his business in partnership with Joseph Broadbent. He rented a lease of land in Beeley Wood to build a grinding wheel, but an alteration to the original lease allowed it to be converted into a tilt forge known as the Nova Scotia Tilts.

Thomas Boulsover continued his enterprise with the help of two apprentices, also hiring John Hoyland as an agent to promote the sale of his buttons. Boulsover did not take out a patent on his discovery of Old Sheffield Plate and his cutlers such as Thomas Law and Joseph Hancock were able to set up rival firms. Hancock in particular was notable as the first to manufacture larger and hollow items from fused plate, and was later erroneously credited as the inventor of the material by some early 19th century sources. Despite this competition, Boulsover's button business thrived. In 1751 Boulsover was elected as one of the 24 assistants to the Master Cutler, however even though he was re-elected as an assistant the following year he never rose any higher in the Company of Cutlers. In 1757 he moved his business to larger premises on Norfolk Street (now the location of the Crucible Theatre stage door), in the same year he bought Whiteley Wood Hall from Strelley Pegge for £1350. Now a member of the gentry, Boulsover became involved in discussions on the Sheffield to Leeds turnpike road and became one of the original trustees.

== Later life ==
In 1760, Boulsover turned his interest to manufacturing better-quality steel. He purchased land from the Duke of Norfolk on the Porter Brook just below Whiteley Wood Hall and commenced rolling steel. He discovered that cast steel gave a much better edge to saws and concentrated on saw-making, with his product being far superior to those made by the old method of hammering. In 1774, Boulsover & Co. – based at Whiteley Woods and Norfolk Street – was described as “makers of saws, fenders, edge tools, cast steel and emory”. However, button-production continued at a site further up the Porter at Forge Dam, Fulwood.

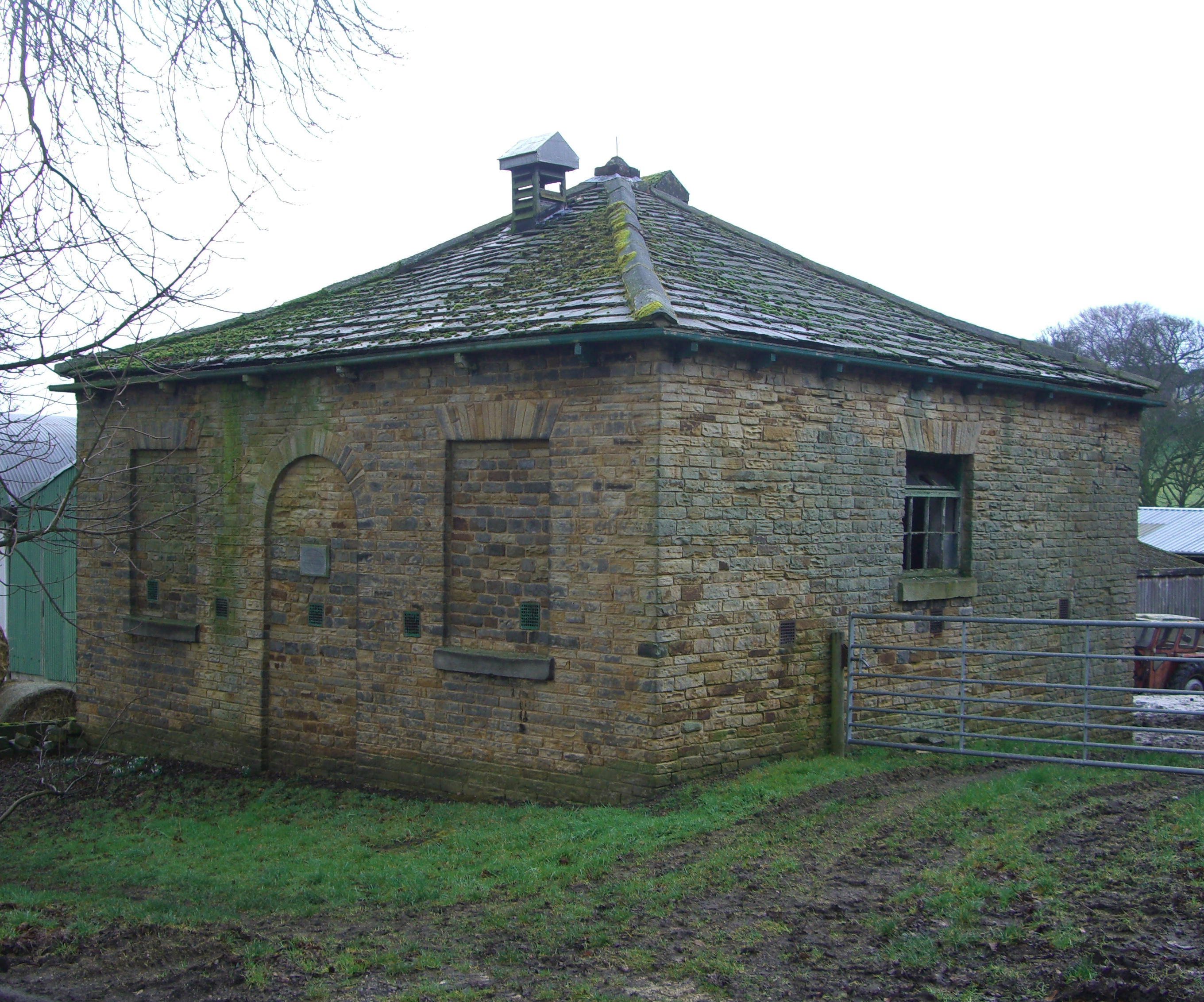
Methodist chapel at Meadow Farm built as a memorial to Boulsover by his daughters.

In 1772, Hannah Boulsover – Thomas's wife – died and was buried in the churchyard of St Paul's Church on 9 July. The couple had been married for almost 44 years. As Thomas Boulsover grew older, he was helped by Anthony Thompson, whom he had taken into partnership (and who eventually took over the management of the rolling mills and saw-manufacture). Thomas Boulsover died at Whiteley Wood Hall on Tuesday, 9 September 1788, and was buried on 13 September at St Paul's church alongside Hannah. Early in 1789, Boulsover's two surviving children – Mary Mitchell and Sarah Hutton – built a small Methodist chapel near to Whiteley Wood Hall in memory of their father. The chapel still stands today, although it is now an outbuilding of Meadow Farm. It has an plaque which reads “This chapel was built by Mary Mitchell and Sarah Hutton in 1789 in memory of their father Thomas Boulsover the inventor of Sheffield Plate (1705–1788).

== Sources ==
- Crosskey, Gordon (2011). Old Sheffield Plate: A History of the 18th Century Plated Trade (1st ed.). Sheffield: Treffry Publishing. ISBN 9780956800305.
