= Whirlow Hall Farm =

Farm in Sheffield, England

Coordinates: 53.34406°N 1.533639°W

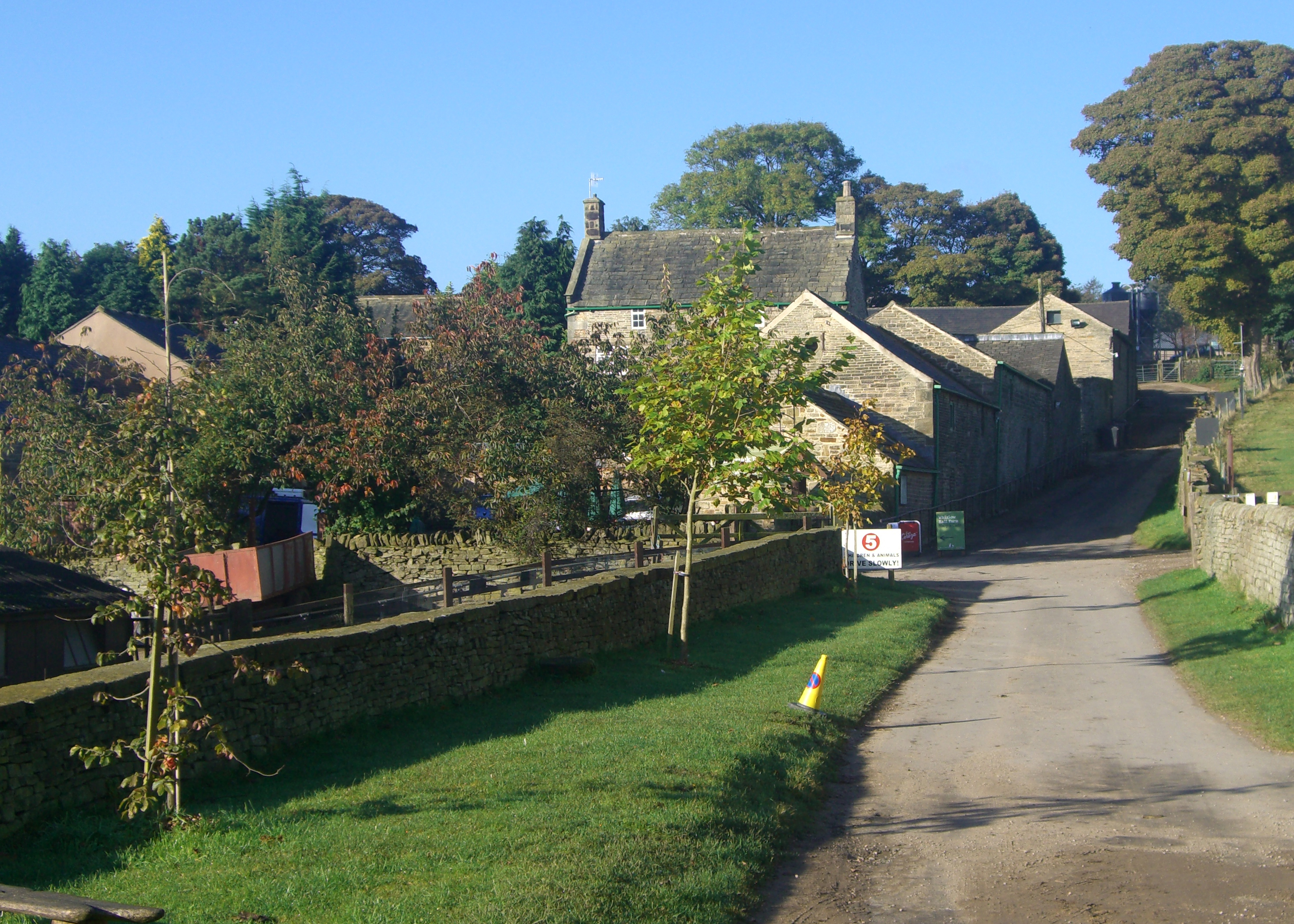
The group of historic farm buildings on Broad Elms Lane.

Whirlow Hall Farm is a working farm situated on Broad Elms Lane at Whirlow in the City of Sheffield, England. Since 1979 it has been the site of the Whirlow Hall Farm Trust, a registered charity which allows children and young people to visit a working farm. The site includes various Grade II listed buildings including Whirlow Farmhouse built on the site of the old Whirlow Hall. In the yard below the farmhouse is Whirlow Hall Cottage (sometimes called Low House) along with two ancient cruck barns and a cow shed.

== History ==
=== Earlier Brigantian and Roman farms on the site ===
Evidence of farming taking place on the site dating back to the Bronze Age has been found. In 2011 excavations revealed remains of a substantial 1st or 2nd century AD Roman rural estate center, or ‘villa’ on what is believed to be a pre-existing Brigantian farmstead. Further evidence of Roman occupation of the area can be found in an interim report by University of Sheffield staff on excavations of a linear feature at nearby Sheephill Farm, close to the Limb Brook. It has been suggested that this is the route of the lost Roman Road linking Templeborough with the Roman Signal Station at Navio and Batham Gate.

=== The old hall ===
The original Whirlow Hall is thought to date from the second half of the 16th century. It was built by the Brights, a wealthy local family who had initially made their fortune in the wool trade but by the 15th century had branched out into metalworking and lead production. It is thought that the Brights had lived in the Whirlow area from the early 14th century as a deed of 1303 mentions that Robert de Ecclesall, Lord of the manor gave lands in Whirlow, the hall and several messuages to John Bright. In Joseph Hunter’s Hallamshire it is mentioned that Richard Bright was making arrowheads for longbows at Whirlow Hall as early as 1501. The old hall was a stone faced building with some very large rooms and windows. By 1720 the Brights were bankrupt, mainly through the dissipation and bad debts of Henry Bright who had inherited the estate in 1694. The Whirlow Hall estate was sold to Sir John Statham in 1720 who in turn sold it to Thomas Hollis in 1725. Many of the outbuildings, including Whirlow Hall Cottage were constructed at this time as the Hollis Trust converted the farm for tenants.

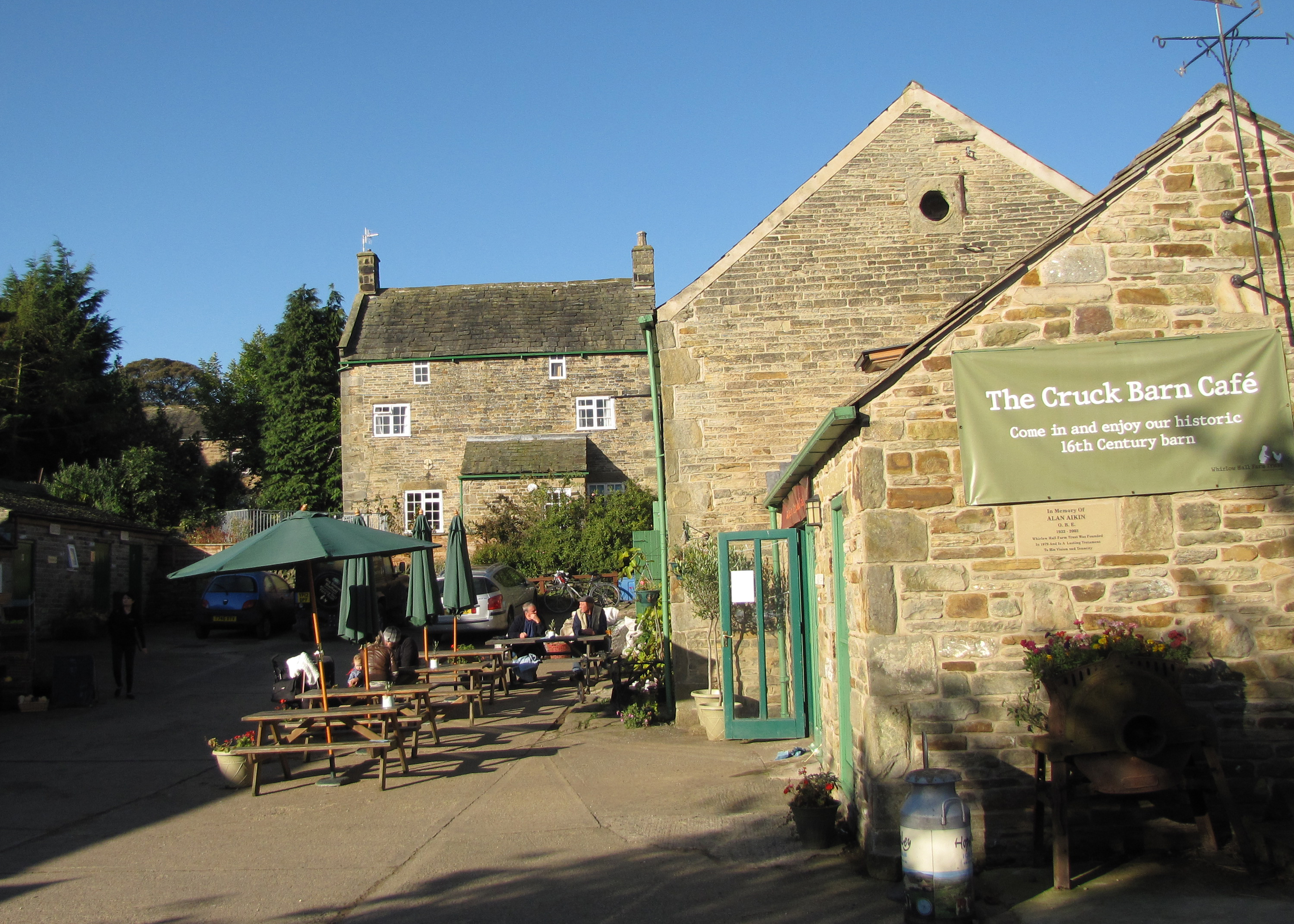
The lower yard featuring Whirlow Hall Cottage and the two cruck barns to the right.

=== The present hall is built ===
By the end of the 18th century the hall was in a state of poor repair, the east wing was pulled down in 1795 and the rest was demolished later, although local legend says it was struck by lightning and burnt down. In 1843 the present house was built on the site of the old hall, it is less grand than the original, being an attractive Jacobean inspired stone farmhouse. The Furness family were the first tenants in the new house, finally giving up the lease in 1937 and bringing to an end over 200 years of occupancy of Whirlow Hall along with their ancestors the Dungworths. Walter Clarke lived at the hall for a few years up to 1943.

== Whirlow Hall Farm Trust ==
Sheffield City Council bought the farm in 1943 and the hall in 1949, they sold off some of the surrounding land but retained the historic core of the farm along with 138 acres of land. Whirlow Hall Farm Trust was set up in 1979 as a charitable organisation and an educational trust working with inner city children and young people with special needs or disabilities. The Trust leases the farm from the Council. Princess Anne visited the project in 1980, in 1983 dormitories were added to allow children to have residential stays in the rural and historic setting. The farm has a variety of livestock, including sheep, pigs, cows, poultry, ponies, goats and horses. Some seasonal vegetables are grown in the fields and there is also a vineyard. Although the farm receives a small amount of funding from Sheffield City Council and raises some income through admission charges at events and the farm shop, it has to raise around £350,000 per annum through its charitable status. This is done through fundraising events and corporate sponsorship.
