= Listed buildings in Maltby, South Yorkshire =

Maltby is a civil parish in the Metropolitan Borough of Rotherham, South Yorkshire, England. The parish contains 40 listed buildings that are recorded in the National Heritage List for England. Of these, one is listed at Grade I, the highest of the three grades, three are at Grade II*, the middle grade, and the others are at Grade II, the lowest grade. The parish contains the town of Maltby and a large area to the southeast of the town. This area includes the country house of Sandbeck Park, which is listed together with a number of associated buildings and structures. Also in the area is Roche Abbey, and items in its grounds are listed. The other listed buildings include houses and cottages, a church and a tomb in the churchyard, a market cross, former watermills, farmhouses and farm buildings, mileposts, and a war memorial.

== Key ==
Grade	Criteria
I	Buildings of exceptional interest, sometimes considered to be internationally important
II*	Particularly important buildings of more than special interest
II	Buildings of national importance and special interest

== Buildings ==
Name and location	Photograph	Date	Notes	Grade
St Bartholomew's Church; 53.42114°N 1.20748°W		11th century	The oldest part of the church is the tower, and the body of the church was rebuilt in 1857–59. It is built in magnesian limestone with a Welsh slate roof, and consists of a nave, north and south aisles, a south porch, a chancel with a south vestry and a north organ chamber, and a west tower. The lower part of the tower dates from the 11th century, and the upper parts are in Perpendicular style. There are three stages, a four-light west window, blind round-headed openings on the north and south sides, two-light bell openings, an oversailing embattled parapet, and a recessed octagonal spire pierced by quatrefoils and with small lucarnes. The east window has five lights, and in the chapel is a circular window in an arched recess.	II*
Medieval tomb 53.42136°N 1.20753°W	—	14th century	The tomb was re-set in the lych gate of St Bartholomew's Church in about 1863. It is in magnesian limestone, and is inlaid in brass. The tomb is rectangular, with hollow plinth moulding and inscribed side panels. On the top is a moulded lid inlaid with a cross.	II
Tunnel entrance, Laughton Pond; 53.40117°N 1.18387°W	—	Medieval (probable)	The tunnel carries a stream from Laughton Pond to a river running through the grounds of Roche Abbey, and its entrance is flanked by walls built in about 1775. The walls are in magnesian limestone, and form a pointed arch with voussoirs rising from a chamfered plinth.	II
Market Cross; 53.42241°N 1.20640°W		Medieval	The market cross, standing at a road junction, is in magnesian limestone. It has a square plinth of three steps, with the carving of a skull in the northwest corner. The cross has a square base, a square tapered shaft, and a capital surmounted by a broken saltire cross.	II
Outbuilding, Yews Court; 53.39345°N 1.13898°W	—	16th century (probable)	Originally a house, the outbuilding is in limestone on a chamfered plinth, with quoins, and a pantile roof. There are two storeys and an attic, and two bays. The windows vary, some with moulded mullions and hood moulds.	II
Sandbeck Park; 53.40616°N 1.14560°W		1627	A country house designed by James Paine in Palladian style, it was built between about 1762 and 1768 incorporating an earlier house, and there were extensions in the 19th century and in 1905. The house is in magnesian limestone, and has three storeys and a basement, a front of nine bays, and five bays on the sides. On the front, the outer bays project under pediments. The middle three bays also project, and contain a Doric portico with a pediment containing a coat of arms in the tympanum. The basement and ground floor are rusticated, and at the top is a balustrades parapet with ball finials. The windows are sashes, those in the middle floor with architraves, cornices, and balustraded aprons. Flanking the middle three bays are quadrant staircases leading to an arcaded loggia of round arches with shaped keystones. Above this is a balustraded plinth, seven giant Corinthian columns, and a pedimented entablature containing a carving and a coat of arms.	I
Stone Mill; 53.40163°N 1.16739°W	—	17th century	A house and an attached watermill that were later extended. The building is in magnesian limestone and has pantile roofs with coped gables and shaped kneelers. Each part has two storeys, three bays, and a rear wing. The house has a central doorway with a chamfered quoined surround and a fanlight, and the windows are varied. The mill has a wide doorway, windows, and external steps to a landing over an archway into a wheel pit, and a segmental-arched doorway above.	II
27 Blyth Road; 53.42223°N 1.20565°W		1710	The house, which has been restored, is in limestone, with quoins, and a pantile roof, hipped on the corner, and with coped gables and shaped kneelers elsewhere. There are two storeys and an attic, three bays, a rear wing on the right, and an outshut in the angle. Above the doorway is a date plaque in an architrave, the windows are a mix of sashes and casements, and there is a gabled dormer above the doorway.	II
Rear wing, Yews Mill House; 53.39215°N 1.13401°W	—	Early 18th century (probable)	Originally part of a mill, later incorporated into a house, it is in magnesian limestone with a pantile roof. There are two storeys and three bays. In each floor is a central doorway with impost blocks and a cambered lintel. The windows are casements, some with mullions.	II
Folds Cottages and outbuildings 53.40954°N 1.13408°W	—	1750	A house in magnesian limestone on a plinth, with a rusticated ground floor, bands, and a cornice and blocking course to hipped roofs of Westmorland and Welsh slate and pantile. There are two storeys, a T-shaped plan, and three bays, flanked by single-storey single-bay pavilions. The central doorway has a modillion cornice, and in the outer bays are flat-arched windows with architraves, pulvinated friezes, voussoirs, and cornices. In the centre of the upper floor is an Ionic Venetian window with pilasters and a pulvinated frieze. The pavilions have rusticated quoins and semi-domed niches with keystones.	II
Pair of bridges near Abbey House; 53.40300°N 1.18575°W	—	Mid 18th century	The bridges were designed by Lancelet 'Capability' Brown for the Sandbeck Park estate. They are in magnesian limestone, and each has a single span crossing a stream with an island in the middle.	II
Malpas Hill Cottages; 53.40668°N 1.11615°W	—	Mid 18th century	A pair of limestone cottages with a pantile roof. There are two storeys, three bays, and single-storey extensions at the ends. There are two doorways with bonded surrounds, and the windows are casements. At the rear are blocked slit vents.	II
Park House; 53.39311°N 1.13731°W	—	18th century	A house that was later extended, in stuccoed limestone, on a plinth, with chamfered quoins, a floor band, an eaves cornice, and a pantile roof with coped gables and shaped kneelers. There is an L-shaped plan, with a main range of two storeys and an attic and three bays, a wing on the rear right with two storeys and three bays, and a later extension. The central doorway has an architrave and a cornice, and is flanked by two-storey bay windows. Elsewhere, there are sash, casement and dormer windows.	II
Farmbuilding north of Sandbeck Park Stables; 53.40809°N 1.14750°W	—	Mid 18th century	A barn and cowhouse in limestone, with quoins, and a pantile roof with coped gables and shaped kneelers. There are two storeys, seven bays, and two outshuts on the front. Over the middle bay is a pedimented gable with an oculus in the tympanum. In the centre is an arched wagon entry with imposts and a keystone, and at the rear is a large Diocletian window.	II
Yews Farmhouse; 53.39342°N 1.13864°W	—	18th century	The farmhouse is in limestone on a plinth, with sill bands, stone slate eaves courses, and a pantile roof with coped gables and shaped kneelers. There are two storeys, three bays, and a rear wing on the left. Steps lead up to the central doorway that has a rusticated surround and a cornice, flanked by canted bay windows containing sashes with fluted pilasters. In the upper floor is a central Venetian window that has an archivolt with a keystone and blind outer lights, and this is flanked by tripartite sash windows.	II
Four Lane Ends Lodge and gateway 53.39895°N 1.15067°W		c. 1760	The lodge and gateway are at the entrance to the grounds of Sandbeck Park, and are in magnesian limestone. The lodge has a sill band, an eaves band, and a hipped Westmorland slate roof. It has a single storey and a front of two bays, the left bay a projecting cross-wing, and the windows are casements in round-arched openings. To the right, wing walls link to an entrance with wrought iron gates. The entrance is flanked by gate piers, each with a plinth, a rusticated shaft, a band, a block with paterae, a pedimented cornice, and a cup with a pineapple finial.	II
Central block of cottages north of Home Farm; 53.40138°N 1.15466°W	—	c. 1760	The central block of a row of cottages is in magnesian limestone on a plinth, with rusticated quoins, an eaves cornice, and a hipped Welsh slate roof. There are two storeys and three bays. In the centre is a rusticated round arch with a keystone infilled with a casement window. The outer bays contain casement windows, and in the middle of the top floor is an oculus with an architrave and keystones.	II
Malpas Hill Gateway; 53.40613°N 1.11614°W		c. 1760	The gateway to the grounds of Sandbeck Park was designed by James Paine, and is in magnesian limestone with wrought iron gates. It consists of a triumphal arch, consisting of a central arched carriage entrance and flanking arched side gates with end piers. The central arch has a fluted impost band, an archivolt, and a coffered soffit with festooned paterae in the spandrels, under a dentilled pediment. The impost band continues as a cornice over the side gates and links to the end piers that have frieze blocks, and sunken panels with paterae, and cornices with flattened-dome copings. These are flanked by quadrant walls with copings, each with three rusticated intermediate piers and end piers.	II*
The Limes; 53.40897°N 1.15675°W	—	c. 1760	The original stables to Sandbeck Park, the building was remodelled into a gamekeeper's lodge by James Paine. It is in magnesian limestone on a plinth, with rusticated quoins and a Welsh slate roof. The central block has two storeys and three bays, and is flanked by single-bay wings, one with two storeys and the other with one. The middle bays project under a pediment, and contain a round-headed sash window with a rusticated surround and a keystone flanked by taller recessed round-headed panels. Above is an oculus with a keyed architrave flanked by sash windows. The wings have hipped roofs and contain sash windows.	II
Sandbeck Park Stables; 53.40694°N 1.14704°W	—	1765–66	The stables to Sandbeck Park were designed by James Paine, and are in magnesian limestone with roofs of Westmorland slate, partly replaced by Welsh slate and pantiles. They form a quadrilateral plan facing west, with wings extending from the front left and rear right corners. The west range has a plinth, two storeys and seven bays. In the centre is a clock tower containing a round arch with an impost band, above which is a balustraded cornice, a clock face with an architrave, an eaves cornice, and a hipped roof with a wooden bellcote and a weathervane. This is flanked by three-storey turrets, each with a sash window, an upper storey with an inward-facing oculus, and a hipped roof with a finial.	II*
Kingwood View; 53.42263°N 1.20643°W		Mid to late 18th century	The house is in limestone, with chamfered quoins, a floor band, an eaves cornice, and a pantile roof with coped gables and shaped kneelers. There are three storeys, three bays, and a parallel rear range. The central doorway has a slight chamfer, and the windows are casements with keystones, the middle window in the top floor blind.	II
Sandbeck Lodge Farmhouse; 53.41691°N 1.16279°W	—	Mid to late 18th century	The farmhouse is in magnesian limestone on a plinth, with rusticated quoins, an eaves cornice, and a pantile roof with coped gables and shaped kneelers. There are two storeys, five bays, the middle three bays projecting under a shallow pediment, and three rear gabled wings. The central doorway has a quoined surround, a semicircular fanlight, an impost band, an archivolt, and a keystone, and is flanked by round-headed sash windows. Apart from a small casement window in the left bay, the other windows are sashes, the window above the doorway is blind, and at the rear is a stair window with a keystone.	II
Ha-ha south of Sandbeck Park; 53.40540°N 1.14410°W	—	c. 1771–73	The ha-ha to the south of the house is in magnesian limestone. It consists of a dry stone wall surmounted by an overhanging course. It runs eastwards from a position about 80 metres (260 ft) to the south of the house.	II
Ha-ha west of Sandbeck Park; 53.40591°N 1.14743°W	—	c. 1771–73	The ha-ha to the west of the house is in magnesian limestone. It consists of a dry stone wall surmounted by an overhanging course, and curves about 100 metres (330 ft) from the house. The ha-ha contains a set of steps, and at one point forms a bastion.	II
Barn southeast of Sandbeck Lodge Farmhouse; 53.41668°N 1.16234°W		Late 18th century	The barn is in limestone, with quoins, and a pantile roof with coped gables and shaped kneelers. There are two storeys and five bays. In the ground floor are segmental-arched wagon entries with quoined surrounds, slit vents, and an inserted window, and the upper floor contains a door, a hatch, and other openings.	II
Garden House; 53.40904°N 1.14604°W	—	Late 18th century	The garden house in the Sandbeck Park estate is in red brick, and has a sheet asbestos roof, with coped gables and shaped kneelers. There are two storeys, three bays, and a continuous two-storey rear outshut. In the front is a brick porch, and the windows are sashes with cambered arches and keystones.	II
Gate piers and wing walls, Roundhouse Lodge; 53.40914°N 1.14866°W	—	Late 18th century	The pair of gate piers, and the walls attached to the lodge in the Sandbeck Park estate, are in magnesian limestone. The piers are large, and each has a plinth, a rusticated shaft, a band, a pedimented frieze block with paterae, and a ribbed cup with a pineapple finial. The wing walls have a plinth and copings.	II
Cowhouse southwest of Abbey Farmhouse; 53.40388°N 1.18498°W	—	c. 1800	The cowhouse with a hayloft and dovecote are in limestone, with a sill band, and a pantile roof. There are two storeys and five bays, the middle bay projecting under a pediment with an oculus in the tympanum. The middle bay contains a rusticated round-arched entrance, the outer bays contain doorways with fanlights, and in the bays between and the upper floor are casement windows.	II
Roche Abbey Mill Farmhouse; 53.40205°N 1.17229°W	—	c. 1800	The farmhouse is in magnesian limestone, with quoins, a sill band, an eaves cornice, stone slate eaves courses, and a pantile roof with coped gables and shaped kneelers. There are two storeys, three bays, with a pediment over the middle bay, a rear wing on the left, and later additions. The central doorway has a cornice, and the windows are casements.	II
Ice House in Folds Wood; 53.40634°N 1.12260°W	—	Late 18th or early 19th century	The ice house in the grounds of Sandbeck Park is in limestone, it has a brick-lined vault, and is covered in earth. On the northwest side is a doorway leading to a brick-lined tunnel.	II
Sets of steps, Sandbeck Park; 53.40591°N 1.14526°W	—	Late 18th or early 19th century	There are three sets of steps, two to the south of the house, and one at the north end of the east terrace. They are in magnesian limestone, and each has six steps flanked by plain ramped kerbs.	II
Outbuilding and bridge southwest of Yews Mill House; 53.39183°N 1.13426°W		1806	A small watermill and a bridge, the bridge being the older. The mill is in magnesian limestone and has a roof of pantile and stone slate, with coped gables, kneelers, crocketed pinnacles, and a ball finial. There are two storeys and two bays. The mill is in Gothick style, the two doorways and the casement windows have pointed arches, and on the right side is a round arch into the wheel pit. The attached bridge has a single segmental arch with the date on one voussoir, and no parapet.	II
Abbey House; 53.40291°N 1.18533°W		c. 1807 (probable)	Originally the custodian's house to Roche Abbey, it is in magnesian limestone on a chamfered plinth, with a floor band, an eaves band, and an embattled parapet with moulded merlons, and crocketed pinnacles at the ends. The house is in Gothick style, and has two storeys and an attic, and an L-shaped plan, consisting of a three-bay range, and a rear wing on the right. In the centre is a doorway with a pointed arch, a moulded surround, and a fanlight. To its right is a canted bay window with an embattled parapet, and the other windows are casements with pointed heads.	II
Sandbeck Chapel; 53.40676°N 1.14584°W		1869–70	The private chapel to Sandbeck Park, it was designed by Benjamin Ferrey in High Victorian Gothic style. It is built in magnesian limestone with slate roofs, and consists of a nave with a north porch, and a chancel with an apse. At the west end is a wheel window, and on the roof is a sanctus bell and a ventilator.	II
Milepost at east end of Stone Green; 53.40186°N 1.16492°W		Late 19th century	The milepost is on the northeast side of the A634 road at the east end of Stone Green. It consists of a gritstone pillar with cast iron overlay, and has a triangular section and a rounded top. On the top is inscribed "ROTHERHAM & BARNBY MOOR ROAD" and "YEWS", and on the sides are the distances to Rotherham and Barnby Moor.	II
Milepost near Gypsy Lane; 53.40796°N 1.18592°W		Late 19th century	The milepost is on the southwest side of the A634 road near Gypsy Lane. It consists of a gritstone pillar with cast iron overlay, and has a triangular section and a rounded top. On the top is inscribed "ROTHERHAM & BARNBY MOOR ROAD" and "YEWS", and on the sides are the distances to Rotherham and Barnby Moor.	II
Milepost near Morrell Street; 53.41885°N 1.20026°W		Late 19th century	The milepost is on the southwest side of Blyth Road (A634 road) near Morrell Street. It consists of a gritstone pillar with cast iron overlay, and has a triangular section and a rounded top. On the top is inscribed "ROTHERHAM & BARNBY MOOR ROAD" and "MALTBY", and on the sides are the distances to Rotherham and Barnby Moor.	II
Milepost near the entrance to Maltby Colliery; 53.42167°N 1.17861°W		Late 19th century	The milepost is on the south side of Tickhill Road (A631 road) near the entrance to Maltby Colliery. It consists of a gritstone pillar with cast iron overlay, and has a triangular section and a rounded top. On the top is inscribed "BAWTRY & TINSLEY ROAD" and "MALTBY", and on the sides are the distances to Sheffield, Tinsley, Rotherham, Bawtry, and Tickhill.	II
Milepost opposite Addison Road; 53.42226°N 1.22514°W		Late 19th century	The milepost is on the south side of Rotherham Road (A631 road) opposite the junction with Addison Road. It consists of a gritstone pillar with cast iron overlay, and has a triangular section and a rounded top. On the top is inscribed "BAWTRY & TINSLEY ROAD" and "MALTBY", and on the sides are the distances to Sheffield, Tinsley, Rotherham, Barnby Moor, Bawtry, and Tickhill.	II
Maltby War Memorial; 53.41818°N 1.20013°W		1924	The war memorial is in granite, on a base of three steps, it is square and has circular engaged columns at the corners, and a pedimented cornice surmounted by a finial consisting of a squat column with a crown. There are inscriptions on the pediment, on the sides are the names of those lost in the First World War, and on the steps are bronze plaques with the names of those lost in the Second World War. The memorial stands on a square podium, and is enclosed by kerb stones in a hexagonal paved area.	II
