= Hooton Levitt =

Village and civil parish in South Yorkshire, England

Coordinates: 53.4177°N 1.2174°W

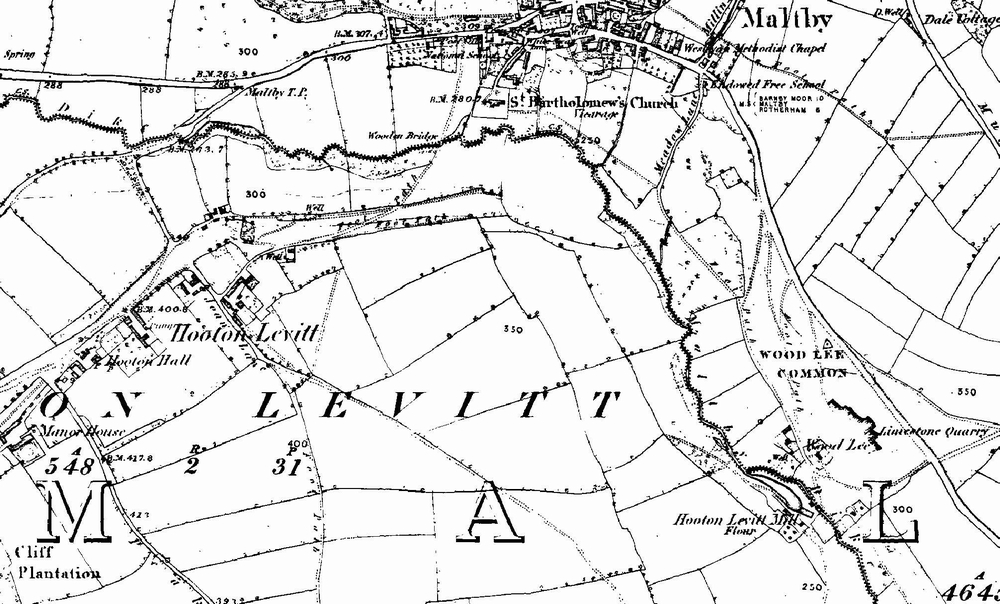
Detail of map of South Yorkshire showing Hooton Levitt, circa 1855

Hooton Levitt (sometimes spelled Hooton Levett) is a village and civil parish in the Metropolitan Borough of Rotherham in South Yorkshire, England; one of four villages in the county that carry the name of Hooton, meaning 'farmstead on a spur of land'. It has a population of 110, increasing to 132 at the 2011 Census.

Hooton Levitt (or Levett) carries the manorial affix of the de Livet family, an ancient Norman family that gained control of the manor in the 12th century after marriage with the granddaughter of Richard FitzTurgis (later 'de Wickersley'), lord of the manors of Hooton and Wickersley and co-founder of nearby Roche Abbey.

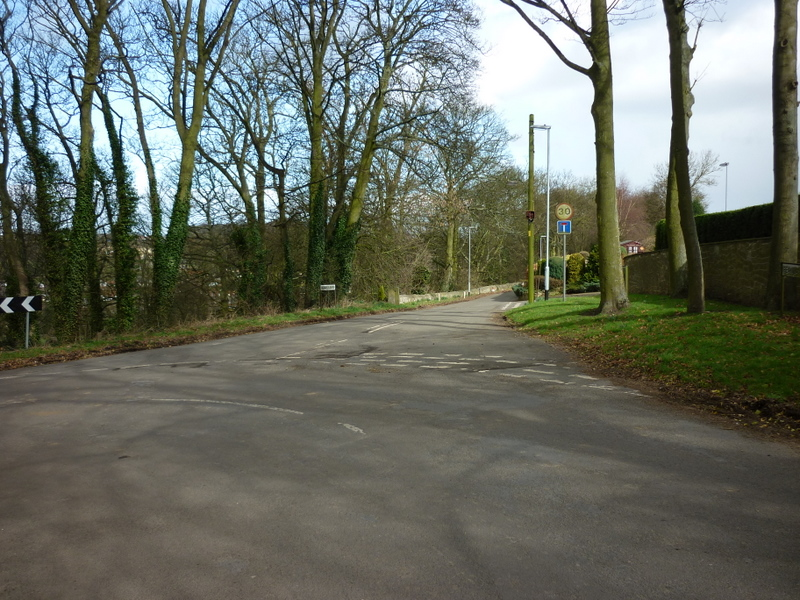
View of Joan Lane, Hooton Levitt

It is likely that the Levetts of Yorkshire, who gave their surname to the village of Hooton, originated in Sussex, where the family had initially held land and where their holdings were in the area of Sussex controlled by the Earls Warenne, among the most powerful of the Norman nobility, who held an immense baronial holding in Yorkshire stretching to Lancashire and Cheshire. William de Livet was a witness for a deed of about 1200 in which William de Warenne, 5th Earl of Surrey, confirmed a grant to Kirklees Nunnery by Reyner le Fleming, lord of the manor of Clifton.

Samuel Lewis describes Hooton Levett in his 1848 A Topographical Dictionary of England as "a township, in the parish of Maltby, union of Rotherham, S. division of the wapentake of Strafforth and Tickhill, W. riding of York, 5¼ miles (W. S. W.) from Tickhill; containing 76 inhabitants. It derives the affix to its name from the family of Levett, who held lands here, up to about the time of Henry V. The township comprises by computation 470 acres; the soil is favourable, and the scenery pleasing."

== See also ==
- Listed buildings in Hooton Levitt
- William Levett (baron)

== See also ==
- William Levett (baron)
