= William Levett =

William Levett may refer to:

- William Levett (courtier), long-serving courtier to King Charles I of England
- William Levett (baron) (1200–1270), lord of the manor of the South Yorkshire village of Hooton Levitt
- William Levett (rector of Buxted) (c. 1495–1554), English clergyman
- William Levett (dean of Bristol) (died 1694), Oxford-educated personal chaplain to Edward Hyde, 1st Earl of Clarendon

== See also ==
- William Levitt, American real estate developer
