= Richard Lumley, 12th Earl of Scarbrough =

English nobleman

Richard Aldred Lumley, 12th Earl of Scarbrough (5 December 1932 – 23 March 2004), styled Viscount Lumley between 1945 and 1969, was an English nobleman.

== Education and military service ==
The eldest son of Roger Lumley, 11th Earl of Scarbrough, Lumley was educated at St Peter's Court, where he became a friend of Adrian Swire and Houston Shaw Stewart, and later at Eton College. He did his national service as a second lieutenant in the 11th Hussars, receiving his commission on 3 November 1951, and was educated at Magdalen College, Oxford. On 30 September 1952, he was transferred from the national service list to the Queen's Own Yorkshire Dragoons, with seniority from his original date of commission. He was made an acting lieutenant on 12 June 1953. Lumley was commissioned a Territorial Army lieutenant with the Dragoons on 5 December 1955, with seniority from the date of his acting lieutenancy, which he relinquished on 18 July 1956. He received a short service commission as a second lieutenant in the Royal Armored Corps on 26 March 1956, which he relinquished on 20 July, when he was promoted to lieutenant in the Regular Army Reserve.

During 1956, Lumley served as aide-de-camp to the Governor of Cyprus, Sir John Harding. Here he befriended Lawrence Durrell. Lumley was well-liked for his honesty and intelligence among the British correspondents with whom he had to deal there. He was later the honorary colonel of the 1st Battalion Yorkshire Volunteers from 1 December 1975 to 1 December 1988, and president of the Northern Area of The Royal British Legion.

== Landowner and preservationist ==
After leaving the Army, Lumley took part in horseracing as a member of the Jockey Club and a steward at Doncaster and York. He succeeded his father in 1969. In 1970 he married Lady Elizabeth Anne Ramsay, oldest child and daughter of Simon Ramsay, 16th Earl of Dalhousie, and had four children and one granddaughter:

- Richard Osbert Lumley, 13th Earl of Scarbrough (born 1973)
- Hon. Frederick Henry Lumley (27 August 1975 – 28 August 1975)
- Hon. Thomas Henry Lumley (born 1980), an artist, served as a Page of Honour
- Lady Rose Frederica Lily Lumley (born 1981) she married Thomas Michael Cole. They have one daughter:
  - Freya Sarah Cole (12 March 2014)

Widely respected by the inhabitants around Sandbeck, he joined the miners in protesting a proposed closure of Maltby pit.

He was forced to sell furniture to meet his father's death duties, and thereafter he and his wife worked to restore and preserve the family estates at Sandbeck Park and Lumley Castle. He transformed the latter into a hotel, reinvesting the profits into its upkeep. Largely self-taught, he had a wide knowledge of architecture and furnishings, a talent recognized in his service as president of the York Georgian Society from 1985 to 1992 and the Northern Association of Building Societies from 1985 to 1995. He was also vice-president of the British Conservation Trust for Volunteers, an honorary member of the Royal Institute of British Architects, and from 1983, a trustee of the Leeds Castle Foundation. From 1994 to 2003, he served on the Royal Commission on Historical Manuscripts.

On 8 January 1974, he was appointed a deputy lieutenant of the West Riding of Yorkshire, became Vice-Lieutenant of South Yorkshire on 24 September 1990, and finally Lord Lieutenant of South Yorkshire from 1996 until his death. In July 1996, he was appointed a Knight of St John. He died of cancer on 23 March 2004 at age 71 at Sandbeck and was succeeded by his eldest son Richard.

Honorary titles
Preceded by Sir Hugh Neill	Lord Lieutenant of South Yorkshire; 1996–2004	Succeeded by David Moody
Peerage of England
Preceded by Roger Lumley	Earl of Scarbrough; 1969–2004	Succeeded by Richard Lumley
