= Listed buildings in Hooton Levitt =

Hooton Levitt is a civil parish in the Metropolitan Borough of Rotherham, South Yorkshire, England. The parish contains five listed buildings that are recorded in the National Heritage List for England. All the listed buildings are designated at Grade II, the lowest of the three grades, which is applied to "buildings of national importance and special interest". The parish contains the village of Hooton Levitt, and is otherwise rural. The listed buildings include a farmhouse with an attached former watermill, and all the others are farm buildings.

== Buildings ==
Name and location	Photograph	Date	Notes
Farm building, Manor House Farm; 53.41592°N 1.21989°W	—	Late medieval (probable)	The farm building, which was later extended and altered, is in limestone with quoins and a pantile roof. There are two storeys and three cells. In the earlier part are external steps, and round-headed slit windows with quoined surrounds. The later part contains shallow-arched doorways and double-chamfered windows.
Farm building, Home Farm; 53.41781°N 1.21673°W	—	Early 18th century	The farm building consists of a cowhouse and stables with a hayloft. It is in limestone, with quoins, stone slate eaves courses, and a pantile roof with coped gables and shaped kneelers. There are two storeys and seven bays. The building contains doorways, segmental-arched casement windows, and external stone steps incorporating a dog kennel, and at the rear is a flight of external brick steps.
House and mill building, Mill Farm; 53.41483°N 1.19944°W	—	Late 18th century (probable)	The farmhouse and attached former water mill are in limestone, and have pantile roofs with coped gables and shaped kneelers. The house has two storeys and two bays, a central porch, and segmental-arched casement windows. The mill to the right is higher, with two storeys and a loft and two bays. It contains doorways and windows, all with segmental-arched heads, and in the right return is a round-arched opening to the wheel pit.
Cartshed, Mill Farm; 53.41497°N 1.19940°W	—	Early to mid 19th century	The cartshed is in limestone, and has a pantile roof with coped gables and shaped kneelers. There is a single storey, three bays, and a lean-to extension on the right. The middle bay contains a round arch, and there are lower round arches in the outer bays.
Farm building, Mill Farm; 53.41485°N 1.19994°W	—	Early to mid 19th century	A combination farm building, including a stable, a hayloft, a cowhouse, and a dovecote, it is in limestone, and has a pantile roof with coped gables and shaped kneelers. There are two storeys and a partial loft, and four bays The openings include doorways and a stable window, each with a segmental arch. External steps lead up to an upper floor doorway, and there is a hatch, slit vents, and a ledge to the dovecote.
