= Richard Lumley, 13th Earl of Scarbrough =

British peer and landowner

The Right Honourable The Earl of Scarbrough DL
- Born: 18 May 1973 (age 52)
- Spouse: Henrietta Boyson (m. 2007)
- Father: Richard Lumley

Richard Osbert Lumley, 13th Earl of Scarbrough DL (born 18 May 1973), known as Viscount Lumley until 2004, is a British peer and landowner.

== Biography ==
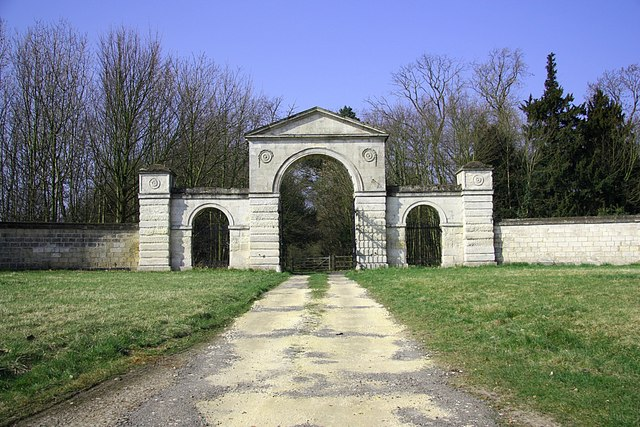
An entrance to Sandbeck Park

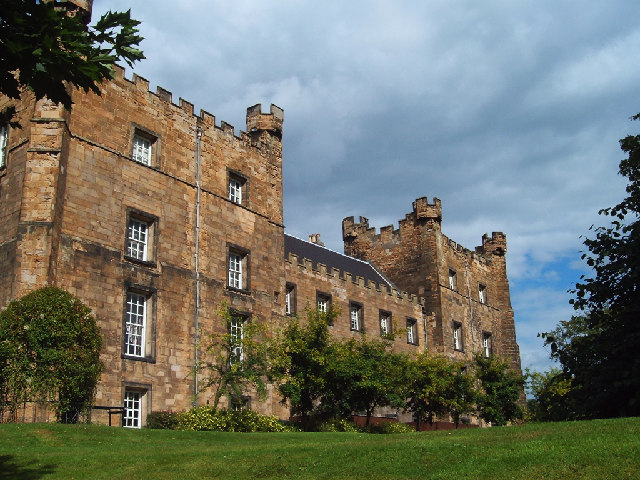
Lumley Castle Hotel

The elder son of Richard Lumley, 12th Earl of Scarbrough, and his wife Lady Elizabeth, Lumley was educated at Eton College and was a Page of Honour to Queen Elizabeth the Queen Mother from 1 March 1989 to 1 January 1991. He succeeded his father in 2004. In 2007, he married Henrietta Elfrida Helen Boyson. Scarbrough was appointed a Deputy Lord Lieutenant of South Yorkshire on 11 April 2011.

He lives at Sandbeck Park, near Maltby, South Yorkshire, and takes an active part in local charities, including serving as Patron of the Sheffield Royal Society for the Blind. The Sandbeck Park estate was reported in 2007 to cover about 5,000 acres. The house is near Maltby Colliery, a large deep coal mine which closed in 2013.

Scarbrough also owns the former family seat of Lumley Castle, which is now a hotel and restaurant. In 2013, it had 73 bedrooms.

Court offices
Preceded by Andrew Harry Lillingston	Page of Honour to Queen Elizabeth The Queen Mother; 1989–1991	Succeeded by John Alexander George Carew-Pole
Peerage of England
Preceded by Richard Lumley	Earl of Scarbrough; 2004–present	Incumbent; Heir presumptive: Hon. Thomas Lumley
