= Listed buildings in Hellaby =

Hellaby is a civil parish in the Metropolitan Borough of Rotherham, South Yorkshire, England. The parish contains two listed buildings that are recorded in the National Heritage List for England. Of these, one is listed at Grade II*, the middle of the three grades, and the other is at Grade II, the lowest grade. The listed buildings consist of a large house converted into a hotel, and its former stable.

== Key ==
Grade	Criteria
II*	Particularly important buildings of more than special interest
II	Buildings of national importance and special interest

== Buildings ==
Name and location	Photograph	Date	Notes	Grade
Hellaby Hall; 53.42484°N 1.24028°W		c. 1690	A large house, later a hotel, it is in limestone on a plinth, with quoins, a floor band, and a pantile roof with a coped shaped gable and Baroque-style kneelers. There are two storeys, an attic and a basement, a front of five bays, three bays on the sides, and a lower two-bay wing at the rear on the left. Steps lead up to the central doorway that has Doric pilasters, an architrave, a keystone, and an open segmental pediment. The windows are sashes, those in the lower floors with aprons, and the three attic windows with cornices.	II*
Stable, Hellaby Hall; 53.42503°N 1.24004°W	—	Early 18th century	The former stable is in limestone with quoins and a pantile roof. There are two storeys and five bays. The openings include two doorways with quoined surrounds and rusticated segmental arches, and in the upper floor are a hatch and another doorway.	II
