= Hellaby =

Village and civil parish in South Yorkshire, England

Coordinates: 53.4250°N 1.2449°W

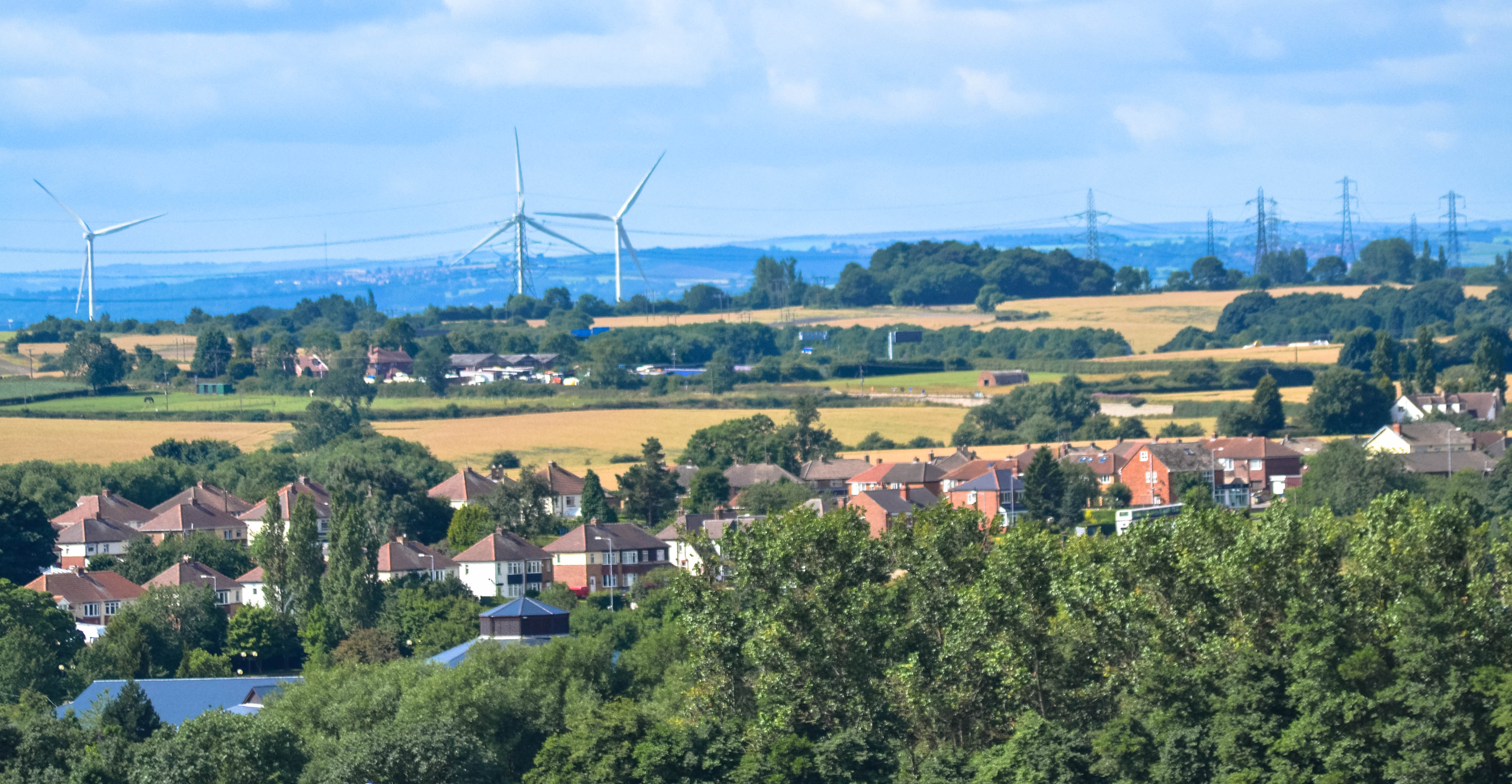
- Houses in Hellaby

- Location within South Yorkshire
- Population: 825 (2011 census)
  - London: 145 mi (233 km) south
- Civil parish: Hellaby
- Metropolitan borough: Rotherham
- Metropolitan county: South Yorkshire
- Region: Yorkshire and the Humber
- Country: England
- Sovereign state: United Kingdom
- Post town: ROTHERHAM
- Postcode district: S66
- Dialling code: 01709
- Police: South Yorkshire
- Fire: South Yorkshire
- Ambulance: Yorkshire
- UK Parliament: Rother Valley

Hellaby is a village and civil parish in the Metropolitan Borough of Rotherham, South Yorkshire, England. The population of the civil parish at the 2011 census was 825. It is situated 5 miles (8 km) east from the centre of Rotherham and forms a continuous urban area with Maltby, separated from the rest of Rotherham by Junction 1 (Bramley Interchange) of the M18. It is situated by Hellaby Brook and, whilst signposted as "Hellaby Village", the parish has no school, church or post office.

== History ==
The name Hellaby is formed from "Helgebi", the Domesday orthography by which Norman scribes attempted to express a sound. "Helgebi" was noted in the Domesday Book of 1086 as being within the Parish of Stainton and entrusted by Roger de Busli, who was instrumental in the founding of nearby Roche Abbey, whose foundations were laid in 1147.

The Hull and Barnsley and Great Central Joint Railway considered building a station in the village, but only a goods siding was eventually opened.

== Community ==
=== Parish council ===
In 2011 Hellaby was split from Bramley to become a separate civil parish. A parish council was created with 5 councillors, and the first election was held on 5 May 2011.

=== Religion ===
Hellaby has the octagonal East Pennines Assembly Hall, dedicated in 1986, which serves the Jehovah's Witness community of the surrounding area. There is no parish church.

=== Hellaby Community Hall ===
There have been recent moves to sell the land where Hellaby local community hall (unused since 2007) is situated. After the 2007 closure a developer planned to demolish it. Applications for planning permission were made in 2008 and 2011. Local residents protested as it is the last of the local facilities in the village. Both applications were withdrawn.

Centenary Hall reopened to the public in 2011 following a period of repair.

== Sport ==
A short lived greyhound racing track was opened south of where Cumwell Lane meets Bateman Road on 7 April 1928. The racing was independent (not affiliated to the sports governing body the National Greyhound Racing Club) and was known as a flapping track, which was the nickname given to independent tracks. The outline of the track can still be seen from the air today, with many trees now occupying the centre of the track, despite the fact that it closed during the early 1930s.

== See also ==
- Listed buildings in Hellaby
