= Sandbeck Park =

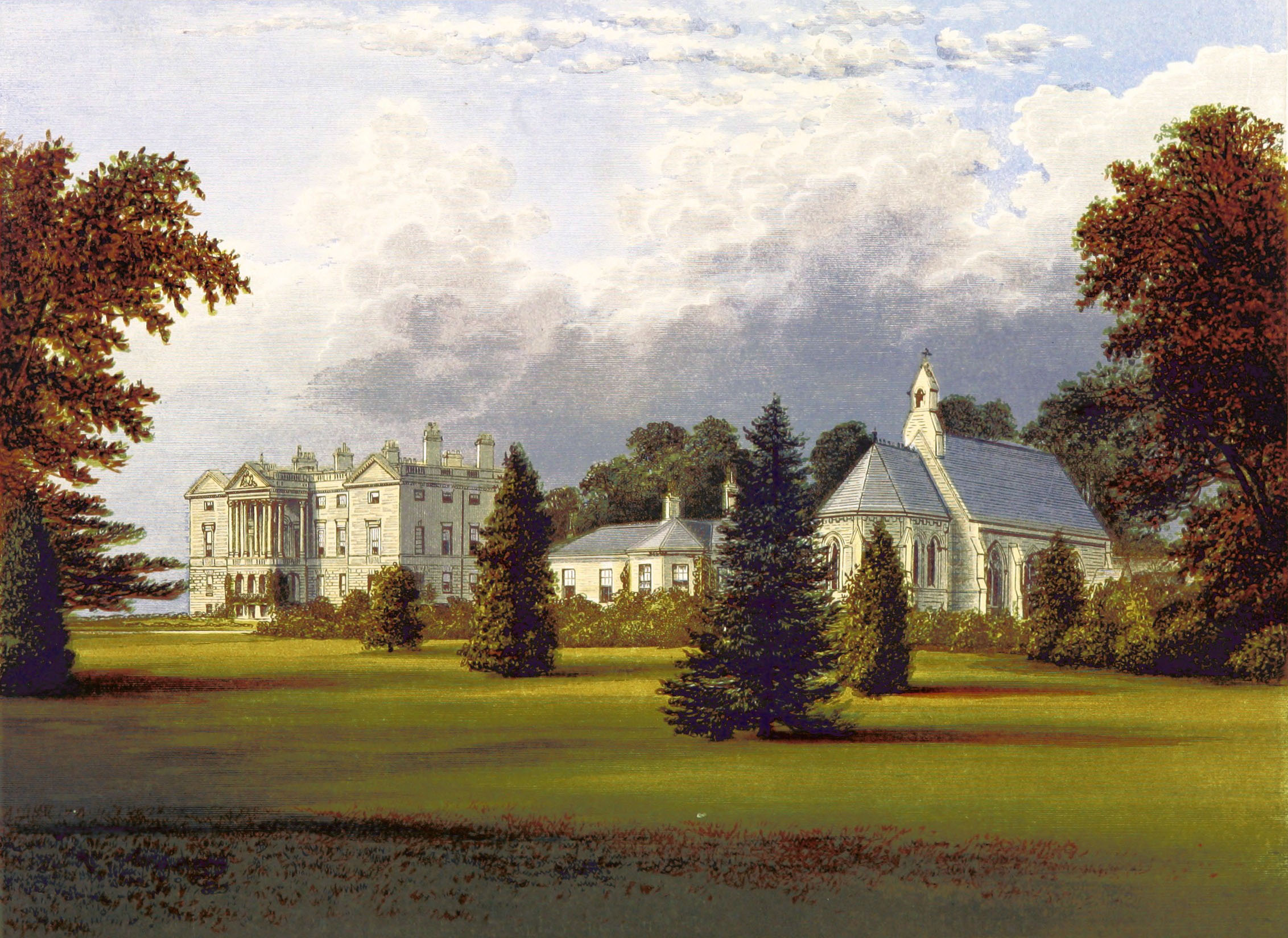
- Sandbeck Park, c. 1880

- Location within South Yorkshire

General information
- Type: Country house
- Architectural style: Neo-Palladian
- Location: Maltby, South Yorkshire
- Coordinates: 53.406166°N 1.145605°W
- Current tenants: Richard Lumley, 13th Earl of Scarbrough
- Completed: 1626
- Renovated: c. 1763–68; 1857
- Client: Sir Nicholas Saunderson, 1st Viscount Castleton

Renovating team
- Architects: James Paine; William Burn

Listed Building – Grade I
- Designated: 13 November 1959
- Reference no.: 1314665

Sandbeck Park is a Neo-Palladian country house in Maltby, South Yorkshire, England. The house dates to the 17th century and was extensively expanded and remodeled in the 18th and 19th centuries. The house is Grade I listed with Historic England and several outbuildings on the estate are also listed. The house has been the seat of the Earls of Scarbrough since the 18th century. The garden was designed by Lancelot Brown and is also Grade II* listed.

== Etymology ==
The name Sandbeck – alternatively spelled in the 13th century as Sandbec (1241), Sandebek (1276), and Sandebeck (1297) – is from Old English sand + Old Norse bekkr (stream).

== History ==
Sandbeck Park lies near the now ruined Roche Abbey, founded in 1147 by Cistercian monks, and approximately 2 miles (3 km) southeast of Maltby. The grounds contain a large wood once known as Roche Wood that is now called King's Wood.

The first record of Sandbeck is in a document dated 1222, in which it is mentioned among the lands given by Alice (or Alix), Countess of Eu to Robert de Vieuxpont and his wife Idonea, daughter and heir of John de Busli. Idonea gave the manor of Sandbeck to the monks of Roche Abbey by deed on Saint Giles Day (1 September) 1241.

However, this donation was later unsuccessfully disputed by her grandson Robert de Vipont, at some point between 1238 and 1254, as a document exists with witnesses certifying her gift to the monks was made of sound mind. The monks' right to the manor was again challenged by Robert de Vipont in 1265, when a jury concluded that the Abbot of Roche had not "intruded himself into the manor of Sandbec" during a time of de Vipont's struggles in England, but had possession of the property beforehand.

After the Dissolution of the Monasteries between 1536 and 1541, the manor at Sandbeck was sold to Richard Turke of London, who sold it to Robert Saunderson in 1552. His son Nicholas Saunderson, 1st Viscount Castleton either built a new house or added to an existing structure, c. 1626. "Nycholas Saunderson" is listed as residing at Sandbeck as far back as the late 16th century. A contract dated February 1626 calls for mason Richard Marshall of Ashby, Lincolnshire to "undertake & begin a new house of the said Sir Nicholas Sanderson at Sandbeck in the County of Yorke where it is lefte & bring up the rough walls chimneys & gavell ends & all other work thereof belonginge to the bonde of a rough mason until the whole worke to be finished with bringinge up of the walls."

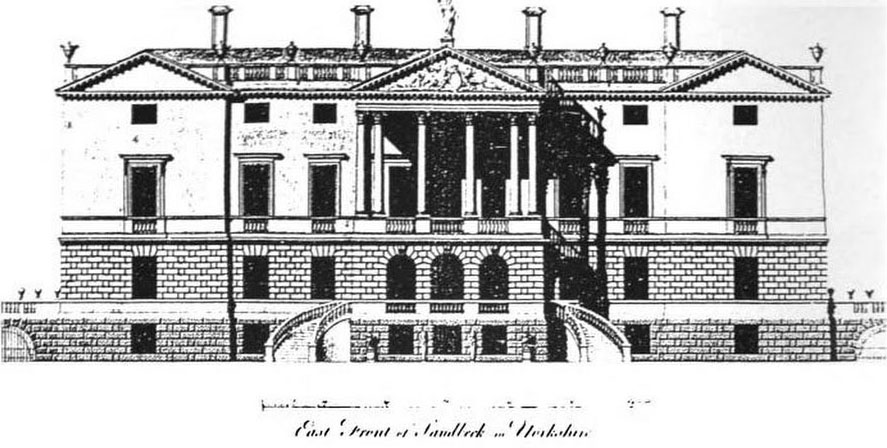
A sketch of Sandbeck Park by architect James Paine

In 1637, the second Viscount Castleton received a royal licence to build a deer park from King Charles I. It was the last known local royal licence granted for a deer park.

Sandbeck remained in the hands of the Castletons until 1723, when the sixth viscount, who was granted an earldom in 1720, died without an heir. He willed Sandbeck to his maternal cousin, Thomas Lumley, the third Earl of Scarborough, who added the Saunderson surname by royal licence. Sandbeck Park has remained the family seat of the Earls of Scarbrough ever since.

The fourth earl hired Neoclassical architect James Paine to considerably rebuild and extend the house in the fashionable Neo-Palladian style. Paine enlarged the main building with a new Grecian front, and added several outbuildings, including gatehouses and the limestone stables c. 1763–68. He used stone from Roche Abbey in his construction of the house.

In 1774, the fourth earl commissioned Capability Brown to completely landscape the area, signing a contract to pay him £2,800 for work to last through 1777. Brown showed little regard to the archaeological significance of Roche Abbey; he "extensively demolished the remaining buildings, constructed huge earth terraces, and turfed across the entire site, leaving only the two transepts as 'romantic' features in the grounds."

In 1857, the ninth earl hired William Burn to further remodel and improve the house. In 1869, Benjamin Ferrey built a private chapel for the earl. A 19th-century service wing that linked the house to Sandbeck Chapel was demolished in 1954.

== Today ==
The house remains the private residence of the current head of the family, Richard Lumley, 13th Earl of Scarbrough, who takes an active part in local charities, including serving as Patron of the Sheffield Royal Society for the Blind. The Sandbeck Park Estate is approximately 5,000 acres. Today King's Wood is noted for its abundance of large-leave lime; the 11th Earl substantially replanted the depleted King's Wood after the Second World War.

== Listed buildings ==
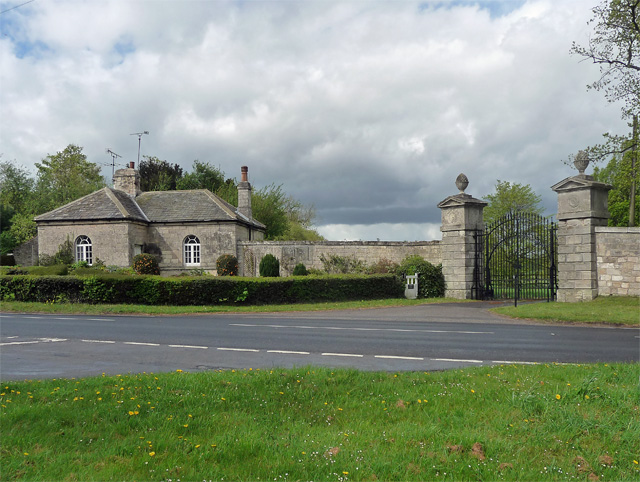
Gatehouse, designed by James Paine

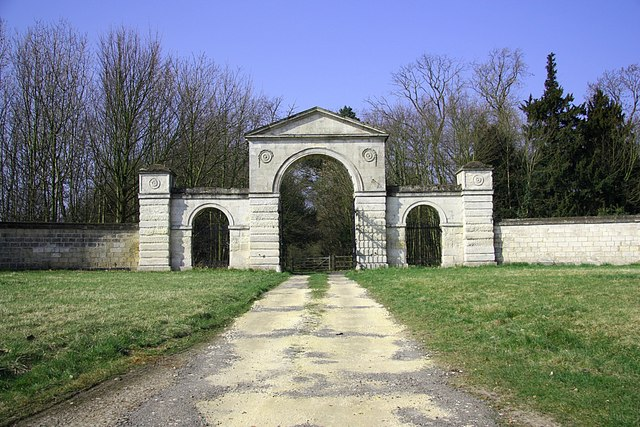
Malpas Hill Gateway

- Sandbeck Park stables (Grade II*)
- Sandbeck Park garden (Grade II*)
- Malpas Hill Gateway (Grade II*)
- Sandbeck Chapel (Grade II)
- Two Ha-has (Grade II)
- Barn (Grade II)
- Icehouse (Grade II)
- Gatehouse (Grade II)
- Gamekeeper's House (Grade II)
- Malpas Hill Cottages (Grade II)
- Gatepiers and wall at Roundhouse Lodge (Grade II)
- Sandbeck Lodge (Grade II)

== See also ==
- Grade I listed buildings in South Yorkshire
- Listed buildings in Maltby, South Yorkshire
