= William Levett (baron) =

Anglo-Norman nobleman

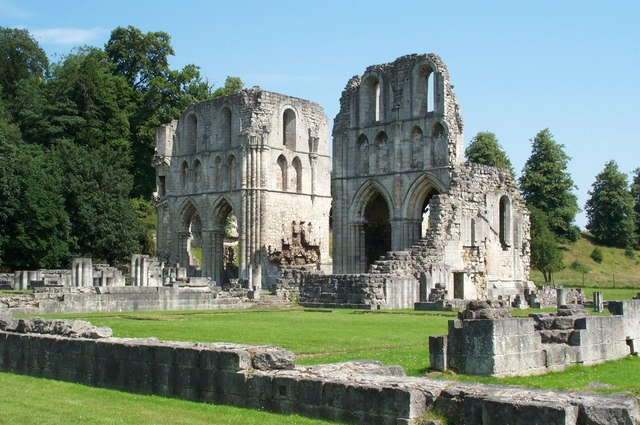
Roche Abbey, founded by Richard FitzTurgis, ancestor of the Levett family

William Levett (also spelled William de Livet) (c. 1200 – c. 1270) was lord of the manor of the South Yorkshire village of Hooton Levitt, a village named in part for his ancestors, and became the owner of the patronage of Roche Abbey on marriage to the granddaughter of the Abbey's cofounder Richard FitzTurgis, a Norman baron who co-founded Roche with the great-nephew of one of England's most powerful Norman barons, Roger de Busli.

Levett (also spelled de Livet, de Lyvet, Levet) was likely born in Hooton Levitt, the son of Nicholas de Lyvet, the lord of the manor. There were four Hootons in Yorkshire, the name meaning 'a farmstead on a spur of land,' from the Old Norse.

Hooton Levitt was a tiny village, bordering on Nottingham Forest. As late as 1379, it had only 30 taxpayers. What made it valuable were its quarries, and those controlled by the nearby Cistercian Abbey of Roche. It was these quarries, and others like them nearby, that would later supply the grinding stones necessary to the cutlery industry that emerged at nearby Sheffield, and that in the meantime supplied building material to much of the county.

The Lyvet family were lords of the manor of several South Yorkshire villages, and Hooton Levitt (sometimes spelled Hooton Levett) was given the manorial affix of the Anglo-Norman family who eventually came to own it. William Levett married Constantia, granddaughter of Richard FitzTurgis, founder of Roche Abbey and first to style himself 'de Wickersley' after his holding of the nearby village of Wickersley.

Following the marriage of William Levett and Constantia de Wickersley, the Levett family controlled the Abbey through its patronage. In today's world such abbeys seem an odd concept, but during the Middle Ages they controlled huge swaths of land. Roche Abbey's holdings—and it was only of middling rank—were enormous, sprawling across five counties: Yorkshire, Nottinghamshire, Derbyshire, Lincolnshire and Lancashire.

Little is known of the life of William Levett, lord of the manor of Hooton Levitt and controller of Roche. He appears to have been a power in the region, having witnessed a charter in 1240 confirming a grant under William de Warenne, 5th Earl of Surrey, one of the most powerful Norman magnates, of land to the Kirklees nunnery. Levett (referred to as 'William de Livet') served as Steward to the Earl of Surrey. The Levett family's name is often connected with grants of land to the Abbey through the centuries. As lords of the manor of Hooton Levitt and principal patrons of Roche Abbey, the Levett family wielded considerable influence in the region.

But these were turbulent times, punctuated by the Black Death and the evolving feudal order, in which labor imbalances due to plague deaths gave the common laborer leverage against his lords. By the time of the tenure of Roche Abbey Abbot John de Aston (1356–1358) the Levett family seemed to have been stretched thin. In 1377 John Levett, son of William and likely grandson or great-grandson of the original William who gained control of the Abbey through marriage, sold control of Roche to a London merchant. The deed records Levett's words: "I, John Levet, son and heir of William Levet, of Hooton Levet, have given, granted, and by this present charter confirmed to Richard Barry, citizen and merchant of London, the whole of my estate, which I have or my ancestors have ever had in the foundation of the Abbey of Roche...."

At the height of the Abbey's power, during the tenure of the FitzTurgis family and their Levett descendants, Roche had some 80 monks within its walls. Quarrying its stone-rich meadows yielded large profits, as did income from its sprawling holdings, principally of grazing land but also within the city of York. The family's ties to this ecclesiastical bedrock during the turbulent Middle Ages likely provided some measure of spiritual comfort. All this passed out of the family's hands in 1377, perhaps because of financial mismanagement or the collapsing labor market due to the Black Death.

The family continued to remain in the area, moving on to nearby Normanton, where they were lords of the manor of the Newlands estate, and had longstanding ties to the Knights Hospitallers, and to High Melton, where many of the original charters of Roche, as well as the Chartulary of the St. John of Pontefract Abbey, eventually fell into the hands of Thomas Levett, a descendant who turned them over to eminent Yorkshire antiquarian Roger Dodsworth for study and publication. Most of the other records of Roche were lost when the chest in which they were kept in St Mary's Tower, York, was blasted by the Parliamentary forces of Oliver Cromwell during the siege of June 1644 in the English Civil War.

== Further viewing ==
- Simon Schama's A History of Britain, Simon Schama, BBC, 2002
