= Maltby, South Yorkshire =

Town and civil parish in South Yorkshire, England

Coordinates: 53.426°N 1.210°W

Maltby
- Village
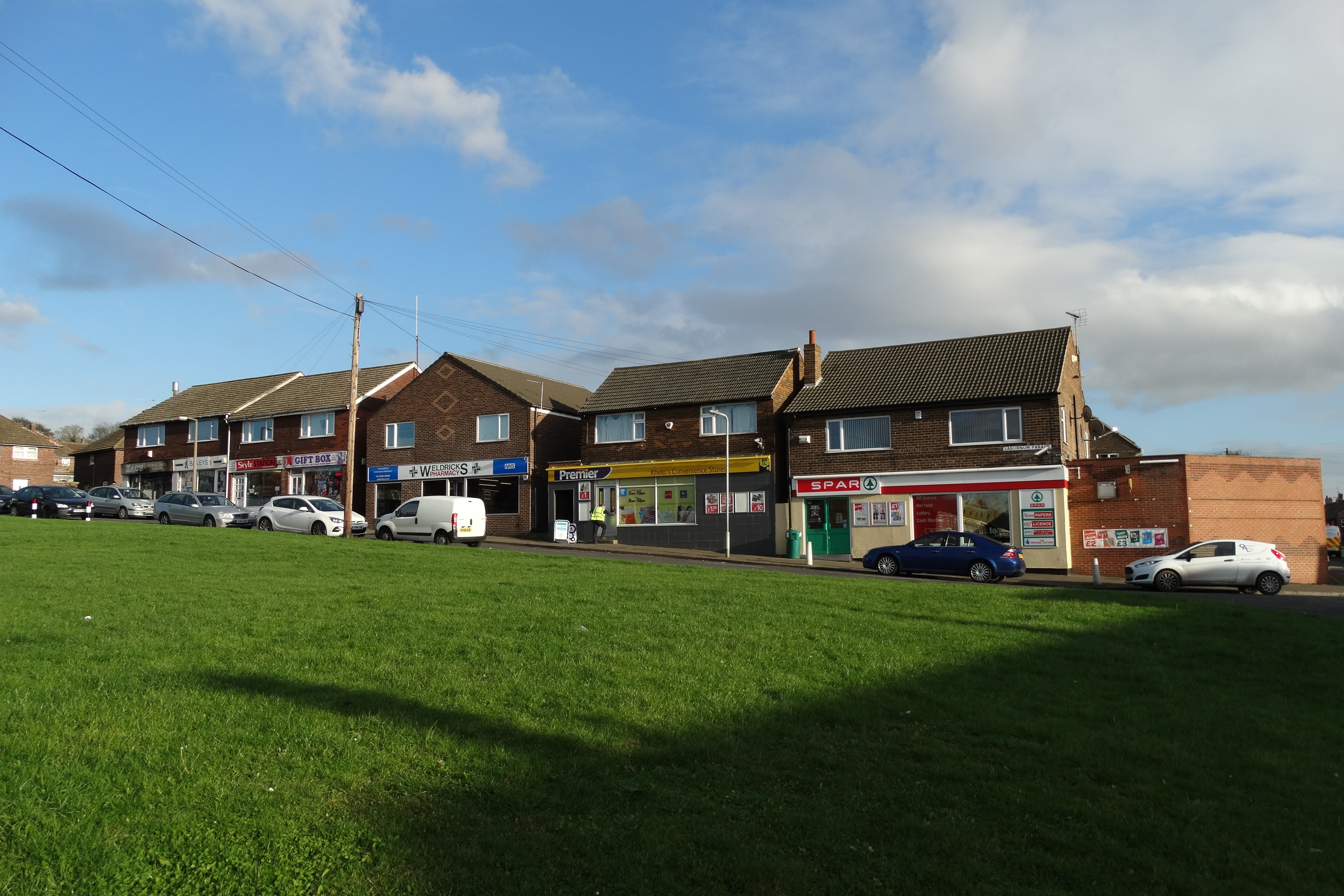
- Laburnum Parade

- Location within South Yorkshire
- Population: 16,688 (2011 census)
- OS grid reference: SK524924
  - London: 145 mi (233 km) south
- Civil parish: Maltby
- Metropolitan borough: Rotherham
- Metropolitan county: South Yorkshire
- Region: Yorkshire and the Humber
- Country: England
- Sovereign state: United Kingdom
- Post town: ROTHERHAM
- Postcode district: S66 7&8
- Dialling code: 01709
- Police: South Yorkshire
- Fire: South Yorkshire
- Ambulance: Yorkshire
- UK Parliament: Rother Valley

Maltby is a village and civil parish in the Metropolitan Borough of Rotherham, South Yorkshire, England. It was historically in the West Riding of Yorkshire. It is located 6 miles (10 km) east of Rotherham and 10 miles (16 km) north-east of Sheffield. It forms a continuous urban area with Hellaby, separated from the rest of Rotherham by the M18 motorway. It had a population of 16,688 at the 2011 Census.

== History ==
The place-name 'Maltby' is first attested in the Domesday Book of 1086, where it appears as Maltebi. The name means 'Malti's homestead or village'. Malti was a common Old Danish name.

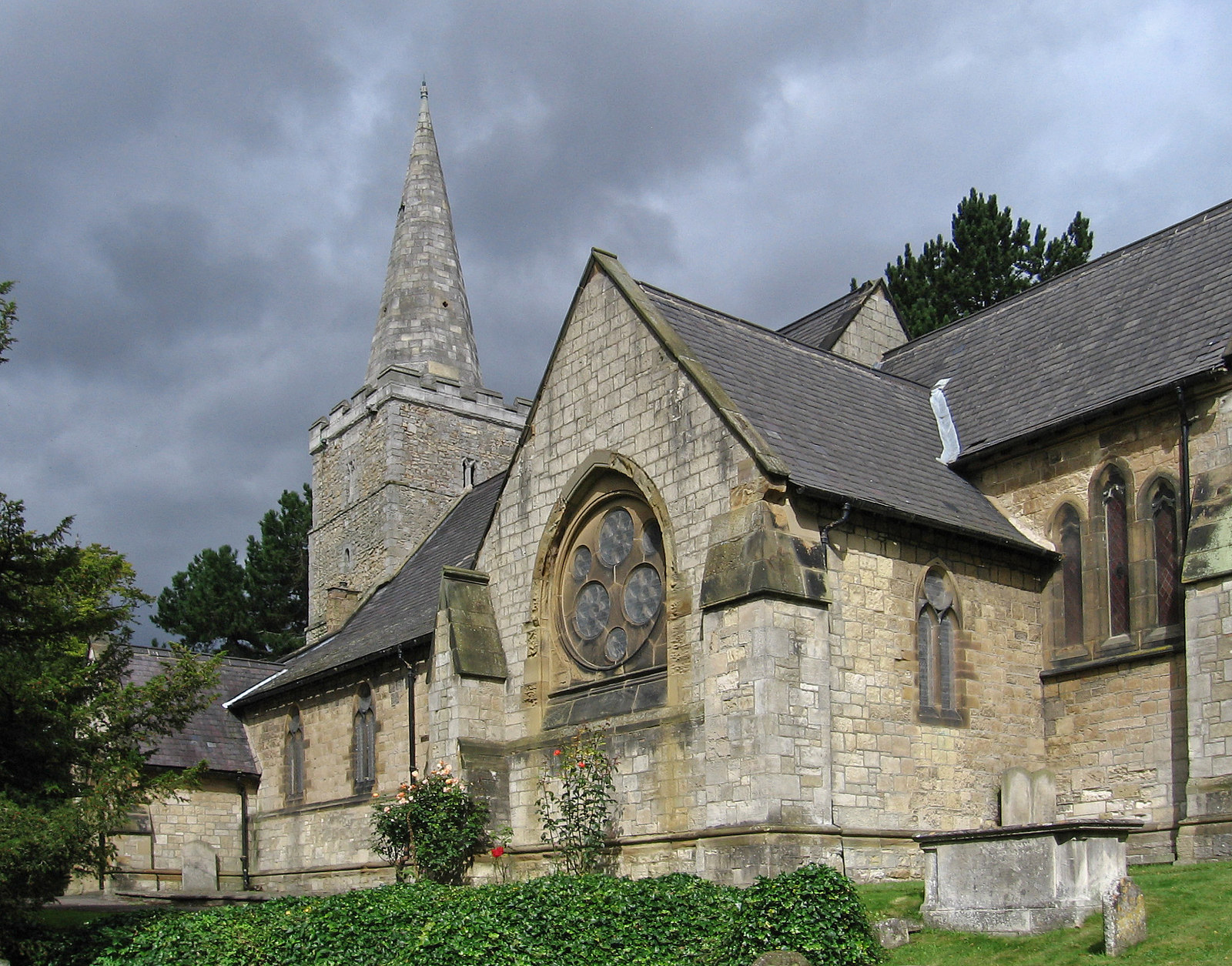
St Bartholomew’s Church

Maltby was for centuries a small village near a stream based around farming. Roche Abbey, on the outskirts of Maltby, was founded in 1147 by Cistercian Monks from Newminster Abbey (near Morpeth, Northumberland), and was suppressed during the Dissolution of the Monasteries in the reign of Henry VIII.

Coal was discovered in the area in the late 19th century; the last colliery in Rotherham was Maltby Main Colliery, established 1910 and faced with closure in March 2013. To house the colliery's workers, the colliery company built a large estate known as the 'Model Village' to the east of the town centre.

From 1900 until 1929, the village was served by Maltby railway station on the South Yorkshire Joint Railway, with services running between Doncaster and Worksop. The station's platforms still remain and the line is an important freight route. John Brown's Private Railway also ran by the west of Maltby, but the track has been lifted and is now a public footpath; a short stretch of track and a platform remains. During the Second World War, a munitions factory, ROF Maltby, was established on the outskirts of Maltby close to the colliery; an estate nicknamed 'Little London' was built to house its workers, who had moved from Enfield in London.

Maltby also had a knitwear factory, Byfords, which supplied various companies including Pringle – but this closed in 1999, and a police station was built on the site.

Maltby's main council housing stock went into serious disrepair during the 1980s with areas like "White City" and the "Tarran estate" (now demolished) worst affected. Maltby local government funding in 1997, council estates such as White City and Birk's Holt Drive have been redevelopment. Derelict land and a former club building was demolished and the land redeveloped during the 1990s by John & Jeanne Jebson and Richard & Jen Schofield who developed two private dwellings on Meadow Lane and developed individual building plots and named Foxcroft Meadows – an area of seven new builds. New council housing was opened in 2011 on the site of the former Tarran estate.

=== Peerage ===
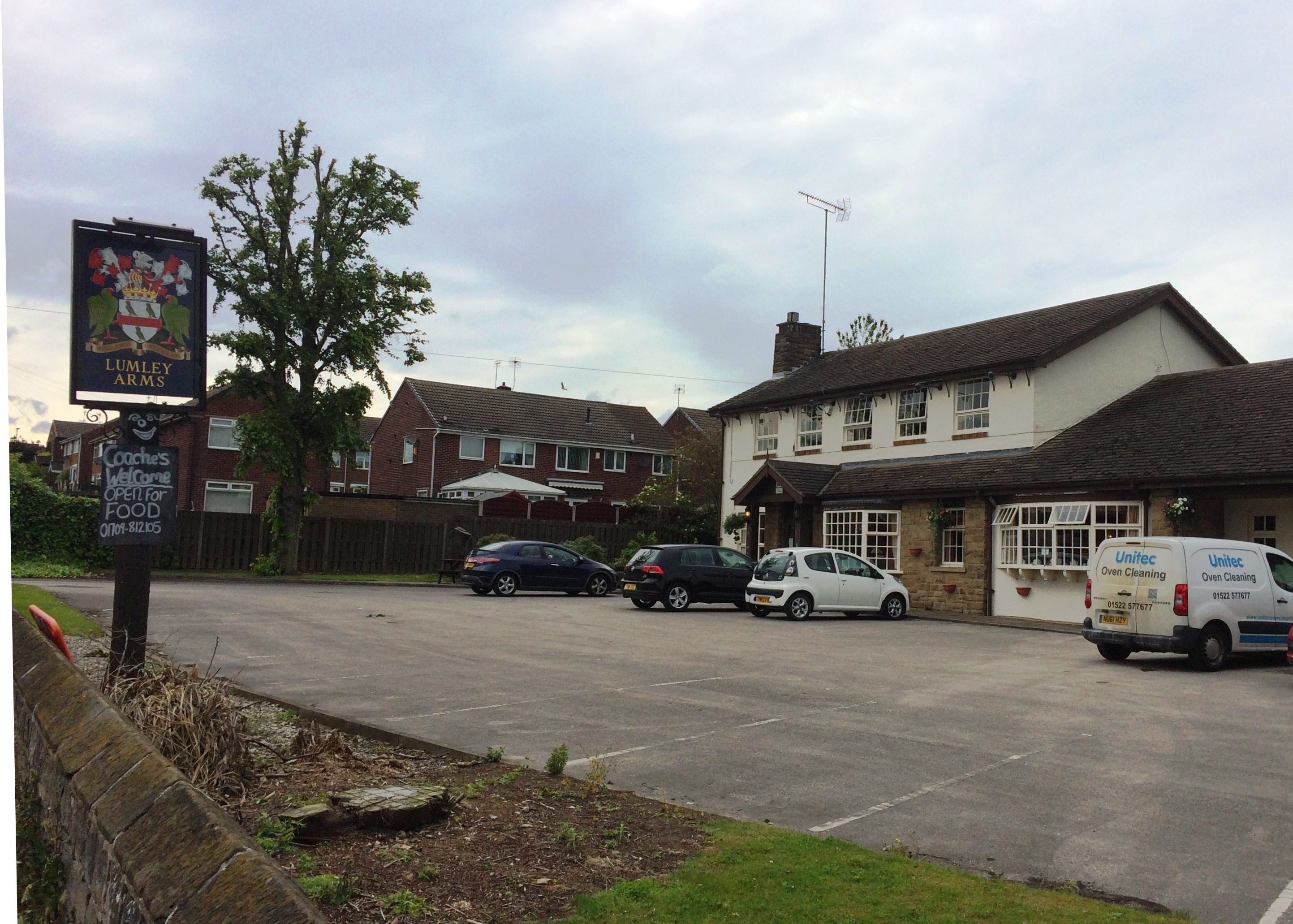
The Lumley Arms, a pub in Maltby, takes its arms from that of the Lumley family

Maltby has historically been connected with the peerage title of Earl of Scarbrough. Sandbeck Park in Maltby has been the family seat of the Earl of Scarbrough since 1752. The title of Earl of Scarbrough is synonymous with the Lumley family, who have held the title since its creation. The present holder of the title is Richard Lumley.

The Maltby coat of arms has three green parrots, taken from the arms of the Lumley family, as well as the Yorkshire rose.

=== Industrial Revolution ===
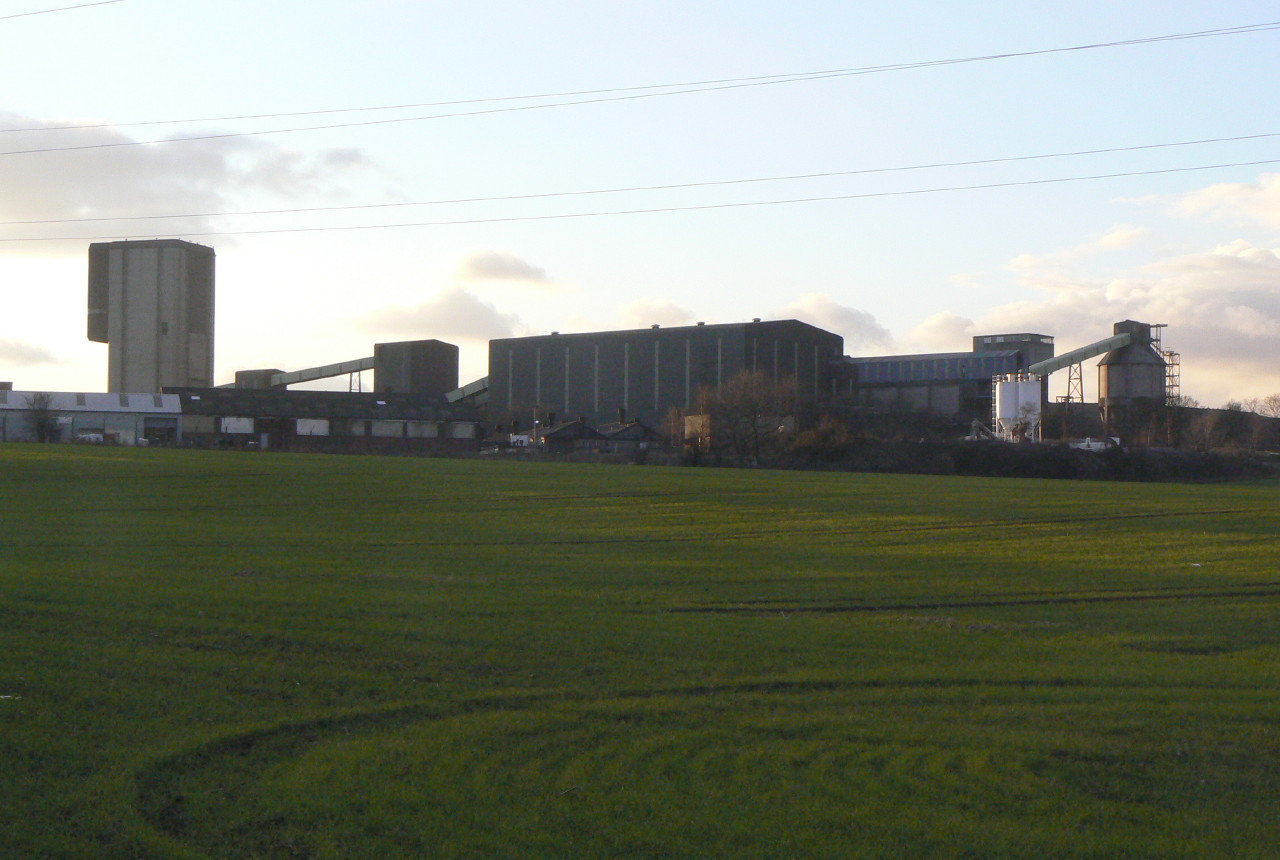
Maltby Colliery before being demolished

Sinking of the original shafts of Maltby Colliery began in 1907, as part of the development a large estate known as the "Model Village" was constructed as housing for the colliery workers.

An explosion in the colliery occurred in 1923, resulting in 27 deaths. Maltby Main pit was the site of mass picketing during the '80's miners' strike, which lasted almost exactly a year from March 1984 to March 1985, and the pit was the last to return to work when the strike ended. Post nationalisation the pit was sold to RJB Mining (later known as UK Coal) in 1994, and later to Hargreaves Services in 2007.

After encountering geological problems when trying to access a new coal seam, colliery owner Hargreaves announced that on health and safety grounds the mine would have to close. Maltby Colliery closed in March 2013, with a march held by former miners and residents of the town to mark the occasion.

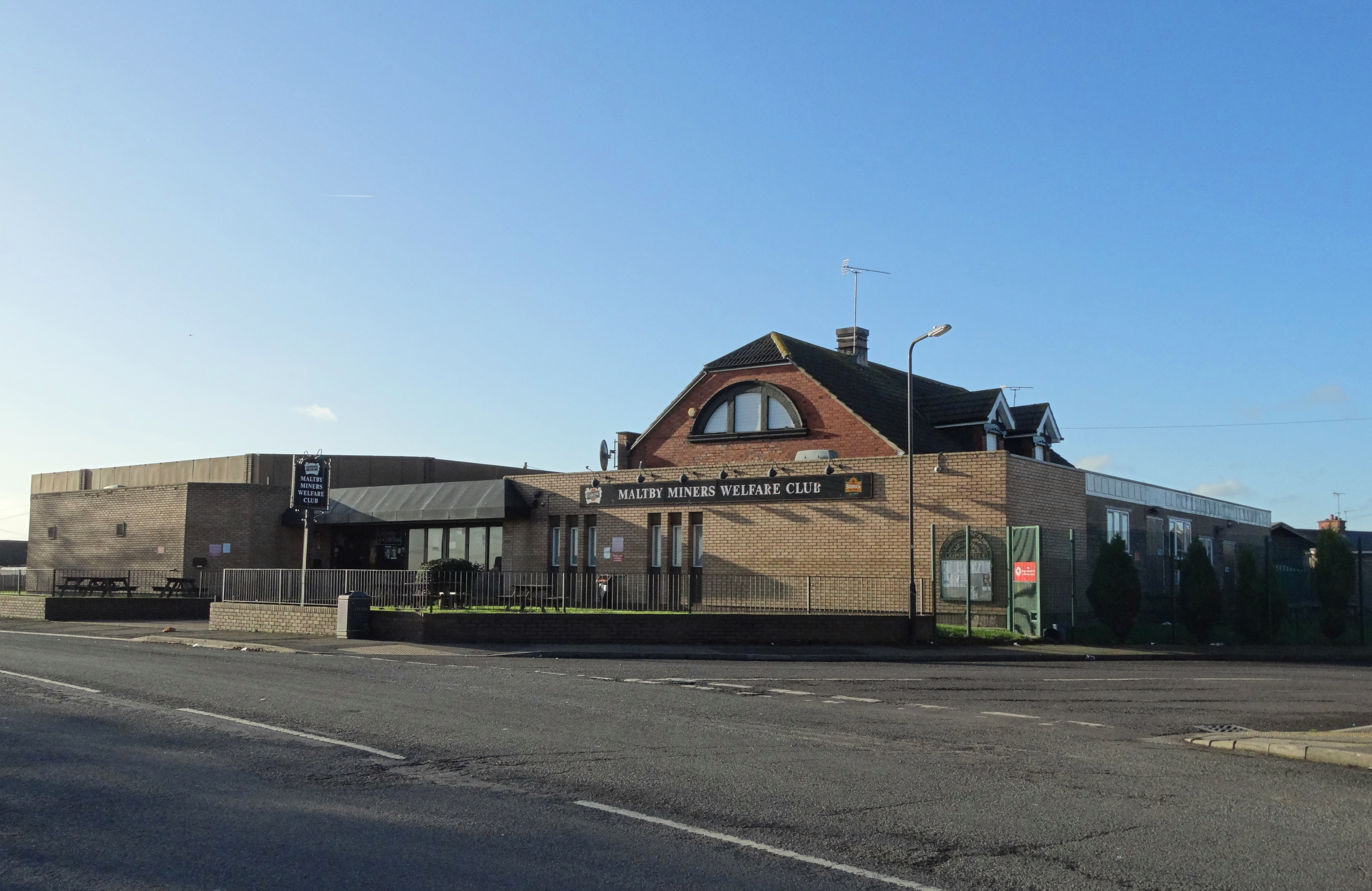
The “Stute” prior to its closure, December 2015

The Maltby Miners Welfare Club, a working men's club for miners, closed in 2018. The pub was locally known as the "Stute", after the Maltby Colliery Institute and Recreation Ground Scheme, the charity which has traditionally been responsible for the maintenance and upkeep of the pub's premises and the neighbouring sports field. There was a long-running campaign to reopen the Stute, until it was damaged by a large fire in April 2021, forcing the pub to close permanently.

== Politics ==
Until 1974, Maltby had an urban district council, and was part of the West Riding of Yorkshire. Following the Local Government Act 1972, Maltby is now governed by Rotherham Metropolitan Borough Council, part of the metropolitan county of South Yorkshire, and also has a parish council, Maltby Town Council. Maltby Town Council has a majority of independents but has Labour representatives for the Rotherham Borough Council. The political makeup of Maltby Town Council is below:

Party	Number of councillors
Independent	11
Conservatives	3
Labour	3
Reform UK	1

The town lies in the South Yorkshire constituency of Rother Valley, currently held by Labour MP Jake Richards.

Maltby also falls within the jurisdiction of the Metropolitan Borough of Rotherham, under the mayorship of Rukhsana Ismail, as well as the South Yorkshire Mayoral Combined Authority, under the mayorship of Oliver Coppard.

Kelseii Brown was the first Reform UK councillor to get elected on Maltby Town Council. He was elected unopposed.

Maltby has many distinct areas, including:

- Maltby town centre
- Model Village (south west of the town centre)
- Cliff Hills (to the west of the town centre)
- White City (to the southeast of the town centre)
- Little London (to the north of the town centre)
- Birks Holt estate
- New estate
- Highfield Park.

== Amenities ==
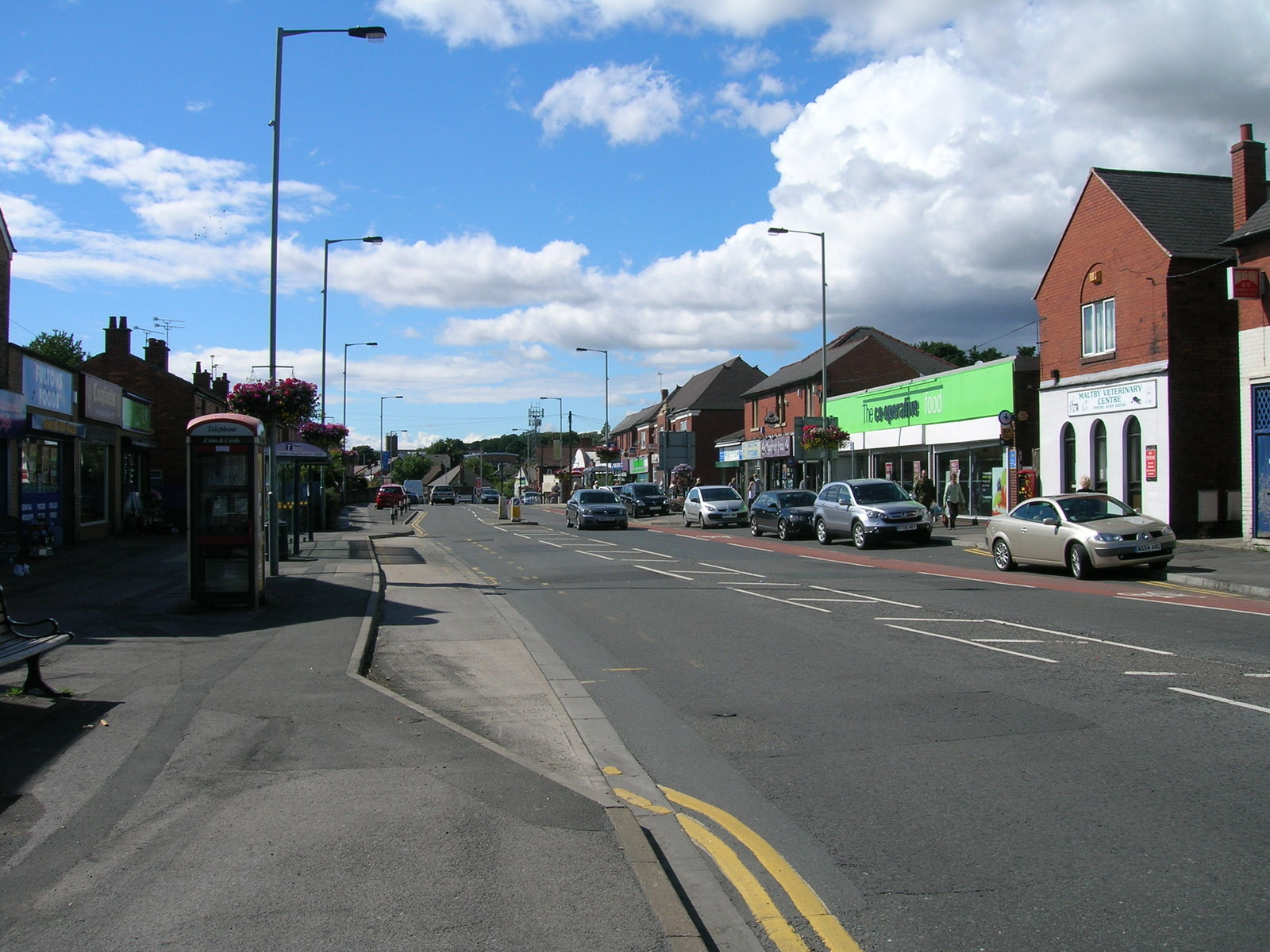
High Street

Before coal was discovered in the area, Maltby was a small agricultural village, centred on the Parish Church of St Bartholomew's (ref Domesday Book / Saxon Tower), with a population of around 500 at the start of the 1900s. With the opening of the mine in 1907 miners came from all parts of the UK – Wales, Staffordshire, Durham, Scotland and Ireland (the latter descendants of the canal (navvies) and railway building). The miner's Model Village was built with its centre piece as the Church of the Ascension, an annexe to the Parish Church, and in addition a significant presence of Methodist, Congregational, Salvation Army and Roman Catholic places of worship developed. The new community spawned several working men's clubs, including the 'Stute' (short for the Miner's Welfare Institute), the 'Slip', the ROF Club (Royal Ordnance Factory) and Catholic Club. The most significant sports clubs were the Miner's Institute ('Maltby Main' – football and cricket) and Roche Abbey Cricket Club, where Freddy Trueman commenced his illustrious career.

At its peak, Maltby had a population of 18,158 in 1991, but following deindustrialisation in the 1980s/90s, this figure has dropped by roughly 10%, standing at 16,688 in 2011.

The village is served by a variety of shops and businesses. There are multiple public houses in the village, the oldest of which is the White Swan which dates from the 16th century. In 2015, the White Swan closed, and the building became an Indian restaurant.

Despite the rebuilding/refurbishment of some housing stock at the beginning of the 21st century, the ward of Maltby, particularly the eastern area, (in 2010) included areas of high deprivation, according to data generated by the Department for Communities and Local Government.

== Education ==
Maltby Academy on Braithwell Road (B6376) is a secondary school which serves the village and some surrounding areas. It was previously known as Maltby Comprehensive School until receiving academy status in 2010. Permission was granted in 2012 to rebuild the school, to the opposition of some residents.

Initially however, the 'campus' comprised Maltby Grammar School and Maltby Hall Secondary Modern School built on the site of Rolleston Hall. The Grammar School was built in 1931 through the enterprise of County Alderman Dunn, a miner and Labour Councillor, and survived through to the 1970s, guided throughout by the Headmaster, Gerald Rush, pupils being drawn from the adjacent mining towns of Dinnington, Thurcroft, Edlington and Rossington, plus Wickersley, Bramley, Laughton, Tickhill, Bawtry and smaller villages of Braithwell, Micklebring, Anston, Austerfield and other smaller settlements. The Grammar School period architecture survives today with its imposing front and iconic clock set high above Rotherham Road.

The Grammar School building now serves the town as a 'Business Hub', housing various local businesses as well as the Sixth Form.

== Media ==
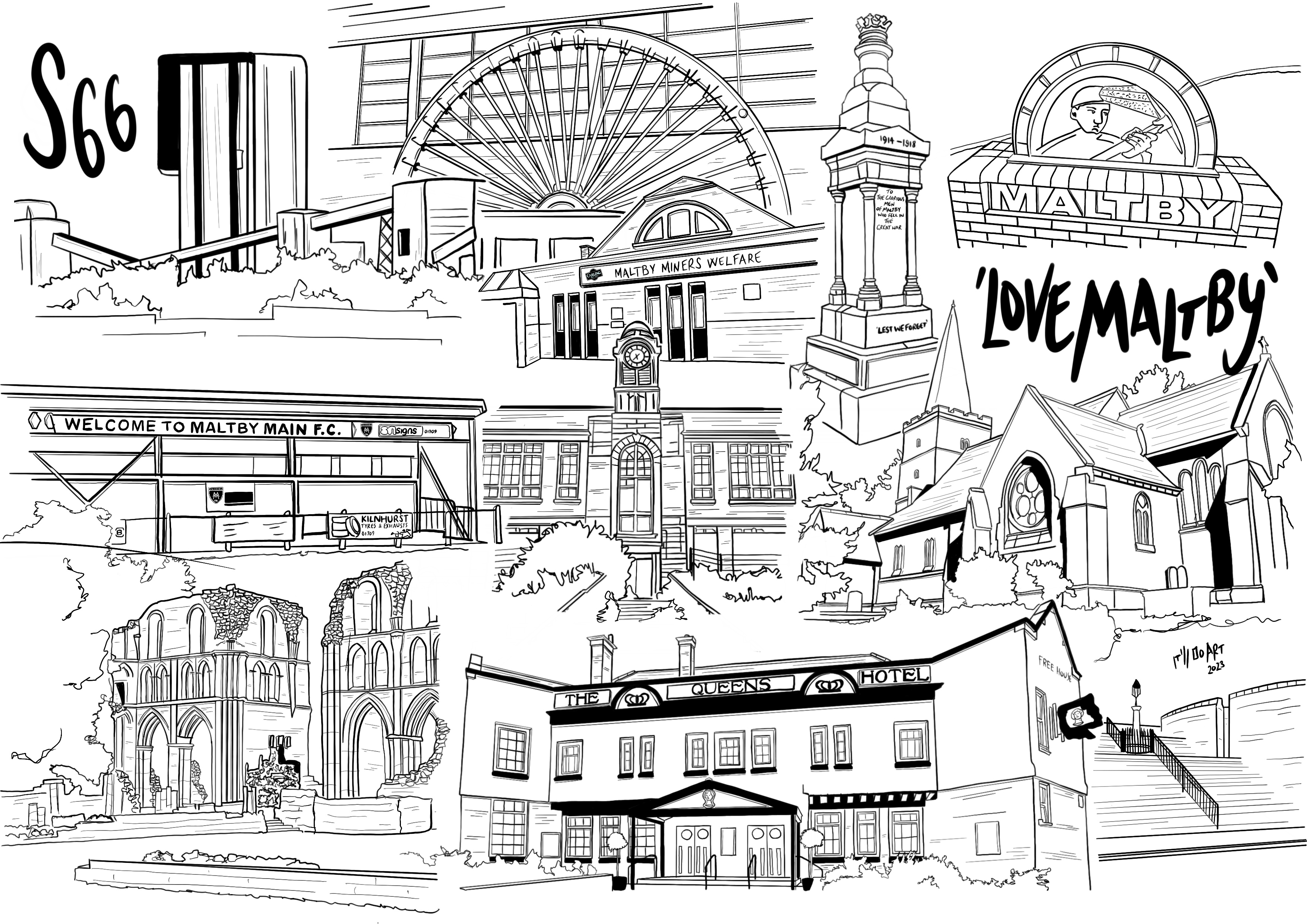
Maltby Art: a 2023 artwork showing features of the town

Local news and television programmes are provided by BBC Yorkshire and ITV Yorkshire. Television signals are received from the Emley Moor TV transmitter.

Local radio stations are BBC Radio Sheffield, Heart Yorkshire, Capital Yorkshire, Hits Radio South Yorkshire, Greatest Hits Radio Yorkshire, and Rotherham Radio, a community based station.

The Rotherham Advertiser is the village’s local newspaper.

== Sport ==
The ancient game of "beck ball" was revived in the mid-1980s to some success; this is a sort of rugby game, where opposing teams generally fight a turf war in the local stream, Maltby Dike – or Beck as locally known. This stream runs through the valley past St Bartholomew's, thence past Maltby Crags, through the Norwoods, through the centre of Roche Abbey, emptying into the River Ryton at Blyth a few miles downstream. Below Maltby, the stream has also been referred to as the 'Comwell'. Near to Roche Abbey is Sandbeck Hall, the home of the Earl of Scarborough.

Maltby's local football team is Maltby Main F.C., which was established in 1916 and plays at Muglet Lane. In 2024, the band Bring Me the Horizon, whose drummer Matt Nicholls is from Maltby, designed and sponsored a new kit for the team.

Maltby has a local sword dancing team (Maltby Sword Dancers, prev. Maltby Phoenix Sword) which dates back to the early 1900s. The team is mixed gender and age, the current iteration forming in 2005. The team were based in Maltby until 2024, when they relocated to The Red Hart in Blyth. The team dances both Rapper Sword Dancing and Longsword Dancing.

== Transport ==
The village is served by high frequency (every 15 mins during the day) buses: the X1 SteelLink service to Sheffield runs via Rotherham town centre and the Meadowhall Shopping Centre. In addition, there is also service X2, which runs through Maltby every 30 minutes in the daytime from Sheffield to Maltby via Flanderwell, Sunnyside, Bramley and also to Doncaster via Braithwell and Balby every hour; these are all run by First South Yorkshire. There is also the X11 service which runs to Sheffield via the parkway and takes a diversion to Rotherham Hospital and AMRC in Waverley which runs every hour to Sheffield and every 2 hours towards Doncaster via Tickhill. Maltby is also served by the X5 service every hour that provides a link to the nearby fellow former mining towns and villages of Thurcroft, Dinnington and Kiveton Park. This service terminates at Sheffield Interchange. The X7 service also runs at peak times towards Sheffield via the parkway.

Maltby is situated close to junction 1 of the M18 motorway, allowing quick access by car for commuters to Sheffield and Doncaster, and the A631 road runs through the village, linking it with the centre of Rotherham.

== Notable people ==
- Chuckle Brothers, entertainers
- Fred Trueman, cricketer, was educated at Maltby Hall School. He moved to Maltby from Stainton, and worked at Maltby Colliery, as did his father.
- Lynne Perrie, an actress who played the role of Ivy Brennan in Coronation Street for 23 years, lived in the Cliff Hills area until her death in March 2006.
- Duggie Brown, Lynne Perrie's brother, entertainer (ex Brookside) lived in the Maltby area before moving away during the 1970s.
- Bill Waddington, actor, played Percy Sugden in Coronation Street
- Fred Kitchen, author, wrote a number of biographical works on rural life and worked in and around the Maltby area. His best-known work is Brother to the Ox.
- George Rolleston, English physician and zoologist. He was the first Linacre Professor of Anatomy and Physiology to be appointed at the University of Oxford.
- Liam Kirk, English ice hockey player. He became the first player born and trained in England to be drafted into the NHL when he was selected by the Arizona Coyotes in the 7th round of the 2018 NHL entry draft.
- Matt Nicholls, drummer of the rock band Bring Me the Horizon, was born and raised in Maltby.
- Terry Sanderson, writer and gay rights activist, was born in Maltby in 1946.

== In popular culture ==
- Bramley, near Maltby, was the setting for the book Welcome to Everytown by philosopher Julian Baggini, who lived in the area for six months for the purpose.
- The town also featured as the central location in the 2018 film Pond Life.
- The book Haggis and Yorkshire Pudding tells the story of the diaspora of Scottish mining families who moved to Maltby in the 1950's and 1960's.
- The Maltfriscans, a movement of Catholic punk rock musicians, originated at St Mary Magdalene RC Church in Maltby in the 1970's.

== See also ==
- Listed buildings in Maltby, South Yorkshire
