= Roche Abbey =

Cistercian abbey in South Yorkshire, England

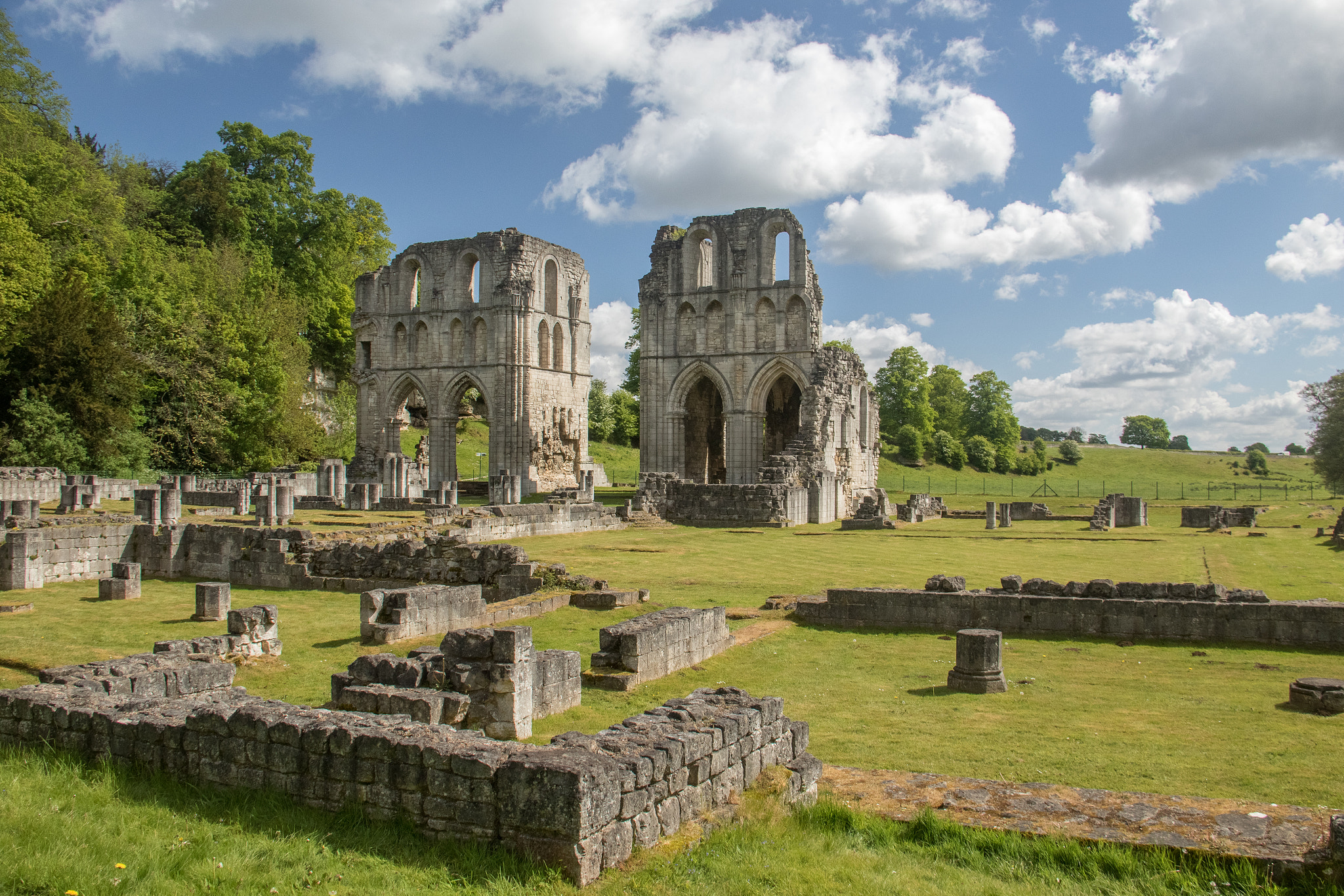

- Location within South Yorkshire
- 53°24′09″N 1°11′00″W
- Type: Abbey
- Location: Rotherham, South Yorkshire

Site notes
- Governing body: English Heritage
- Owner: Private

Scheduled monument
- Official name: Roche Abbey Cistercian monastery, including monastic precinct, gatehouse and 18th century landscape garden
- Designated: 8 February 1911
- Reference no.: 1019059

National Register of Historic Parks and Gardens
- Official name: Sandbeck Park and Roche Abbey
- Type: Grade II*
- Designated: 1 June 1984
- Reference no.: 1001161

Roche Abbey is a now-ruined abbey in the civil parish of Maltby, Rotherham, South Yorkshire, England. It is in the valley of Maltby Dyke, known locally as Maltby Beck, and is administered by English Heritage. It is a scheduled monument and Grade II* listed in the National Register of Historic Parks and Gardens.

== Early history ==
The abbey was founded in 1147 when the stone buildings were raised on the north side of the beck. The co-founders of Roche were Richard de Busli, likely the great-nephew of the first Roger de Busli, the Norman magnate builder of Tickhill Castle, and Richard FitzTurgis. According to the Monasticon Anglicanum, the two Richards gave land to the monks on each side of the stream on the understanding that abbey should be built on whichever side was considered most stable for building and that both of them would receive as much credit as the other, with the one whose land was rejected being held to the same level of thanks, regardless of whose side of the stream it was built on.

When the monks first arrived in South Yorkshire from Newminster Abbey in Northumberland, they chose the most suitable side of the stream that runs through the valley to build their new Cistercian monastery. Twenty-five years later, at the end of the century, the Norman Gothic great church, dedicated to the Virgin Mary, had been finished, as well as most of the other buildings. The control of the abbey was vested in the de Vesci family, lords of Rotherham, who in turn subfeuded the land to Richard FitzTurgis, lord of Wickersley (and who took Wickersley as his surname).

From the start, the Abbey of Roche, built for the so-called White Monks, as the Cistercians were known, had an almost otherworldly air. It was, after all, built at the northern end of an area once covered by Sherwood Forest, and it was said that Robin Hood went to Mass here. (A diocesan pilgrimage is still made today on Trinity Sunday.) At its height it supported a community of around 175 men, of whom about 60 were choir monks, the remainder being lay brothers, a Cistercian innovation.

Eventually, on the death of co-founder FitzTurgis, control of the abbey passed to his son Roger, now 'de Wickersley', and then eventually to a granddaughter Constantia, who married William de Livet (Levett), a family of Norman origin who were lords of the nearby village of Hooton Levitt (or Levett). The abbey continued in the Levett family until 1377, when John Levett sold his rights in the abbey to the London merchant Richard Barry. By the time of the dissolution full control of Roche Abbey was held by Henry Clifford, 2nd Earl of Cumberland, who came in for multiple grants at the Dissolution as he was married to the niece of King Henry VIII.

== Dissolution ==
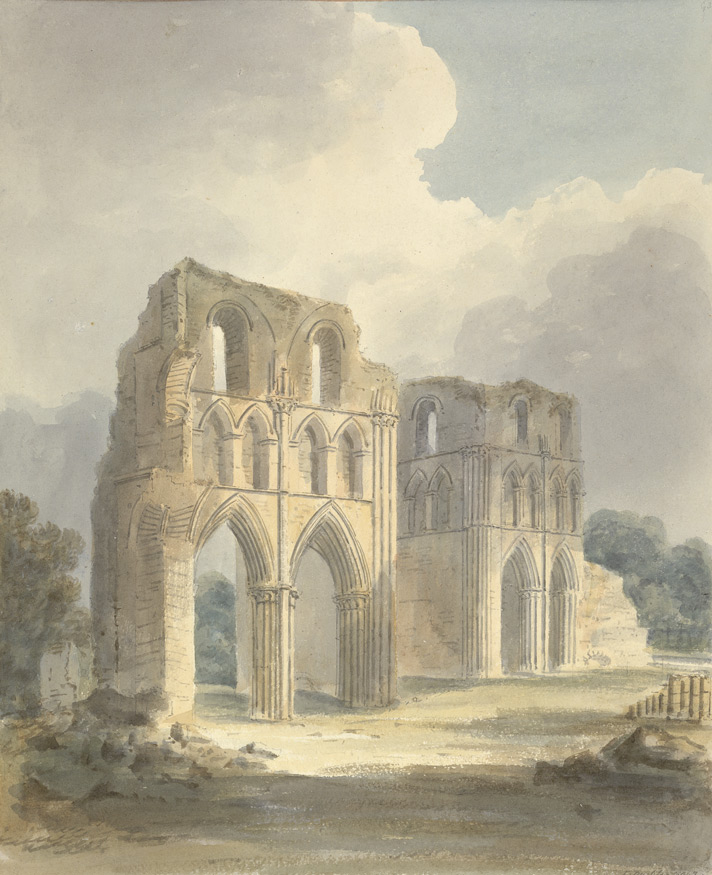
View of ruined transept of Roche Abbey by John Buckler, watercolour, 1810

The Roche Abbey records have been either lost or destroyed, so there are no accounts of the abbey's activities, other than that there were 14 monks and an unknown number of novices at the time of the dissolution by Henry VIII on 23 June 1538. It was this that led to the abbey being reduced to ruins, although the surviving parts of the walls of the north and south transepts are still impressive. The local community at time of the dissolution decided they had first right of claim on Roche Abbey and its possessions. Timber, lead and stone were also removed in vast quantities.

Between 1567–1591, Michael Sherbrook wrote an influential account of the Dissolution of the Monasteries, The Falle of Religiouse Howses, Colleges, Chantreys, Hospitalls, &c. Sherbrook was rector of nearby Wickersley while writing, and included a section on Roche Abbey. Sherbrook was a child at the time of the suppression and the account, "the most complete from any religious institution in England", was related to Sherbook by his uncle who had been present at the spoliation of the abbey.

For the church was the first thing that was spoiled; then the abbot's lodging, the dormitory and refectory, with the cloister and all the buildings around, within the abbey walls. For nothing was spared except the ox-houses and swinecoates and other such houses or offices that stood outside the walls – these had greater favour shown to them than the church itself. This was done on the instruction of [Thomas] Cromwell, as Fox reports in his Book of Acts and Monuments. It would have pitied any heart to see the tearing up of the lead, the plucking up of boards and throwing down of the rafters. And when the lead was torn off and cast down into the church and the tombs in the church were all broken (for in most abbeys various noblemen and women were buried, and in some kings, but their tombs were no more regarded than those of lesser persons, for to what end should they stand when the church over them was not spared for their cause) and all things of value were spoiled, plucked away or utterly defaced, those who cast the lead into fodders plucked up all the seats in the choir where the monks sat when they said service. These seats were like the seats in minsters; they were burned and the lead melted, although there was plenty of wood nearby, for the abbey stood among the woods and the rocks of stone. Pewter vessels were stolen away and hidden in the rocks, and it seemed that every person was intent upon filching and spoiling what he could. Even those who had been content to permit the monks' worship and do great reverence at their matins, masses and services two days previously were no less happy to pilfer, which is strange, that they could one day think it to be the house of God and the next the house of the Devil – or else they would not have been so ready to have spoiled it.

— Michael Sherbrook's Account of the Spoliation of Roche

Sherbook's account gives the impression of a frenzy with looting by locals, and that the spoliation at Roche Abbey happened in a short space of time. Reassessment of the source and comparison with the treatment of other religious houses suggests a more organised and structured approach, with lead from the roofs likely removed by Cromwell's men. A grant of 1546 mentions valuable materials, such as lead and glass, still on the site which the archaeologist Hugh Willmott suggests indicates that the process of spoliation took a longer time than implied by Sherbook.

Left in ruin, the land passed through a number of private hands until the 4th Earl of Scarbrough decided it needed revitalising to enhance his adjoining family seat at Sandbeck Park. Lord Scarborough enlisted the talents of Capability Brown. With an astonishing disregard for history, Brown demolished buildings, built large earth mounds and turfed the whole site. Until the end of the 19th century Roche Abbey remained buried beneath Brown's work and wooded parkland. Excavation in the 1920s revealed the medieval foundations, which are now laid out on the site.

== The abbey today ==
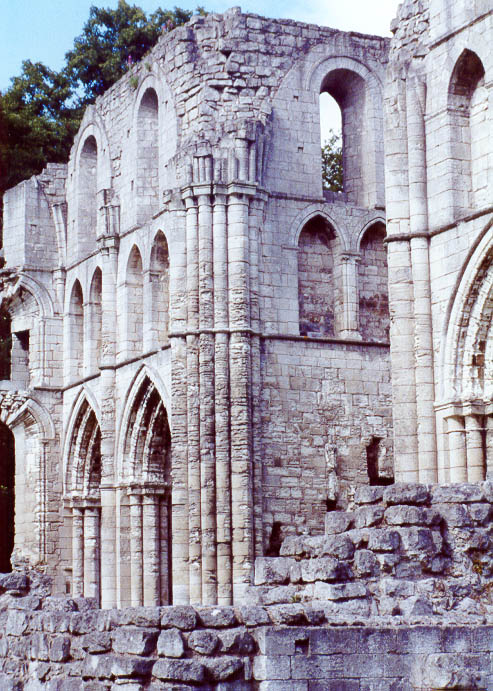
Roche Abbey

The site is now in the care of English Heritage. The cliff path walk provides access to a view across the abbey grounds where its layout can be appreciated. Some of the buildings are low-standing but the walls of the church still stand to full height and the gothic French idealism thrust into its design and architecture is visible. Later additions to the buildings included a kitchen area and abbot's quarters, built on the other side of the beck and accessed by a bridge which still stands. The monks' latrines were over Maltby Beck so the running water took away the waste. The stream was dammed higher up to ensure fast-flowing water: quite a modern facility for the 13th century. There are several local legends concerning ghosts, tunnels to other buildings, and even a lost wishing well.

== Burials at the abbey ==
The nave was the burial place for the lay brothers but others outside the immediate abbey community buried here include Peryn of Doncaster and his wife, Ysabel. There is also a tomb of the 14th-century Rilston family, presumably local worthies.
