= List of people from Sheffield =

This is a list of notable people who were born in or near, or have been residents of the English city of Sheffield.

== Arts and humanities ==
- Sidney Oldall Addy, folklorist and historian
- Charles Herbert Aslin, architect
- Samuel Bailey, philosopher and author
- William Sterndale Bennett, composer
- Ian Black, journalist and author.
- Clifford Edmund Bosworth, historian
- Fista, legendary graffiti and street artist.
- Malcolm Bradbury, author
- Michael Brennan, photographer
- A. S. Byatt, novelist
- Edward Carpenter, poet and activist
- Sir Francis Legatt Chantrey, sculptor
- Paul Conneally, poet, artist, musician
- Thomas Creswick, painter
- Thomas Wingate Todd, anthropologist, orthodontist
- Paul Bruce Dickinson, lead vocalist for the metal band Iron Maiden
- Margaret Drabble, novelist
- Ebenezer Elliott, poet
- William Empson, literary critic and Professor of English at the University of Sheffield
- William Flockton, architect
- Sarah Frankcom, artistic director of the Royal Exchange Theatre, Manchester
- Alfred Gatty, Church of England priest and author
- Robert Murray Gilchrist, novelist
- Dave Godin, writer and journalist, authority on black American soul music
- Mary Anne Everett Green, historian
- William John Hale, architect
- Joanne Harris, author (most famously of Chocolat)
- Ethel Haythornthwaite, environmental campaigner and pioneer
- Philip Hensher, author
- Barry Hines, author
- Barbara Hofland, children's writer
- John Holland, poet and journalist
- Linda Hoy, author
- Henry George Hoyland, painter
- Joseph Hunter, antiquarian and historian
- Mary Hutton, radical labouring-class poet
- Charles Sargeant Jagger, sculptor
- David Jennings, composer
- Alice Kipling, poet
- Robert Eadon Leader, journalist and historian
- W. C. Leng, journalist
- Marina Lewycka, author
- Arthur Lismer, artist
- Stephen Mallinder, musician, writer, broadcaster and academic
- Steve McCaffery, poet
- James Montgomery, editor and poet
- Alicia Moore, novelist
- Charles Mozley, artist
- Geoff Nicholson, author
- Bruce Oldfield, fashion designer
- John C. Parkin, architect
- Bernard Rands, composer
- Jack Rosenthal, playwright
- Stanley Royle, a post-impressionist landscape painter
- Margaret Ryder, artist
- Joe Scarborough, artist
- Si Spencer, TV dramatist and graphic novelist
- Kenneth Steel, artist
- Frederick Varley, artist
- White Watson, geologist, sculptor, stonemason and carver
- John Dodsley Webster, architect
- Glenn Gregory, musician, lead vocalist with Heaven 17
- Joe Elliott, musician, lead vocalist with Def Leppard
- Rick Savage, musician, bassist with Def Leppard
- Jarvis Cocker, musician, lead singer with Pulp
- Phil Oakey, musician, lead singer with The Human League

== Business ==
- Charles Boot, of Henry Boot & Co., developer of Pinewood Studios
- Carrie Rose, entrepreneur
- Sir John Brown, Mayor of Sheffield, founder of Atlas steel, inventor of the conical steel spring railway buffer and Inventor of rolled steel armour plating for ships.
- John George Graves, entrepreneur and philanthropist
- David James Richards, entrepreneur and multi-millionaire technologist
- Lee Strafford, technology entrepreneur and philanthropist`
- Peter Stringfellow, multi-millionaire businessman
- Joseph William Thornton, confectioner, founder of Thorntons
- Thomas William Ward, industrialist and shipbreaker
- Kevin McCabe (businessman), Businessman, property developer and former owner and chairman of Sheffield United F.C.

== Entertainment ==
- Owen Aaronovitch, actor
- Ray Ashcroft, actor
- Derek Bailey, musician, writer
- Nick Banks, musician, drummer for Pulp
- Jason Leaver, DJ, artist, broadcaster
- Matthew Bannister, BBC Radio 5 Live presenter
- Matthew Barley, cellist
- Vikram Barn, YouTuber, member and co-founder of the Sidemen
- Keith Barron, actor
- Josephine Barstow, opera singer
- Arthur Baynes, aka Stainless Stephen, music hall comedian
- Sean Bean, actor
- Dave Berry, musician
- J. Stuart Blackton, film producer
- Gavin Bryars, musician
- Alastair Burnet, news reader
- Marti Caine, comedian
- Tony Capstick, comedian, actor, musician and broadcaster
- Paul Carrack, musician, singer of Ace, Squeeze and Mike and the Mechanics
- Joanne Catherall, musician, singer in The Human League
- Steve Clark, musician, late Def Leppard guitarist
- Jessica-Jane Clement, actor, model
- Jarvis Cocker, musician, lead singer of Pulp
- Joe Cocker, singer
- Maurice Colbourne , actor
- Christopher Colquhoun, actor
- Jamie Cook, musician, guitarist for the Arctic Monkeys
- Henry Coward, choral conductor
- Richard Coyle, actor and comedian
- Thomas Craig, actor
- Stephen Daldry, film director
- Johnny Danvers, actor and comedian
- Bruce Dickinson, musician, lead singer of Iron Maiden
- Reginald Dixon, organist, pianist and radio presenter
- Candida Doyle, keyboard player with Pulp
- Steve Edwards, singer
- Joe Elliott, musician, lead singer of Def Leppard
- Graham Fellows, comedian, actor, known as "John Shuttleworth"
- Toby Foster, comedian, works for BBC Radio Sheffield; possibly from Barnsley
- Martin Fry, musician, lead singer of ABC
- Margaret Gale, opera singer
- Mark Gasser, pianist
- Liam Gerrard, actor
- Peter Glossop, opera singer
- Brian Glover, actor and wrestler
- Michael Grandage, theatre director
- Christopher Green, writer and performer
- Richard Hawley, musician, formerly of The Longpigs
- Paul Heaton, musician, formerly of The Beautiful South
- Matthew Helders, musician, drummer for the Arctic Monkeys
- Elizabeth Henstridge, actress
- Stephanie Hill, classical-crossover vocalist and Miss England 2017/18
- Emilia Holliday, actress
- Steven Houghton, actor and singer
- Charlotte Hudson, television presenter
- Robert Hudson, actor
- Jayne Irving, television presenter
- Stephen Jones, musician and novelist, formerly of Babybird
- Richard H. Kirk, musician
- Skelton Knaggs, actor
- Bobby Knutt, actor and comedian
- Ann Lee, singer, songwriter, dancer
- Tim Lever, music producer
- Susan Littler, actor
- James Lomas, Olivier Award-winning actor
- Steve Mackey, bass player with Pulp
- Emily Maitlis, television presenter
- Jonny Maudling, composer
- Patricia Maynard, actor
- Jon McClure, musician, frontman of Reverend and the Makers
- James McCourt, television presenter
- Richard McCourt, television presenter
- Patrick McGoohan, actor
- Philip Oakey, musician, lead singer of The Human League
- Nick O'Malley, musician, bassist in Arctic Monkeys
- Julian Ovenden, actor and singer
- Tony Oxley, musician
- Michael Palin, comedian, actor and travel presenter
- Judy Parfitt, actor
- Nick Park, animator and film director
- Mike Percy, music producer
- Angela Pleasence, actor
- Donald Pleasence, actor
- Martin Powell, former keyboardist of heavy metal band Cradle of Filth
- John Rawling, sport commentator
- Ian Reddington, actor
- Rony Robinson, broadcaster and writer
- Rick Savage, musician, bassist of Def Leppard
- Russell Senior, musician, former guitarist for Pulp
- David Slade, film director
- Susan Ann Sulley, musician, singer in The Human League
- Oliver Sykes, musician, lead singer of Bring Me the Horizon
- Alex Turner, musician, vocalist and songwriter for the Arctic Monkeys
- Anna Walker, television presenter
- Dan Walker, television presenter
- Martyn Ware, musician with Heaven 17
- Paul Joseph Watson, internet personality, editor of InfoWars
- Mark Webber, guitarist with Pulp
- Dominic West, actor
- Mark White, musician with ABC
- Willie Williams, set designer and video director
- Pete Willis, musician, former Def Leppard guitarist
- Tom Wrigglesworth, comedian
- Stuart Zender, bassist, songwriter and record producer
- Lee Malia, lead guitarist for Bring Me The Horizon
- Matt Kean, bassist for Bring Me The Horizon

== Politics ==
- Nick Ainger, politician
- Clive Betts, politician
- David Blunkett, former Cabinet minister (Education Secretary, Home Secretary, and Work and Pensions Secretary)
- William Broadhead, early trade unionist
- Richard Caborn, former Minister for Sport
- Brent Charlesworth, former Lord Mayor of Nottingham and also Sheriff of Nottingham
- Nick Clegg, Liberal Democrat leader 2007-2015 and deputy prime minister 2010–2015
- John Christopher Cutler, second governor of the State of Utah
- William Dronfield, early trade unionist
- George Hadfield, 19th-century politician
- Evan Harris, Liberal Democrat politician
- Enid Hattersley, Labour Party politician and Sheffield's Lord Mayor in 1981
- Roy Hattersley, politician and writer
- Samuel Holberry, Chartist
- Isaac Ironside, Chartist
- Helen Jackson
- Oona King, politician
- J. Batty Langley, politician and trade unionist
- Nicholas Liverpool, President of Dominica
- Frederick Mappin, cutler and politician
- Mary, Queen of Scots, held under house arrest in Sheffield for 14 years
- J. T. Murphy, leader of the Shops' Stewards Movement and the Communist Party of Great Britain
- Sally Oppenheim, Conservative MP and Minister
- John Parker, 19th-century politician
- Sir Irvine Patnick, politician and Conservative Party Whip under Margaret Thatcher and John Major
- Samuel Plimsoll, politician and advocate of the Plimsoll line
- Joseph Pointer, politician and trade unionist
- Mark Serwotka, trade unionist
- Derek Simpson, trade unionist
- Angela Smith
- Henry Stephenson, politician and businessman
- George Talbot, 6th Earl of Shrewsbury, Earl Marshal and gaoler of Mary, Queen of Scots
- Samuel Danks Waddy
- G. H. B. Ward, campaigner for access to moorland
- Cecil Henry Wilson, politician
- Hugo Young, journalist and political commentator
- Charles Frederick Crisp, 33rd Speaker of the United States House of Representatives

== Religion ==
- John Balguy, divine and philosopher
- Geoffrey Blythe, Bishop of Lichfield and Coventry 1503–c1530
- John Blythe, Bishop of Salisbury 1493–1500
- William Henry Brookfield, Anglican priest, Inspector of Schools, Chaplain-in-ordinary to Queen Victoria 1809–1874
- Alexander Kilham, founder of the Methodist New Connexion church
- James Moorhouse, Bishop of Manchester 1886–1903
- Robert Sanderson, Bishop of Lincoln 1660–1663

== Science and engineering ==
- Richard Bentall, clinical psychologist
- Henry Bessemer, engineer
- Thomas Boulsover, inventor of Sheffield Plate
- Harry Brearley, inventor of stainless steel
- Leonard Cockayne (1855–1934), botanist
- John Curr, coal mine and railway engineer
- Samuel Earnshaw (1805–1888), mathematician known for creating Earnshaw's theorem
- Charles Harding Firth, historian
- Mark Firth, steel manufacturer
- Sir John Fowler, railway engineer and co-designer of the Forth Railway Bridge
- Robert Hadfield, innovator of steel alloys
- Professor David Hughes (1941–2022), astronomer
- Benjamin Huntsman, inventor and steel manufacturer
- Amy Johnson (1903–1941), pioneering woman aviator
- Pieter Kok (born 1972), co-developer of quantum interferometric optical lithography
- Hans Adolf Krebs (1900–1981), biochemist, winner of the 1953 Nobel Prize in Physiology or Medicine
- Sir Harry Kroto (1939–2016), chemist, winner of the 1996 Nobel Prize in Chemistry
- Joseph Locke, railway engineer
- Peter Maitlis (1933–2022), organometallic chemist
- David Mellor, cutler
- Frederick Brian Pickering (1927–2017), metallurgist
- Juda Hirsch Quastel (1899–1987), biochemist
- Helen Sharman, astronaut (first Briton in space)
- Henry Clifton Sorby (1826–1908), microscopist and geologist
- Richard J. Roberts (born 1943), biochemist
- John Roebuck, inventor
- Grenville Turner (1936–2024), cosmochemist, noble gas geochemist
- John Paul Wild (1923–2008), astronomer

== Sport ==
- Micky Adams, footballer
- John Amaechi, NBA basketball player
- Gordon Banks, footballer
- Dominic Barrow, rugby player
- Dave Bassett, football manager
- Steven Bellamy, British karate team
- Danny Bergara, footballer and football manager
- Adam Blythe, cyclist
- Kell Brook, professional boxer
- Jon Brown, marathon runner
- Lee Chapman, footballer
- Steve Circuit, former professional footballer
- Charles Clegg, footballer and Chairman of the Football Association
- William Clegg, footballer and politician
- Sebastian Coe, track and field athlete
- Geoffrey Cornu, cricketer
- Tommy Crawshaw, footballer for England and Sheffield Wednesday
- Lucy Creamer, climber
- Phil Davis, professional footballer
- Louis Dodds, football player
- Derek Dooley, footballer
- Jeff Eckhardt, football player
- Malcolm Elliott, professional cyclist
- Jessica Ennis, track and field athlete
- Catherine Faux, triathlete
- Hazel Findlay, rock climber
- Matt Fitzpatrick, golfer
- David Ford, footballer, scored in 1966 F.A. Cup Final
- William Foulke, aka "Fatty" Foulks; goalkeeper
- Trevor Francis, footballer and football manager
- David Fraser-Darling, cricketer
- Redfern Froggatt, footballer
- Paul Goodison, sailor
- Herol 'Bomber' Graham, boxer
- Andrew Griffiths, field hockey forward
- Keith Hackett, football referee
- Naseem Hamed, boxer
- Ernest Harper, Olympic athlete
- Cuth Harrison, racing driver
- Donna Hartley, Olympic sprinter and Commonwealth gold medalist
- David Hirst, footballer
- Emlyn Hughes, footballer and football manager
- Ritchie Humphreys, footballer, EX PFA Chairman
- Brendan Ingle, boxing trainer
- Adam Johnson, cricketer
- Paul Jones, boxer
- Nick Matthew, squash player
- Reg Matthewson, footballer
- Harry Maguire, footballer
- Devon Malcolm, cricketer
- Ray McHale, footballer
- Don Megson, footballer
- Gary Megson, footballer and football manager
- Ben Moon, rock climber
- Esme Morgan, footballer
- John Motson, football commentator
- Kyle Naughton, footballer
- Johnny Nelson, boxer
- Jon Newsome, footballer
- Carlton Palmer, footballer
- Walt Palmer, footballer
- Tony Parkes, assistant football manager
- Steve Peat, professional cyclist; three-time UCI downhill world cup overall series champion
- Albert Quixall, footballer
- Jamie Reeves, winner of World's Strongest Man
- Uriah Rennie, football referee
- Ellie Roebuck, football goalkeeper
- Ryan Rhodes, boxer
- Dave Richards, Chairman of FA Premier League and former chairman of Sheffield Wednesday
- Mark Roe, professional golfer, coach and commentator
- Joe Root, England and Yorkshire cricketer
- Alan Rouse, mountaineer
- Jackie Sewell, footballer
- Billy Sharp, footballer
- Roberta Sheffield, Para-equestrian
- David Sherwood, tennis player
- John Sherwood, international 400 metre hurdler
- Sheila Sherwood, international long jumper 1962–1974
- Ron Shudra, former NHL player
- Joe Simpson, mountaineer
- Jim Smith, footballer and football manager
- Timothy Smith, cricketer
- Ron Springett, football goalkeeper
- Mel Sterland, footballer
- Roger Taylor, tennis player, Wimbledon semi-finalist 1973
- Tommy Thorpe, footballer and cricketer
- Geoff Thompson, chairman of the Football Association
- Will Thursfield, footballer
- George Ulyett, test cricketer
- Jamie Vardy, footballer
- Michael Vaughan, captain of England cricket team (2003–2008)
- Chris Waddle, England footballer
- Edward Wainwright, test cricketer
- Kyle Walker, footballer, England right-back
- Neil Warnock, footballer and football manager
- Nicky Weaver, goalkeeper
- Chris Wilder, football manager and former player
- Howard Wilkinson, football manager
- Danny Willett, professional golfer
- Justin Wilson, motor-racing driver
- Stefan Wilson, motor-racing driver
- Dennis Woodhead, footballer 1947–1959
- Chris Woods, football goalkeeper
- Clinton Woods, boxer
- Nigel Worthington, footballer and football manager
- Harry Wragg, jockey and trainer
- Harry Wright, major league baseball player

== Others ==
- Major William Barnsley Allen recipient of the Victoria Cross during World War I; born in Sheffield
- Felicia Dorothea Kate Dover, notorious poisoner.
- Arnold Loosemore, World War I soldier awarded the Victoria Cross
- Charles Peace, notorious murderer
