= Walter Palmer =

Walter Palmer may refer to:

- Walter Palmer (activist) (born 1934), American civil rights activist and educator
- Walter Palmer (basketball) (born 1968), American former basketball player
- Walter Palmer (Puritan) (1585–1661), early Separatist Puritan settler in the Massachusetts Bay Colony
- Walter Launt Palmer (1854–1932), American Impressionist painter
- Walter D. Palmer (1850–1894), American politician from New York
- Sir Walter Palmer, 1st Baronet (1858–1910), British biscuit manufacturer and Conservative politician
- Walter Palmer (born 1960), American big-game hunter and dentist notable for the killing of Cecil the lion
- Walter Palmer (rugby league) (1892–1973), Australian rugby league player
- Walt Palmer (1907–1985), English footballer

== See also ==
- Walter Palmore (born 1996), American professional football player
