= Nick Bax =

British designer (born 1970)

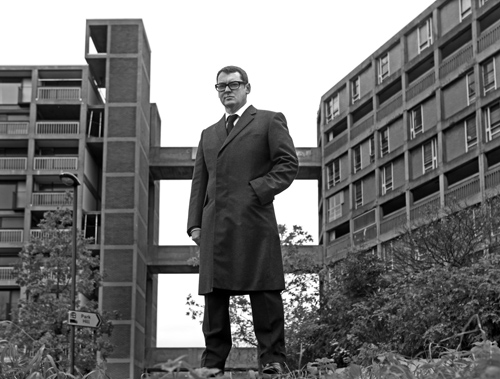
Nick Bax at Park Hill, Sheffield

Nick Bax (born 1970) is a British designer and academic whose creative practice has spanned the fields of graphic design, creative direction and art.

Bax was part of the world-renowned Designers Republic team for 15 years before launching the creative studio Human in 2007. Bax is also co-founder of the Computer Club music label.

Bax has a doctorate from the University of Sheffield for his PhD research exploring mixed reality storytelling, nonlinear narratives and the recreation of individuals, locations and memory via immersive technology.

Nick is a Fellow of the Royal Society of Arts (FRSA) and the Higher Education Academy (FHEA) and a visiting lecturer in visual communication and the creative industries. He serves on the Partnership Advisory Board for WRoCAH (White Rose College of Arts & Humanities), is a trustee of the mental health charity Sheffield Flourish, a member of Sheffield Theatres Trust Fundraising Committee and an ambassador for Eureka! (museum).

== Early life ==
Nick Bax was born in Huddersfield, England in 1970. He attended Maltby Comprehensive School from 1981 to 1986, studied art and design at Rotherham College of Arts & Technology from 1986 to 1988 and graphic design at North Essex School of Art (Colchester Institute) from 1988 to 1990.

== The Designers Republic (1990–92) ==
In 1990 Bax became a member of The Designers Republic (TDR) and helped to establish it as one of the most influential graphic design companies in the world. Activity during this time was primarily for the music industry, including record covers for Pop Will Eat Itself, The Orb and Warp Records.

== Mainartery (1992–93) ==
In February 1992 Bax was recruited by Mainartery, London, where he worked for 18 months, designing for artists signed to Sony, EMI, Phonogram and Simon Cowell (Arista).

== The Designers Republic (1993–2007) ==
Bax returned to TDR in July 1993, designing covers for key British artists such as Aphex Twin, Pulp and Supergrass. He also produced artwork for record labels including Warp Records and React, and the groundbreaking video games Wipeout and Grand Theft Auto. Other projects included packaging for Sony Aibo, rebrand of Nickelodeon, design of a TDR Swatch, MTV Qoob project, a visual identity for The University of Sheffield and an invitation to design the flag of Slovenia.

During this time, Bax exhibited with TDR at various galleries and locations around the world including the Barbican Centre (London), Museum of Contemporary Art (Barcelona), Passage de Retz (Paris), Electraglide Festival (Tokyo), and Artists Space (New York). He also contributed to the TDR issue of Emigre magazine (#29, 1994), which is now part of the permanent design collection in the Museum of Modern Art (MoMA), New York and items held in the Prints, Drawings & Paintings Collection at the V&A Museum, London.

== Human Studio (2007–present) ==
In 2007 Bax founded Human, a multi-disciplinary design studio.

Human have worked with various music artists including Dubfire, Richie Hawtin, Deep Dish, Application, Supergrass and The Black Dog (band).

The team have completed commercial design projects for organisations such as MTV, Roewe (China), Swatch, Kilgour, TIGI, University of Sheffield, Seaborn (USA), Channel 4 and Urban Splash.

Human have produced artwork for numerous music labels including SCI+TEC, CPU Records, BMG, Shabby Doll Records, mau5trap, Virgin EMI, Deep Dish Records, Dust Science, Soma, Computer Club, Parlophone, Warner Music and K7 Music (Germany).

Work by Human Studio has featured in various international publications including Eye Magazine, Design Week and The Guardian. The team have exhibited work extensively at galleries and events across Europe, Brazil, China, Japan, Canada and the United States.

Human created visuals for 'Sounds of the Cosmos' which was performed at The Octagon Centre (Sept 2014), The Crucible Theatre (June 2015) and Latitude Festival 2015.

The exhibition 'SHEFFIELD>>>TOKYO + <3' took place at the Calm&Punk Gallery, Tokyo, Japan, in October 2015. The show featured a combination of 3D printing and animation created by the Human team.

In 2016 Bax was one of 50+ artists commissioned to create an elephant for the Herd of Sheffield citywide art event. His design 'LIZZIETRON 2.2' was displayed outside the University of Sheffield Diamond building (Faculty of Engineering) from July–September and the Meadowhall Centre, 14–16 October 2016. The piece was auctioned at the Crucible Theatre on 20 October 2016, raising £5,900 for Sheffield Children's Hospital.

'The Art of SCI+TEC', an exhibition of Human's designs for the SCI+TEC music label was shown in Barcelona during June 2017 (BudLab), 2012 (Blow Gallery) and 2011 (Corretger5 Gallery).

In September 2020, Bax exhibited an immersive experience 'Schema' at the Millennium Gallery, Sheffield.

From 2021-23 Bax was an XR Stories research fellow at the University of York.

Bax directed a VR experience based on his short story ‘The Neon Pack’ which was exhibited at BEYOND (Cardiff City Hall), October 2022, the Immersive Futures Lab at SXSW (Austin, Texas), March 2023 and Sonar+D (Barcelona), June 2023.

In 2025, Bax was Creative Director and Producer for ‘Coded Black’, an artwork in the form of a video game. The interactive experience was officially selected for numerous international festivals including IDFA (Amsterdam), CPH:DOX (Copenhagen), Aesthetica (York), FIVARS (Toronto), WSXA (Paris), Animaze (Montreal), Harlem IFF, Planet (Barcelona) and Kiez (Berlin). It received a Special Mention from the IDFA DocLab awards jury for Digital Storytelling.
