= Crookes Cemetery =

Cemetery in South Yorkshire, England

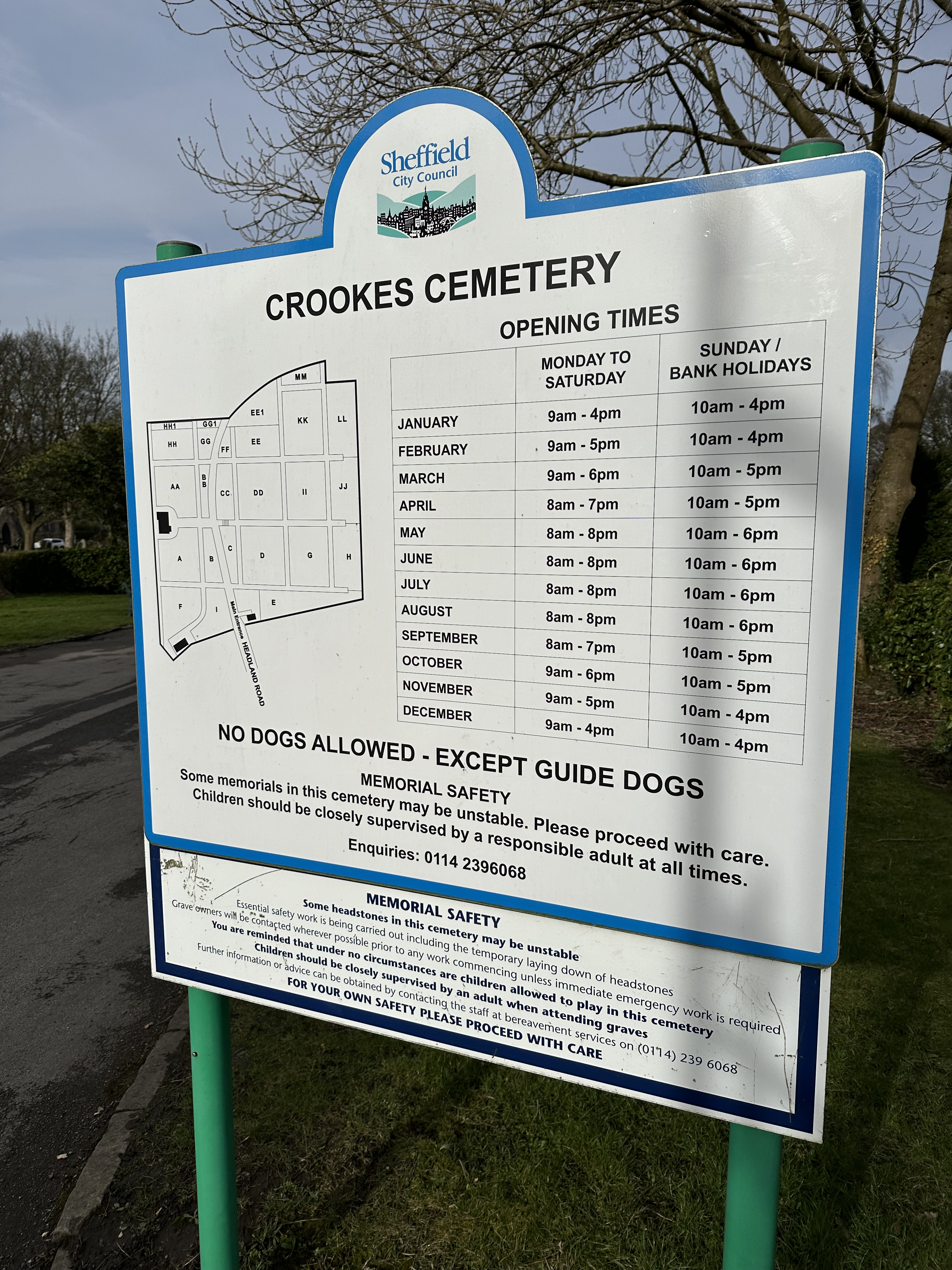
- Information board showing map of Crookes Cemetery and opening times
- Interactive map of Crookes Cemetery

Details
- Established: 1906
- Location: Headland Road, Crookes, Sheffield, South Yorkshire
- Country: United Kingdom
- Coordinates: 53.382700°N 1.517100°W
- Type: Anglican cemetery
- Style: Edwardian
- Owned by: Sheffield City Council
- Size: 29 acres
- No. of graves: 29,000+
- Website: Sheffield City Council
- Find a Grave: Crookes Cemetery

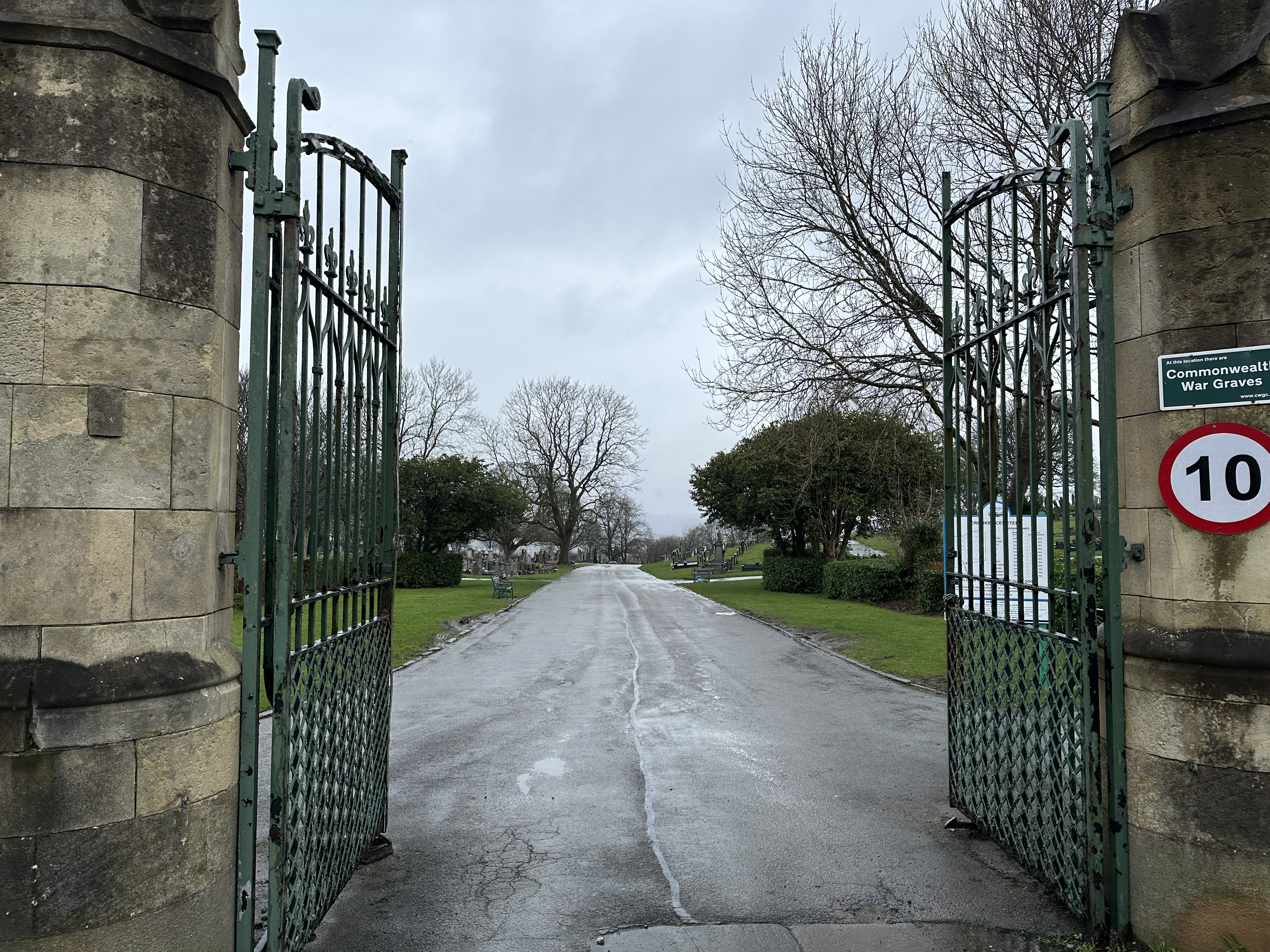
Gates and main entrance to Crookes Cemetery with Commonwealth War Graves signage

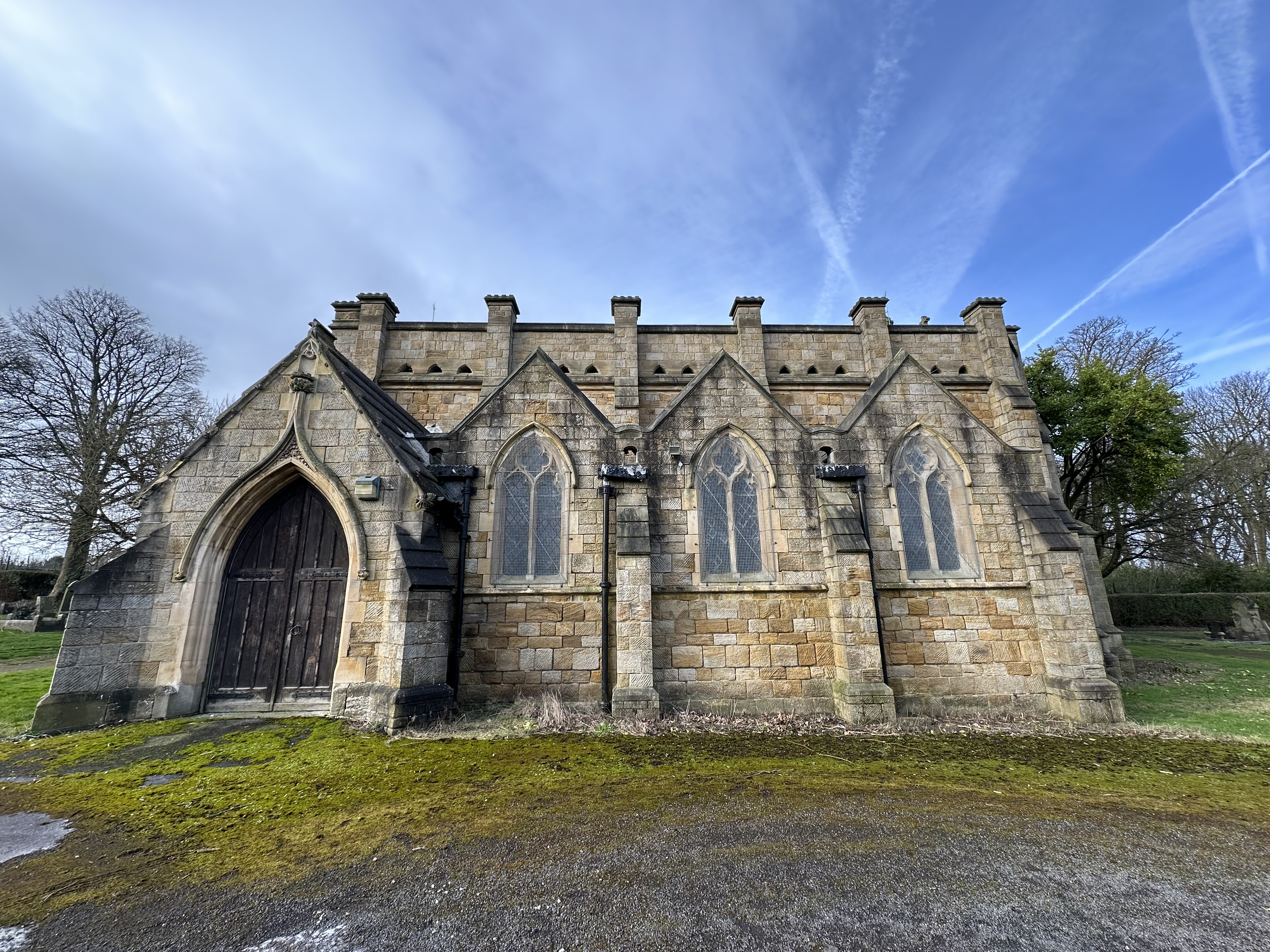
The Grade II listed chapel located westerly within Crookes Cemetery.

Crookes Cemetery is a cemetery between Crosspool and Crookes in the city of Sheffield, South Yorkshire, England. Its main entrance is on Headland Road with additional access from Mulehouse Road. It was opened in 1906, and covers 29 acres (120,000 m^{2}). By 2009, over 29,000 burials had taken place since its opening.

A central alley runs through the cemetery and separates the consecrated grounds to the north and the unconsecrated grounds to the south.

It is one of 16 cemeteries across the city that is maintained by Sheffield City Council.

== History ==
The land was originally owned by Councillor John Maxfield. Sheffield Corporation paid a total of £8,050 (£350 per acre for over 23 acres in extent) for the land which covers the cemetery itself as well as multiple surrounding allotments.

Maxfield was the first interment at the site for at least two full years before the cemetery was opened for burials, his epitaph was recorded as such. He was given special dispensation by the Corporation to be buried there.

== Cemetery chapel ==
The foundation stone for the chapel was laid by the Lord Mayor of Sheffield, Harry P. Marsh, on Friday 18 September 1908 at 12.30 pm. He was then presented with a silver trowel by the architects Messrs C. and C.M. Hadfield. The building is constructed from locally quarried stone from the Rivelin Valley, while the dressings around the windows, the tracery and doorways are in Bath stone from the Monk's Park quarry in Corsham, Wiltshire. The roof is covered with heavy slates from the Buttermere Green Slate Company in Cumbria while the mortuary aisle is roofed with arched ribs and slabs from Stuart's Granolithic Stone Co. Ltd. in Edinburgh. The chapel ceiling is groin vaulted while the floor is of terrazzo and wood. Messrs Hadfield's design was carried out by the building contractors D. O'Neill and Son, with C. Heywood as clerk of works. The chapel was Grade II listed in 1995.

== Totley Tunnel Memorial ==
In 1998, a monument was placed at Crookes Cemetery to commemorate the Irish Navvies who lost their lives whilst working on the Totley Tunnel. Scores died between 1888 and 1894 due to smallpox and cholera (as a result of poor living conditions) as well as a number of workplace accidents including in particular collapsed tunnels.

It is located near the main entrance on Headland Road, on the left opposite the south facing wall. The plaque reads:

"To Commemorate The Unknown Irish Navvies Who Died Building The Totley Tunnel Circa 1880 R.I.P."

It was placed in Crookes as opposed to Dore Churchyard as it was close to the traditional centre of the Sheffield Irish Community based in the St. Vincent Quarter.

== War graves ==
Seventy of the older graves, registered and maintained by the Commonwealth War Graves Commission, are those of armed services personnel who died serving in and during the First World War and the Second World War.

== Notable interments ==
- Henry Boot (1851–1931), founder of Henry Boot plc, a construction company
- Sir Stuart Goodwin (1886–1969), industrialist and philanthropist
- Ethel Haythornthwaite (1894–1986), English environmental campaigner and pioneer of the countryside movement
- Lieutenant-Colonel Gerald Haythornthwaite (1912–1995), English environmental campaigner and pioneer of the countryside movement
- John Maxfield (1831–1906), councillor, original owner of the land and first burial
- Tommy Ward (1853–1926), Master Cutler and founder of Thos. W. Ward, a shipbreaking company

== Filming location ==
A number of television shows and films have been filmed within the cemetery itself including most notably The Full Monty film starring Robert Carlyle in 1997 which lead to a boost in tourism due to its global appeal. Other films include X+Y starring Asa Butterfield in 2014.
