= Boot house =

Type of houses in the UK

Boot houses were houses built in the United Kingdom after World War I to accommodate the housing boom following the war. They were named after Henry Boot, whose construction company (Henry Boot Limited), produced an estimated 50,000 houses between the end of World War I and the start of World War II. Due to a shortage of bricks, boot houses were built using precast reinforced clinker-concrete columns. Structural tests in the 1980s revealed significant deterioration in the concrete as a result of carbonatation. The Housing Act 1985 provided government grants for homeowners of such "defective" houses.

== See also ==
- Housing, Town Planning, &c. Act 1919
- Pre-fab and no-fines house - solutions to the housing crisis following World War II
- Public housing
