= Ethel Haythornthwaite =

English environmental campaigner

Ethel Haythornthwaite MBE
- Haythornthwaite in the 1950s
- Born: Ethel Mary Bassett Ward; 18 January 1894; Sheffield, West Riding of Yorkshire, England
- Died: 11 April 1986 (aged 92); Sheffield, England
- Burial place: Crookes Cemetery, Sheffield, England
- Education: West Heath; London University
- Occupation: Environmental campaigner
- Known for: Countryside protection; Town and country planning
- Notable work: CPRE; Friends of the Peak District; Sheffield Green Belt; Peak District National Park; Longshaw Estate
- Spouses: Henry Gallimore (m. 1916; died 1917) Gerald Haythornthwaite (m. 1937)
- Children: 1
- Father: Thomas Ward
- Relatives: George Bassett (great-uncle)

Ethel Mary Bassett Haythornthwaite (née Ward) MBE (18 January 1894 – 11 April 1986) was an English environmental campaigner, activist and poet. She was a pioneer of countryside protection as well as town and country planning both locally and nationally.

She founded the Sheffield Association for the Protection of Rural Scenery, also known as the Sheffield Association for the Protection of Local Countryside in 1924, which became the local branch of CPRE in 1927, and worked to protect the countryside of the Peak District from development. She forefronted the appeal to save the 747-acre Longshaw Estate from development, and helped acquire land around Sheffield that became its green belt. She was appointed to the UK government’s National Parks Committee, and helped to make the successful case for the National Parks and Access to the Countryside Act 1949, which led to the founding of the Peak District National Park in 1951. She also helped make green belts part of government policy in 1955. She was awarded an MBE in the 1947 New Years Honours List for her services to the countryside.

In 1963, she was awarded an honorary master's degree by Sheffield University.

== Early life and education ==
Ethel Mary Bassett Ward was born on 18 January 1894 at the family house on Millhouses Lane, Sheffield. She was the daughter of Mary Sophia Ward (née Bassett) and Thomas William Ward. Her parents were both Methodists and of notable Sheffield families. Her mother was part of the Bassett's sweets dynasty. Haythornthwaite was the great-niece of George Bassett (1818-1886), a noted politician and founder of the confectionary firm. Her father was a wealthy industrialist who built his family a large mansion on Endcliffe Vale Road which he called Endcliffe Vale House. She had three brothers and one sister; Thomas Leonard Ward, Alan Bassett Ward, Frank Joseph Ward and Gertrude Miller Ward. She grew up in a life of privilege surrounded by horses and carriages.

=== Education ===
Haythornthwaite, and her sister, went to an elite private school, West Heath in London. She excelled at English and Literature. She went on to read English at London University. Her love of literature led her to also study the romantic poets such as Wordsworth, Coleridge and Blake.

== Personal life and marriage ==
Haythornthwaite kept many diaries from an early age and was a frequent letter writer.

She was married twice. On 26 February 1916, during World War I, she married Henry Gallimore, a captain in the Royal Field Artillery. On 26 May 1917, Gallimore was killed whilst in combat over in France; she was widowed at the age of 23. In 1937, she married Gerald Haythornthwaite, a lieutenant colonel in the army who served overseas in Norway during World War II.

== Countryside protection ==
Devastated following the death of her first husband, Haythornthwaite became ill and her family encouraged her to take restorative walks in the countryside. She soon became enamoured of the rural beauty surrounding the city of Sheffield, and decided to apply herself to protecting the countryside from development and urban sprawl.

=== Campaign to Protect Rural England Peak District and South Yorkshire ===
In 1924, Haythornthwaite founded the Sheffield Association for the Protection of Rural Scenery, also known as the Sheffield Association for the Protection of Local Countryside, which in 1927 became the Peak District and South Yorkshire branch of the CPRE (Council for the Preservation of Rural England, later renamed Campaign to Protect Rural England). She was to be secretary of the branch for 56 years from its inception.

=== Longshaw Estate ===
In 1927, the Duke of Rutland sold the Longshaw Estate to the Sheffield Corporation. Prior to this sale the Corporation had purchased over 3,000 acres of moorland.

In 1928, Haythornthwaite spearheaded an urgent appeal to the Yorkshire public, which helped Peak District and South Yorkshire CPRE to raise the funds to buy the 747-acre Estate, which was threatened with development.

The Estate was gifted to the National Trust in 1931.

=== Sheffield's Green Belt ===
In 1932, Haythornthwaite helped acquire a further 448 acres of threatened land at Blacka Moor. In 1938, this became part of Sheffield's Green Belt (the first to be created in England). She also was instrumental in the purchase and protection of other rural areas including Whirlow Moor, Dore Moor, Dovedale, and many other surrounding rural areas.

Haythornthwaite wrote, at the start of World War II when many of her fellow CPRE administrators were away on active service:

"Unquestionably, CPRE and all its branches should strive their best to hold on. If not, much more of England’s beauty will be lost for those who return after the war. I believe our aims are too profoundly important to let go. Those who see what rural England means to the English should work to save it."

Haythornthwaite spent most of 1942 in London, "leading the national organisation in the crucial early debates on how the post-war reconstruction of the country should be achieved by democratic planning".

=== National Parks and Access to the Countryside Act 1949 ===
In 1945, Haythornthwaite was appointed to the UK government’s National Parks Committee, and her hard work there helped to deliver the 1949 National Parks and Access to the Countryside Act.

=== First UK National Park ===
Much to Haythornthwaite's delight, and in no small part due to her endeavours, in 1951 the Peak District became the UK's first national park.

=== National Green Belt Policy ===
In 1955, Haythornthwaite helped form national government policy on green belts. She stressed their importance to city dwellers:

"My childhood impressions of the city were a gloomy, noisy, shapeless phenomenon. But outside the city – there one began to live. The escape into clean air, the gradual return to nature – with this came satisfaction, peace, freedom, solitude, excitement. One grew to become conscious of its profounder value, something beyond health and high spirits – something to worship."

== Death ==
Haythornthwaite died after a long period of illness in 1986, aged 92. She is buried in Crookes Cemetery, Sheffield alongside her husband, her father, mother and sister.

== Legacy ==
“Whatever else is forgotten, the Branch [Peak District and South Yorkshire branch of the CPRE] will go down in history as a major force in environmental conservation because of the achievement of its two ‘grand purposes’: the designation of a national park in the Peak District and the creation of a permanent Sheffield Green Belt. But there were so many more equally successful campaigns in the wider countryside and urban fringe that the reader gasps with admiration. And at the head of this crusading society for so long, the tireless, single-minded, and selfless Ethel and Gerald Haythornthwaite were without parallel. We shall not see the likes of Ethel and Gerald again.”

— Sir Chris Bonington, Protecting the Beautiful Frame 2001 book by Melvyn Jones

=== Haythornthwaite Wood ===
In 1994, eight years after Haythornthwaite died, a woodland was planted near Dore in honour of the charity founders. It is located on the edge of Sheffield, approximately 1 km from the boundary of the Peak District National Park.

The woodland itself was saved from housing development as part of the 1936 Whirlow Bridge to Dore Moore campaign.

=== Peak District Boundary Walk ===
On 17 June 2017, in celebration of Britain's first National Park, the Friends of the Peak District launched the Peak District Boundary Walk. It was officially opened by Emma Bridgewater, President of the CPRE, outside Buxton Town Hall. The route consists of twenty stages that broadly follows the park's boundary, as envisaged by Haythornthwaite and her husband, covering a total distance of 190 miles.

=== Heritage Open Days ===
In September 2018, during Heritage Open Days in Sheffield, two illustrated talks were given about Haythornthwaite's life and work.

Date	Talk	Speaker	Occupation	Venue
9 September 2018	Ethel Haythornthwaite (1894–1986): Her Legacy for Sheffield and the Peak District	Jean Smart	Haythornthwaite's secretary (from 1963 to 1995)	Sheffield Botanical Gardens
6 September 2018	Ethel Haythornthwaite: A Sheffield Woman of Considerable Consequences	Clyde Binfield	Professor Emeritus in History, University of Sheffield	Regather Co-operative, Sharrow, Sheffield

=== Restoration of graves ===
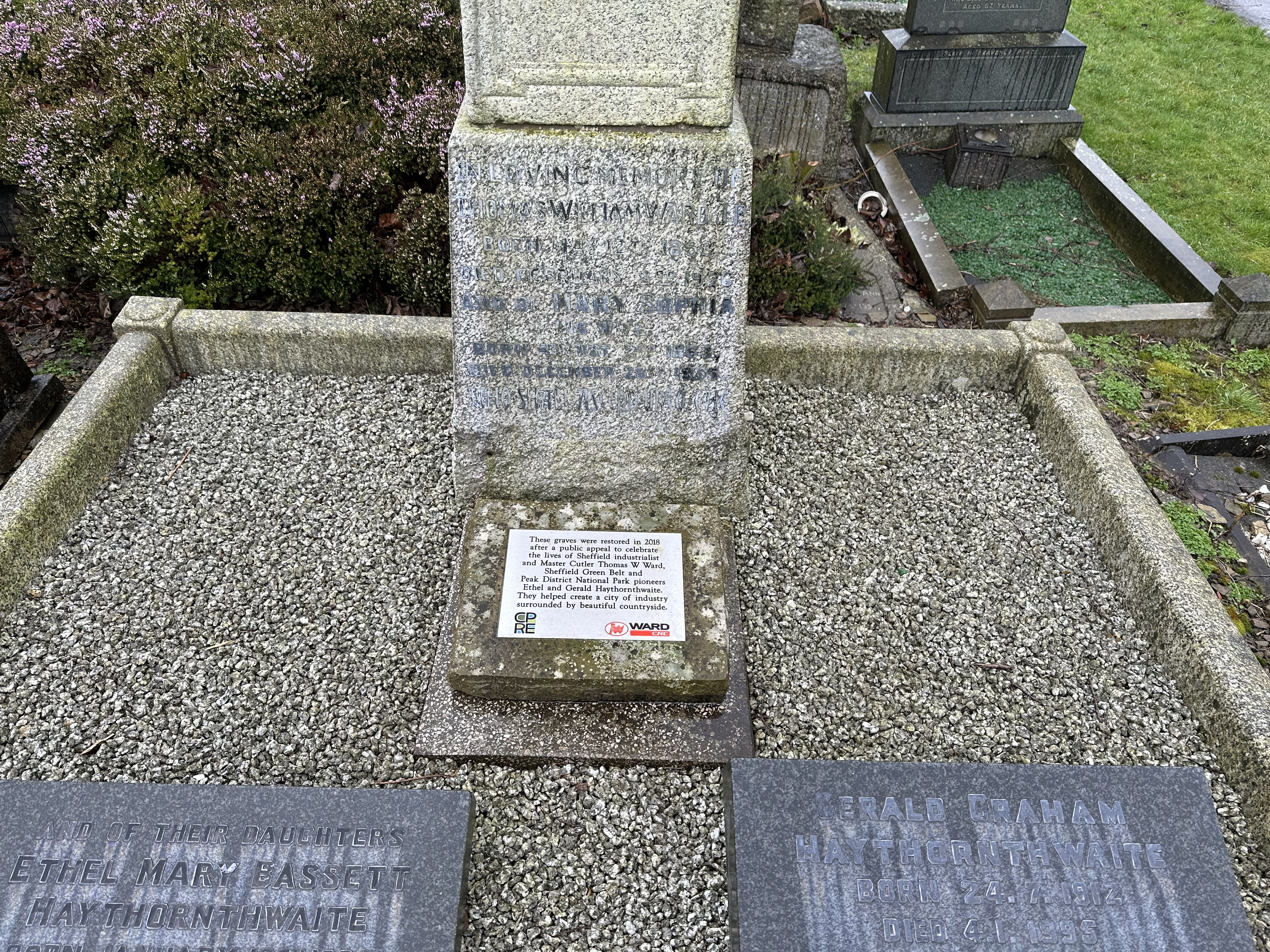
Graves of Ward and Haythornthwaite restored in 2018 with achievements plaque

In February 2016, a local resident reported that he found the graves of two of Sheffield's most generous philanthropists were neglected.

Councillor Sioned-Mair Richards, cabinet member for neighbourhoods at Sheffield Council said:

“The maintenance of privately bought memorials is always the responsibility of the family or purchaser. The graves of Sir Stuart Goodwin and Lt Col Gerald Haythornthwaite are private memorials and therefore their families are responsible for maintaining them.

“We acknowledge the significant contributions they made to the city and those of the many others buried in our cemeteries who gave generously, fought bravely and were champions for Sheffield.

“And whilst we would like to be able to maintain all neglected memorials, we have never funded private graves because budget pressures make it impossible for us.

“We have no objections to repairs being carried out and should the family or purchaser wish to instruct a stone mason we can provide information to help them do this.”

Following a public appeal in 2018, the graves of Haythornthwaite and her husband as well as her father and mother were restored.

A new plaque and monument at the site marks this event and explicitly acknowledges some of the achievements of Haythornthwaite.

=== Countryfile ===
On 7 April 2019, Haythornthwaite's work was featured in the BBC1 television programme Countryfile. The episode marked the 70th anniversary of the national parks of the United Kingdom and covered the impact of her legacy in Sheffield and the Peak District.

=== Campaign for National Parks tribute video ===
In October 2019, the Campaign for National Parks released a 6-minute video to celebrate the 70th anniversary of the National Parks. The video featured actress Caroline Quentin, who was President of the CNP at the time, as well as numerous voiceovers of key individuals.

One of the individuals featured was Jean Smart, who served as secretary to the Haythornthwaites and a countryside campaigner herself. Smart talked about the importance of the Haythornthwaites' work in the Peak District. Smart also mentions how it was Ethel Haythornthwaite's vision for the soldiers post-war to come home to their Jerusalem, a reference to the poem by one of her favourite poets, William Blake.

=== Trespass debate ===
On 19 April 2021, during a trespass debate, Olivia Blake MP for Sheffield Hallam referenced Haythornthwaite as she opposed the Government's proposal to impose harsher measures.

=== The Ethels ===
In May 2021, the summit of 95 hills in the Peak District of England were named the Ethels in her honour, similar to the Munros in Scotland or Wainwrights in the Lake District.

=== Blue plaque ===
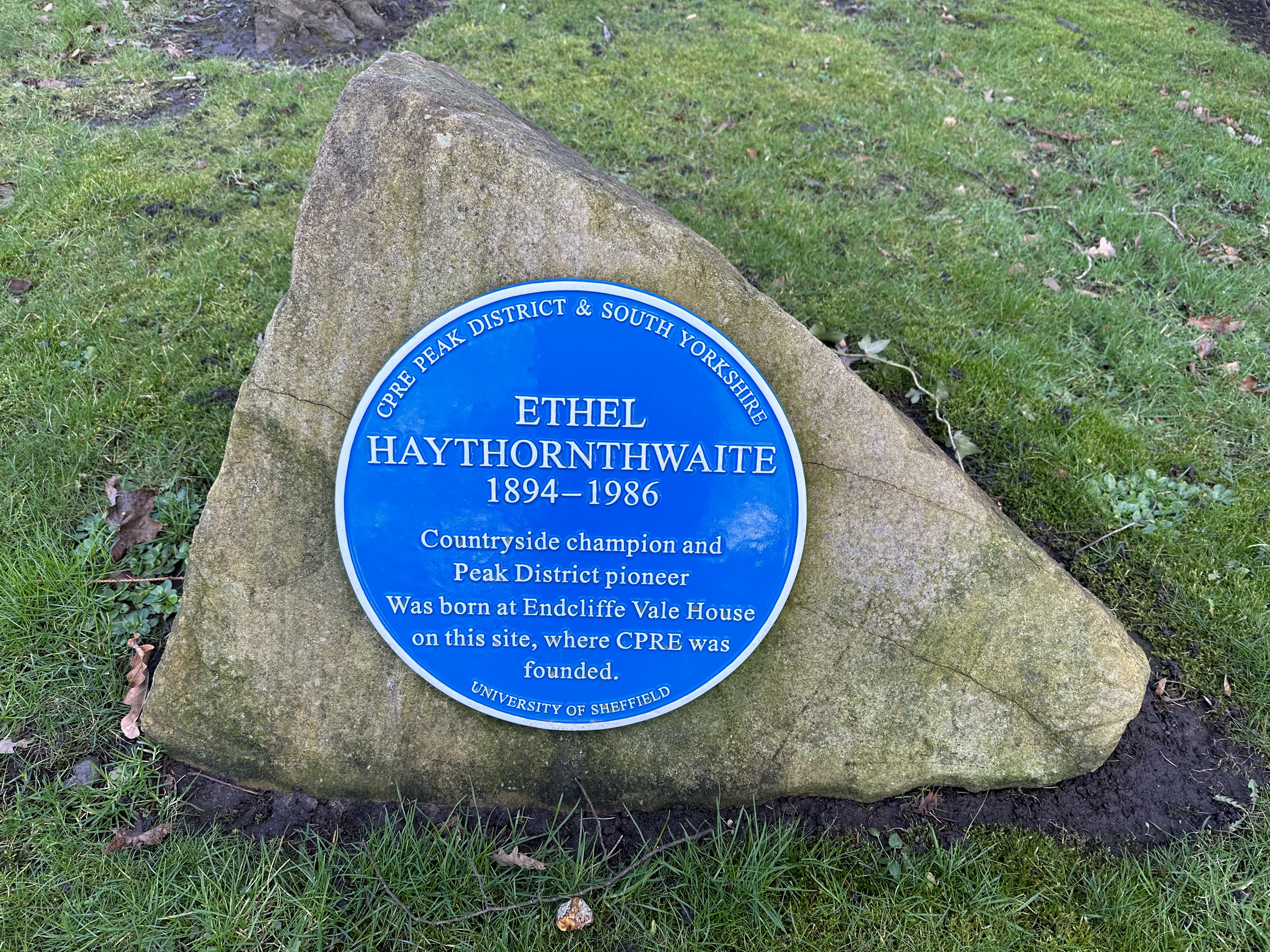
Blue plaque found at Endcliffe Student Village

On 2 August 2021, a campaign to honour Haythornthwaite was started by The Star newspaper, the Campaign for the Protection of Rural England Peak District and South Yorkshire (CPRE PDSY), Blake, University of Sheffield and former Lord Mayor Councillor Anne Murphy. CPRE had previously created a crowdfunding appeal campaign on GoFundMe on 20 July 2021. It successfully achieved its target amount, with a total amount of £591.

On 25 May 2022, a blue plaque to commemorate the life of one of Sheffield and the Peak District’s leading environmentalists and most influential women was put in place. The plaque is located at the old site where she lived, Endcliffe Vale House, which is now a student village. The plaque, which rests on a stone from the Peak District, was officially unveiled by Dame Fiona Reynolds DBE, the CPRE Peak District and South Yorkshire branch president and an honorary graduate of the University of Sheffield.

=== Other plaques and planned memorials ===
In August 2021, Tomo Thompson, CEO of CPRE PDSY and a former mayor of Sheffield, stated that there was a plaque in honour of Haythornthwaite at Longshaw and a small tribute located at Dore. Later that month, Murphy suggested that more should be done to recognise the impact of Haythornthwaite's achievements and who she was, perhaps "something within the city centre and a road named after her".

=== Haythornthwaite biography ===
A biography of Haythornthwaite, Ethel: The biography of countryside pioneer Ethel Haythornthwaite, by poet and author Helen Mort, was published on 7 May 2024.

=== 100 years of CPRE Peak District and South Yorkshire ===
On 8 March 2024, to celebrate International Women's Day and 100 years of CPRE PDSY, the National Trust hosted a talk on the life and work of Haythornthwaite followed by a guided walk up Higger Tor, the closest Ethel to Longshaw Estate.

== See also ==
- List of people from Sheffield
- List of blue plaques
