= Thomas William Ward =

Thomas William Ward may refer to:

- Thomas W. Ward (1807–1872), mayor of Austin, Texas
- Thomas William Ward (industrialist) (1853–1926), scrap metal merchant and shipbreaker from Sheffield, England
