= James Zabiela =

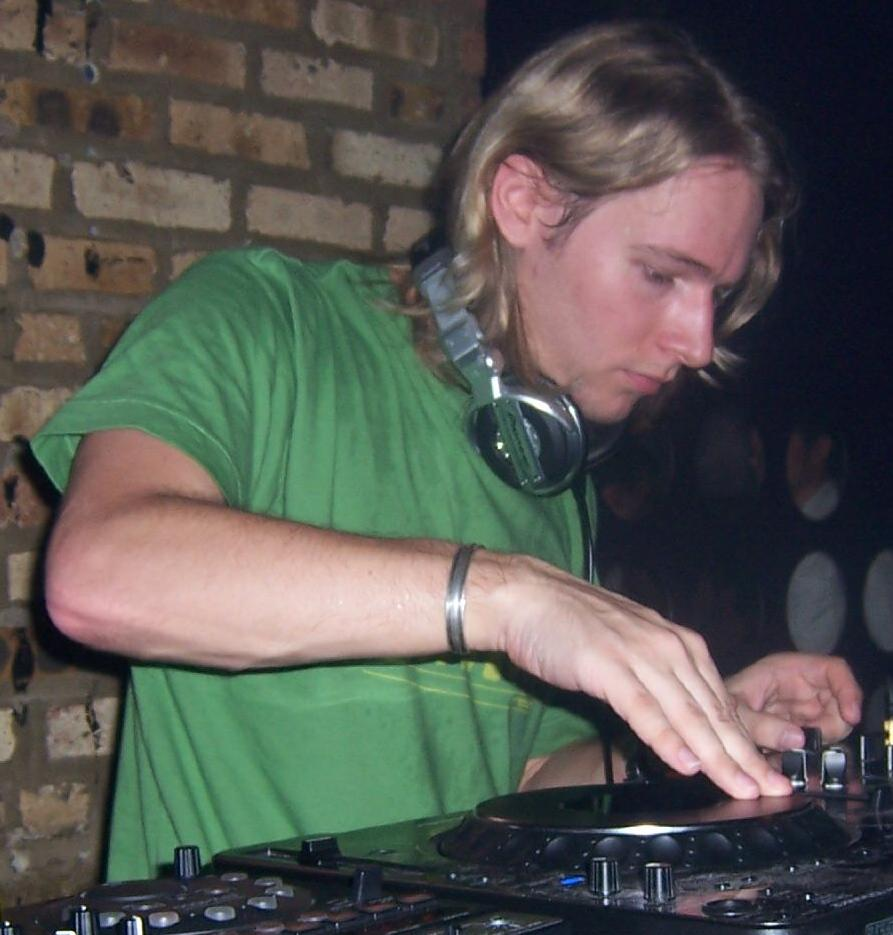
- Zabiela in 2006

Background information
- Born: 7 August 1979 (age 47)
- Origin: Southampton, England
- Genres: Electronic, House
- Occupation: Disc jockey
- Instrument: Ableton Live - Pioneer CDJs - Pioneer EFX-1000 - Pioneer DJM-900 - Pioneer RMX-1000, iPad
- Label: Born Electric
- Website: www.jameszabiela.com

James Zabiela (born 7 August 1979), is a British DJ and producer from Southampton, England.

In his early years his signature style was a fusion of Breakbeat and progressive house music; more recently, however, he is regarded as a progressive house, techno and acid house DJ although his use of Breakbeat music is still key to some parts of his sets. He is known for his turntable skills, extensive use of loops and effects, and the use of Pioneer CDJ-2000s, EFX1000, RMX1000 as well as using Ableton Live with various controllers and sometimes an iPad.

Zabiela first gained fame in 2000 by winning Muzik Magazine's Bedroom Bedlam competition, Best Bedroom Bedlam DJ 2001.

Since 2005, he has received sponsorships from Japanese manufacturer Pioneer, a relationship which continues until today.

== Discography ==
=== Original tracks ===
- 2005 "Skanksuary" (Renaissance)
- 2005 "Robophobia" (Renaissance)
- 2005 "EyeAMComputer" (Renaissance)
- 2006 "Weird Science" (Renaissance)
- 2007 "Rover" (W/ Nic Fanciulli as One + One) (MOS)
- 2007 "No Pressure" (W/ Nic Fanciulli as One + One) (MOS)
- 2007 "Human" (Original Mix) (Renaissance)
- 2008 "Human" (Intro Mix) (Renaissance)
- 2008 "No Other Way But Down" (Renaissance)
- 2008 "Perseverance" (Renaissance)
- 2008 "Phaser Fire" (Renaissance)
- 2009 "Tylium" (Bedrock Recordings)
- 2010 "Burnt Bridges" (Renaissance)
- 2011 "Blame" (Hope Recordings)
- 2011 "Darkness by Design"
- 2012 "The Healing" (Born Electric)

=== Remixes ===
- 2002 Röyksopp - "Remind Me" (Zabiela's Ingeborg Mix) (Wall of Sound)
- 2002 Pole Folder & CP - "Dust" (Zabiela's Dakota Bar Slam) (Bedrock)
- 2002 Boomclick - "Homegrown" (Zabiela Remix) (Sunday Best)
- 2003 Dave Brennan - "Drink Deep" (Zabiela's Vox Version) (Sunday Best)
- 2003 Edward Shearmur - "Taxi Ride" (JZ DJ Re-edit)
- 2004 Ficta - "Eli" (Zabiela's Rave Lizard Mix) (Global Underground)
- 2004 Ficta - "Eli" (Zabiela's Rave Lizard Reprise) (Global Underground)
- 2004 Luke Vibert - 'Ambalek' (Zabiela's Delboy Edit) (Renaissance)
- 2005 Sasha & Mike Koglin - 'Enjoy The Gravy' (James Zabiela's Totally Turntabled Mix) (Noys Music)
- 2006 Charlie May vs. Sasha - "Seal Clubbing" (James Zabiela Seal Squeal Remix) (Renaissance)
- 2008 Spooky - Candy (James Zabiela Remix) (spooky.uk.com)
- 2008 Ladytron - Runaway (James Zabiela's Red Eye Remix) (Nettwerk UK)
- 2008 Radiohead - Reckoner (James Zabiela's Tweezers on a Towel Rail Remix) (White)
- 2009 Orbital - Impact (James Zabiela Scorched Earth Remix)
- 2009 Rennie Foster - Devil's Water (James Zabiela's "More Umph" Edit) (Rebirth)
- 2013 Spectrasoul 'The Curb' (James Zabiela Remix) (Shogun Audio)
- 2016 Pedram 'Cloned' (James Zabiela Tempo Refix) (Born Electric)
- 2020 Bochum Welt 'More Light' (James Zabiela Remix) (CPU Records)

=== Mix CDs ===
- 2002: FOUR - discs 1-4 (promo)
- 2002: Reason Mix (Xmag)
- 2002: GTDJ001 (Groovetech)
- 2003: Sound in Motion (Hooj Choons)
- 2004: ALiVE [Renaissance]
- 2005: Utilities [Renaissance]
- 2005: FOUR-2 - disc 0 (aka: Rendered), discs 1-4 (promo)
- 2005: DJ Face-Off Meat Katie vs. James Zabiela (DJ Magazine)
- 2006: FOUR-3 - discs 1-4 (promo) AKA: Proton Pack
- 2006: The Appliance of Science (DJ Magazine)
- 2007: James Zabiela and Nic Fanciulli present One+One (W/ Nic Fanciulli)(MOS)
- 2007: FOUR-4 - discs 1-4 (promo)
- 2009: Renaissance: The Masters Series Part 12 (Renaissance)
- 2010: Renaissance: The Masters Series 'Life' (Part 15) (Renaissance)
- 2010: Mixmag- Destination: Future
- 2013: Resident Advisor Mix
- 2015: Quantinuity (Promo)
- 2018: Balance 029 (Balance Music)
