= Lizzie (elephant) =

Elephant used as draft animal during WW1

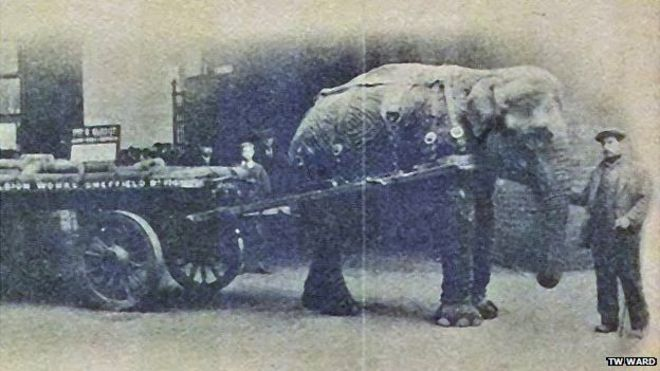
- Species: Indian elephant
- Sex: Female
- Employer: Thomas W. Ward
- Years active: 1916–?
- Owner: William Sedgwick
- Residence: Sheffield

Lizzie was an Indian elephant used by Thos. W. Ward Ltd. to transport scrap metal in Sheffield during World War I.

== Before 1916 ==
Lizzie was part of Sedgwick's Menagerie, a travelling menagerie owned by William Sedgwick. She was first brought to Sheffield when the Sedgwick's Menagerie wintered near Wicker Arches.

== 1916–1918 ==
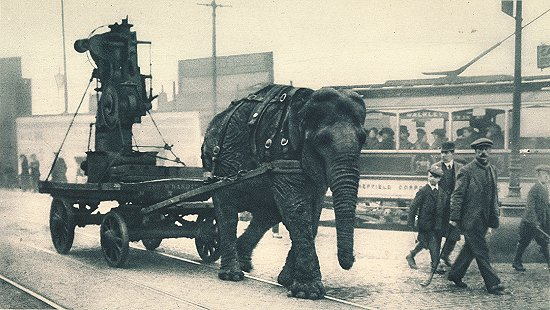
Lizzie pulling an apparatus

During the First World War, many horses were taken from private hands for the war effort, including at least three belonging to Thos. W. Ward Ltd. To replace these horses, owner Thomas W. Ward rented Lizzie from Sedgwick's around February 1916. To prepare Lizzie for pulling carts around the Thos. W. Ward yards, she was outfitted with a custom harness and leather boots to protect her feet from any metal lying on the ground (which was prevalent on the Thos. W. Ward yards). Although an unorthodox replacement, Lizzie was well suited to the task. She had been accustomed to training while in the menagerie, and was used to being around many people. In fact, there are stories of her stealing an apple from someone's pocket, a hat off of a young boy's head, and even taking a dinner through someone's window with her trunk. Another story claims she knocked a traction engine over whilst playing with it like a toy. Lizzie quickly became a well-loved icon of the city. Many locals would even bring Lizzie treats.

Camels, likely also from Sedgwick's Menagerie, were employed in similar fashion around Sheffield. However, they never became as popular among the local citizens as Lizzie did.

== After the war ==
What happened to Lizzie at the end of the war is unclear. It is possible that she may have continued to work for Thos. W. Ward, as she could replace three horses, and had become a sort of "mascot" for the company. It is also possible that she may have gone to farm work. Multiple elephants were already being used to plow fields in Horley, and the ground would have been more forgiving on her feet than the cobblestone streets of Sheffield. Another theory is that Lizzie returned to Sedgwick's Menagerie.

== Legacy ==
The 2016 Herd of Sheffield was inspired by the story of Lizzie. In 2023, a commemorative plaque was put onto the stable where Lizzie was kept. Area locals sometimes use the phrase "done up like Tommy Ward's elephant" to refer to someone who must carry a lot of weight. A Sheffield Community Transport bus was named Lizzie Ward in her honour.

== See also ==
- War elephant
