= Friends of the Peak District =

Charity protecting England's first National Park

- Predecessor: Sheffield Association for the Protection of Local Scenery
- Successor: CPRE Peak District and South Yorkshire
- Formation: 1924
- Founder: Ethel Haythornthwaite
- Type: Charitable organisation
- Registration no.: Registered charity number: 1094975
- Headquarters: Victoria Hall, 37 Stafford Road, Sheffield, S2 2SF
- Region served: England
- Members: 1,000
- President: Dame Fiona Reynolds
- Chair: Chris Heard
- Chief Executive: Tomo Thompson
- Staff: 5
- Volunteers: c.30
- Website: Official website

The Friends of the Peak District is a UK registered charity which campaigns to protect England's Peak District National Park. The organisation is a branch of the Campaign to Protect Rural England (CPRE), whose purpose is "to promote and encourage for the benefit of the public the improvement and protection of the English countryside and the better development of the rural environment".

== Background ==
The area covered by the branch includes: the Peak District National Park; the Derbyshire High Peak; the parishes of Barlow, Holmesfield, Dronfield, Eckington, Unstone and Killamarsh in the North East Derbyshire District Council and the Metropolitan Districts of Sheffield, Rotherham, Barnsley and Doncaster.

The charity began as the Sheffield Association for the Protection of Local Scenery in 1924 (founded by Ethel Haythornthwaite) and became a branch of the Council for the Preservation of Rural England representing Sheffield and the Peak District in 1927. In 1938, the branch was instrumental in establishing the Sheffield Green Belt, the first in the country; in 1951, the Peak District became the UK’s first National Park. The charity rebranded itself as Friends of the Peak District in 2002 but still represented CPRE in the Peak District and South Yorkshire.

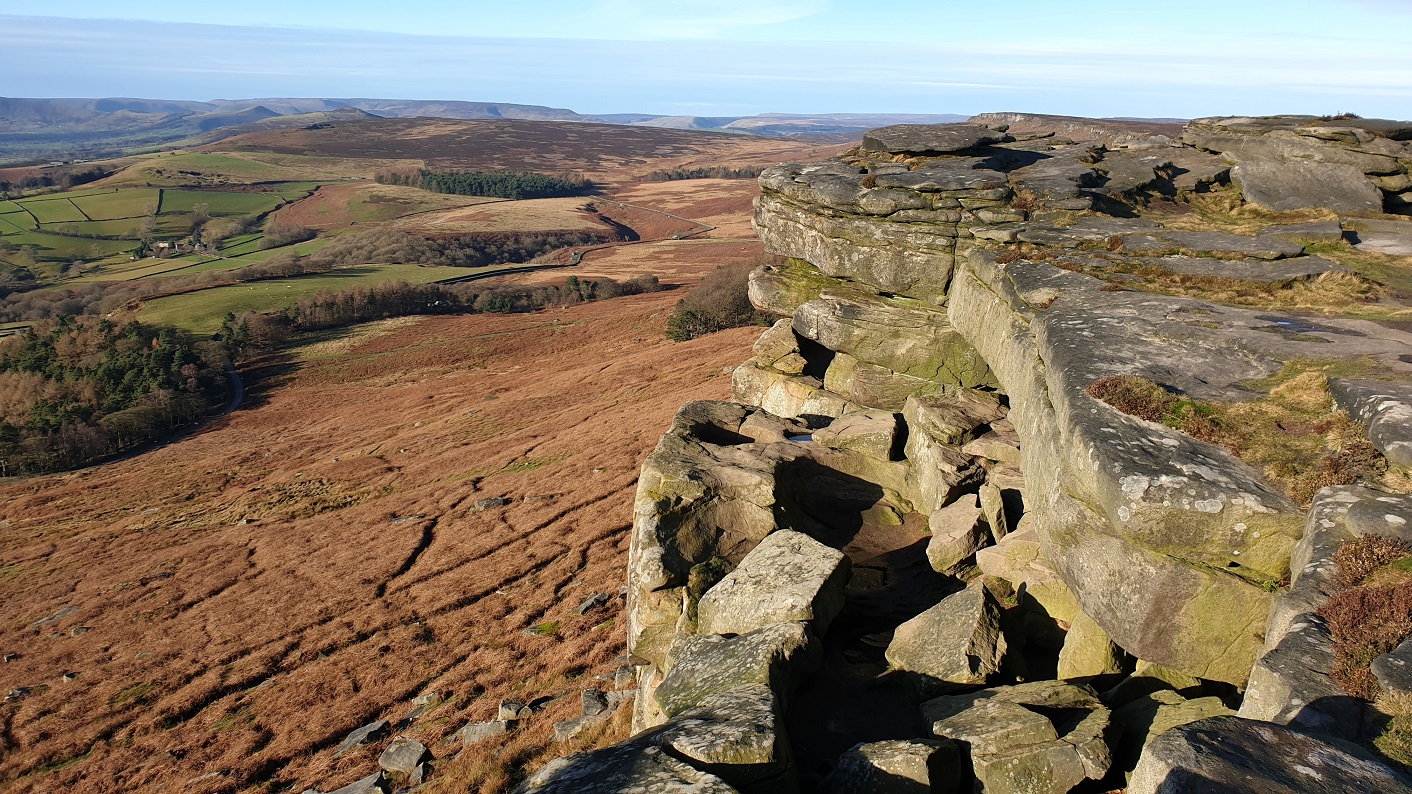
Stanage Edge near Hathersage

The charity is also a member of the Campaign for National Parks.

TV presenter Julia Bradbury was President of the charity from 2008 to 2016 and remains a Vice President.

In 2017, the Friends of the Peak District launched the Peak District Boundary Walk in Buxton. It is a 200-mile long distance route which circumnavigates the National Park.

In 2020, the charity decided to revert to being known as CPRE Peak District and South Yorkshire and to only retain the Friends of the Peak District brand for the Boundary Walk.

In May 2021 the Peak District and South Yorkshire branch of CPRE announced The Ethels, 95 hills in the Peak District, as a tribute to Ethel Haythornthwaite.

The charity's campaign papers from the 1920s to the 1990s were given to Sheffield Archives and Derbyshire Record Office in 2007, with an additional deposit of papers up to 2022 given to Sheffield Archives in 2022.

== Campaigns ==
The charity's campaigns include:

- Fracking
- Quarrying
- Take Back The Tracks
- Litter and Fly-tipping
- Undergrounding
- Houses and Buildings
- Rural Livelihoods
- Climate Change
