= Herd of Sheffield =

Public art trail in Sheffield, England

- Herd of Sheffield logo
- Date: 21 June – 30 September 2016 (Herd of Sheffield); 11 July – 5 October 2016 (Little Herd); 14–16 October 2016 (Farewell Weekend); 20 October 2016 (Auction)
- Venue: Crucible Theatre (Auction); Meadowhall Centre (Farewell Weekend)
- Location: Sheffield
- Type: Art exhibition; Charity auction
- Theme: Elephant sculptures
- Cause: Sheffield Children's Hospital
- Organised by: Wild in Art
- Website: www.herdofsheffield.com

The Herd of Sheffield was a charity event in the summer of 2016 in Sheffield, England. Wild in Art organised the public art trail, which was run in aid of the Sheffield Children's Hospital Charity. The theme of the project revolved around sculptures of elephants. There were four main parts of the event:

- Little Herd Trail (21 June - 30 September 2016)
- Herd of Sheffield Trail (11 July - 5 October 2016)
- Farewell Weekend (4 - 6 October 2016)
- Auction (20 October 2016)

== Inspiration ==
=== Choice of a theme ===
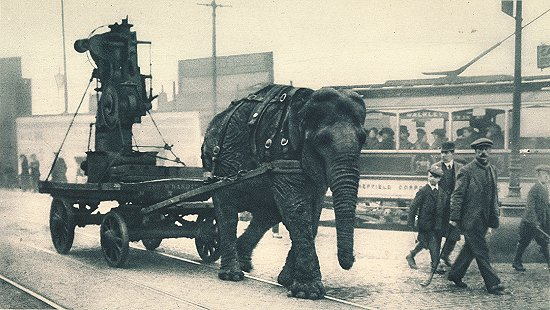
Lizzie pulling ammunition in 1916.

The inspiration for the elephant theme was that 2016 would be the 100th anniversary of Sheffield's first use of a war elephant. Lizzie the Elephant hauled ammunition, machinery and raw materials to and from the city's steel factories. Three of the 58 sculptures are named after Lizzie. The use of war elephants in the United Kingdom increased during the First World War because many horses were taken away for military use. Approximately eight million horses died in the war.

Some artists drew inspiration from the First World War to mark Lizzie's anniversary, for example one elephant was painted in a dazzle camouflage pattern, while others incorporated local themes such as Henderson's Relish into their artworks.

=== Cause ===
The event raised money for the Sheffield Children's Hospital, with the aim of funding the purchase of a fluoroscopy machine. Aside from the auction, money was raised through selling merchandise such as pens, toy elephants, maps and souvenir books. Rebecca Staden of the Sheffield Children's Hospital Charity devised the idea of an elephant trail and contacted the Yorkshire-based company Wild in Art, which specialises in organising mass public participation art events, to help the idea come to fruition.

== Herd of Sheffield ==
The Herd of Sheffield refers both to the whole project and the group of large elephants (to distinguish them from the Little Herd). The 1.6-metre-tall (5.2 ft) fiberglass elephants were given to local artists who were tasked with decorating them however they chose. In total, 58 large elephant sculptures were designed. As it was the main source of income, the large herd was deemed the most important part of the fundraising project. The event was formally announced on 22 October 2015 alongside the unveiling of the first-completed sculpture.

On 11 July 2016, the Herd of Sheffield Trail started: all 58 elephants were put on display at different locations around the city. Each elephant was accompanied by a plaque with the elephant's name and description on it. A QR code was also provided for each elephant, enabling users of a dedicated app to scan the code and collect discounts from local companies. Thousands of people went on the trail to participate in the interactive public art event, which involved travelling to see all of the elephants. Maps and guidebooks were published to aid elephant spotters.

=== List of elephants ===
The list below gives the titles of the sculptures, their creators, their exhibition location and their auction price.

Name	Creator	Exhibition location	Auction price (£)
Elmer the Patchwork Elephant	Sheffield Children's Hospital patients	Weston Park	8,500
Inconelly	Pressure Technologies	Fargate	8,200
AM	Matthew Cooper	Sheffield Town Hall	16,500
Effie	Geo Law	Castle Square	7,000
Our City, Our Home	Alan Pennington	South Street	4,200
Interst-Elephant	Josh and Aimee Williams	Barker's Pool	5,600
Sheffield Elephant	Josh and Aimee Williams	Orchard Square	11,000
An Elephant Never Forgets Where He Came From	Caroline Greyling	Fargate	7,000
It's Parade Day	Clare Pentlow	Tudor Square	5,000
Birdy	Coralie Turpin-Thomson	Cheney Row	5,500
Peace Elephant	Rocket 01	Lady's Bridge	3,500
Fairytale Elephant	Carolyn Short	Sheffield Cathedral	5,700
The Elephant in the Hive	Caroline Greyling	Ponds Forge	11,000
I Follow a Different Herd	Creative in Crystal	Victoria Quays	5,200
The Warrior	Deven Bhurke	Sheffield railway station	7,800
Henry the Constructor	Deven Bhurke	Botanical Gardens	5,000
Sheffield Botanical	Ella Osborne	Barkers Pool	5,200
All as One	Emma Jackson	The Moor Quarter	5,200
Herd & Bird	Finger Industries	Winter Garden	4,800
Topsy	Florence Blanchard	Butchers Works	6,300
Lingo the Elephant	Geo Law	Furnival Square	7,500
Elephant Inside Out	Gillian Higgins	The Hubs	6,000
In it Together	James Croft	Botanical Gardens	6,800
Donkeys in Elephant Land	James Green	Weston Park	6,000
Jungle Jim	Jenny Leonard	Peace Gardens	15,000
A Sheffield Summer	Jenny Leonard	Sheaf Square	6,200
The City Elephant	Jo Peel	Brown Street	6,600
Yorkshire Rose	Jonathan Wilkinson	Hillsborough Park Walled Garden	4,700
Elephantom	Kieron Reilly & Lynsey Brecknell	Sheffield United FC	4,100
SnookHerd	Kieron Reilly & Lynsey Brecknell	Tudor Square	7,000
Symbiosis	Laura Gray	Graves Park	7,000
Small Beginnings	Lisa Maltby	Botanical Gardens	7,600
Bugsy	Liz Hall	Weston Park	11,000
But Where's the Ladybird?	Lydia Monks	Meadowhall Centre	6,200
Hendophant	Matt Cockayne	Leavygreave Road	11,300
Tin Lizzie	Mik Richardson	BBC Radio Sheffield	6,500
Lizzietron 2.2	Nick Bax	Leafygreave Road	5,900
Marjorie	Pete McKee	Kelham Island	22,000
Stampeding Elegance	Kid Acne	Meadowhall	5,500
Razzle Dazzle ’em, Lizzie	Robert Hurst www.linkedin.com/in/roberthurst365	Arundel Gate	4,600
Forest Spirit	Faunagraphic	Victoria Quays	5,200
Holi	Sophie Green	St Paul's Place	4,700
Patchwork City	Sophie-Rose Wiberg	Fitzalan Square	4,400
Jackophant	Stephen McKay	Fargate	7,600
Skywalker	Stephen McKay	Meadowhall	7,500
Elmer's Aunty	Sue Guthrie	Forge Dam	5,000
Gulal Graffiti	Sue Guthrie	Sheaf Square	6,600
Heard Sheffield?	Temper	Tudor Square	7,800
Ellie	David Elliot Hoodith	Devonshire Green	8,000
The Elements of an Elephant	Ryan Patrick Morley	Paternoster Row	5,600
And... Repeat	Neil Carribine	The Moor	6,700
Izzy	Steve Millington	Sheffield Cathedral	8,700
Nelly Looking through the Looking Glass	Stoneface Creative	Our Cow Molly	5,400
The Beat Goes On	Tom J Newell	Crystal Peaks	6,500
Steel Elephant	Tom Clayton	Hallam Square	7,700
Blossom	Sue Webber	Crystal Peaks	7,300
Matisse's Last Assistant	Mark Alexander	Millennium Gallery	4,500
Technicolor Pachyderms	Rob Lee	Devonshire Green	5,200

== Little Herd ==
In addition to the main herd, a herd of 72 small elephant calves was made by over 70 local schools. The Little Herd was sponsored by Blundells and was displayed in groups at the following locations:

- Winter Gardens
- Crucible Theatre
- Sheffield Hallam University
- Atkinsons
- John Lewis
- The Art House
- Sheffield City Hall
- Ponds Forge
- Kelham Island
- Weston Park Museum
- Abbeydale Industrial Hamlet

== Farewell Weekend ==
After the main herd's display period was over, all 58 sculptures were assembled at Meadowhall Centre and displayed between 14 October and 16 October 2016 so viewers could see them one last time before the auction.

== Auction ==
On 20 October 2016, all 58 elephants of the main herd put on auction at the Crucible Theatre. Charles Hanson, best known for his work on Bargain Hunt, and Lucy Crapper were the auctioneers for the event, which raised £410,600.

The winning bidder for Summer donated his elephant to local school High Storrs after seeing their art teacher, who was the sculpture's designer, break into tears on losing the bid on behalf of the school.

== Sponsors ==
Numerous local businesses, organisations and educational institutions sponsored the project along with some national companies including Barclays, John Lewis and Irwin Mitchell.
