= Douglas Chalmers =

British Army general (born 1966)

Lieutenant General Douglas Chalmers CB DSO OBE
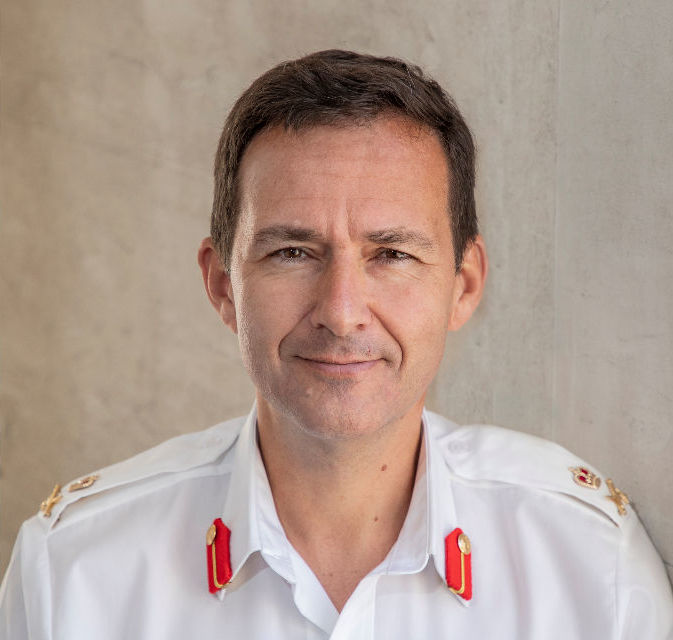
- Chalmers in 2018

Master of Emmanuel College, Cambridge
- Incumbent
- Assumed office 1 October 2021
- Preceded by: Fiona Reynolds

Personal details
- Born: Douglas McKenzie Chalmers; 26 February 1966 (age 60) Belfast, Northern Ireland
- Education: Reddam House, Berkshire
- Alma mater: School of Advanced Military Studies; Trinity Hall, Cambridge

Military service
- Allegiance: United Kingdom
- Branch/service: British Army
- Years of service: 1984–2022
- Rank: Lieutenant General
- Unit: Princess of Wales's Royal Regiment
- Commands: Task Force Helmand; 12th Mechanised Brigade; 2nd Battalion, Princess of Wales's Royal Regiment
- Battles/wars: Iraq War; War in Afghanistan; Operation Inherent Resolve
- Awards: Companion of the Order of the Bath; Distinguished Service Order; Officer of the Order of the British Empire; Commander 1st Class of the Order of the Dannebrog (Denmark)

Lieutenant General Douglas McKenzie Chalmers, CB, DSO, OBE (born 26 February 1966) is a former British Army officer who served as Deputy Chief of the Defence Staff (Military Strategy & Operations) from 2018 to 2021. He is currently Master of Emmanuel College, Cambridge.

== Early life and education ==
Chalmers was born on 26 February 1966 in Belfast, Northern Ireland. He grew up in England. He was educated at Bearwood House, a private school in Berkshire, England. Following school, he worked laying tarmac during the day and studying to re-take his A-Levels by night.

Chalmers later completed a Master of Arts (MA) degree from the United States Army's School of Advanced Military Studies and a Master of Philosophy (MPhil) degree from Trinity Hall, Cambridge.

== Military career ==
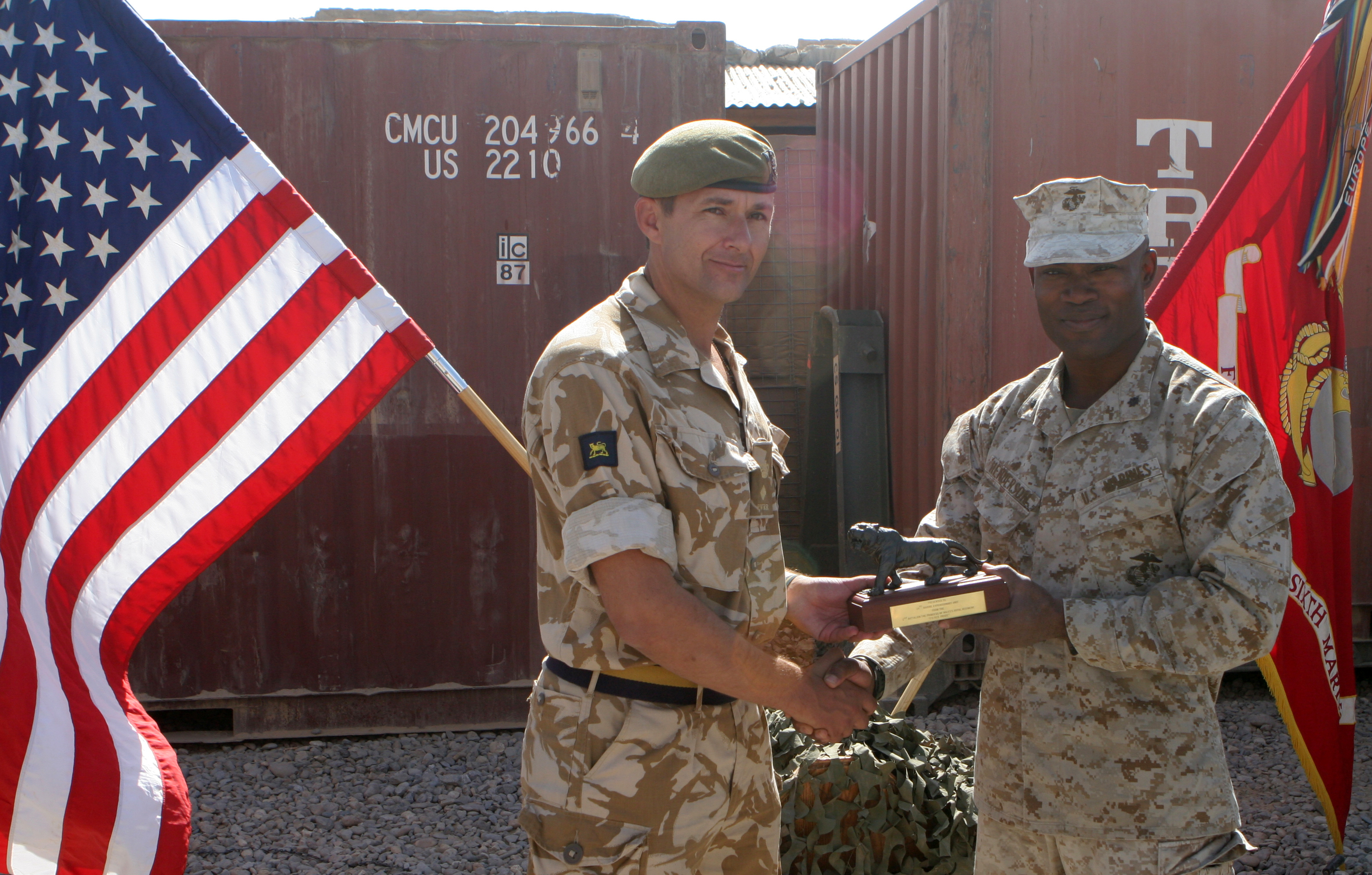
Chalmers (left) at the change of command ceremony in Afghanistan, 2008

Chalmers joined the British Army in 1984 as a private. Having attended the Royal Military Academy Sandhurst, he was commissioned into the Royal Irish Rangers on 9 August 1986.

He became commanding officer of the 2nd Battalion, Princess of Wales's Royal Regiment in July 2007 and, in that role, was deployed to Helmand Province, Afghanistan. He went on to become commander of the 12th Mechanized Brigade in October 2011 and was deployed as commander of Task Force Helmand in April 2012. After that he became the Chief of the Defence Staff's Liaison Officer to the United States Chairman of the Joint Chiefs of Staff in October 2013 and Assistant Chief of Staff (Operations) at Permanent Joint Headquarters in August 2014.

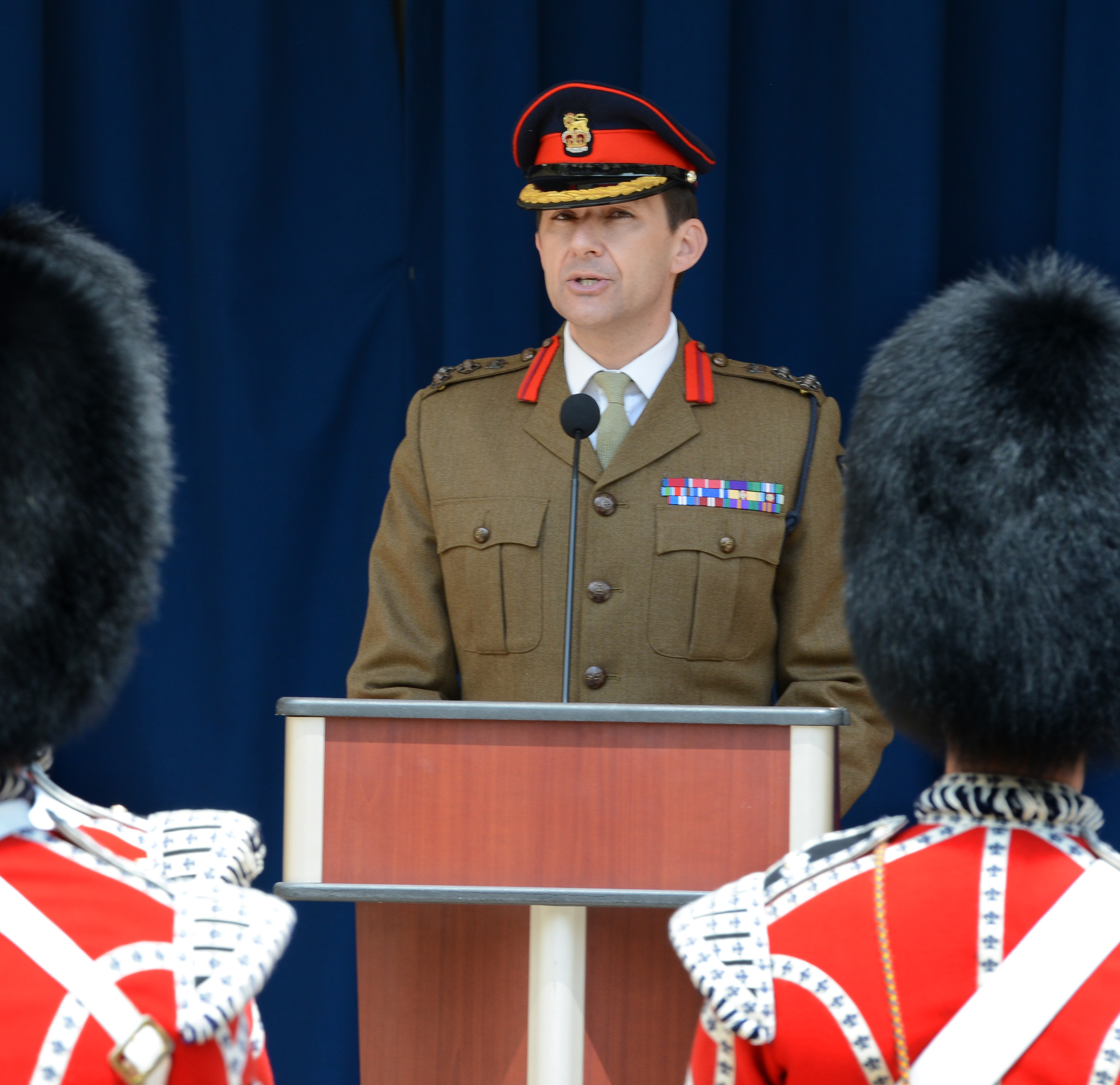
Brigadier Chalmers addressing a crowd in 2014

Chalmers was deployed on Operation Inherent Resolve in Iraq in September 2015, and became Deputy Commanding General-Support, III Corps and Fort Hood in August 2016. He was appointed Commander 1st Class of the Order of the Dannebrog by the Queen of Denmark in May 2018. He was promoted to lieutenant general and was appointed Deputy Chief of the Defence Staff (Military Strategy & Operations) on 18 June 2018. He was appointed Companion of the Order of the Bath (CB) in the 2021 Birthday Honours. Chalmers was appointed to the ceremonial position as Colonel Commandant of the Queen's Division in November 2021, serving for three years until November 2024. He officially retired from the British Army on 19 February 2022.

== Later career ==
In February 2021, it was announced that Chalmers would succeed Fiona Reynolds as Master of Emmanuel College, Cambridge. He took up the post on 1 October 2021.

Following a pre-appointment hearing with the Public Administration and Constitutional Affairs Select Committee, he was announced as the next chair of the Committee on Standards in Public Life. He succeeded Lord Evans of Weardale as chair on 12 December 2023, to serve for a five-year term.

Military offices
Preceded by Mark Carleton-Smith	Deputy Chief of the Defence Staff (Military Strategy and Operations); 2018–2021	Succeeded by Roland Walker
Academic offices
Preceded by Fiona Reynolds	Master of Emmanuel College, Cambridge; 2021 to present	Incumbent
