= Thomas William Ward (industrialist) =

British scrap merchant and shipbreaker

Thomas Ward JP
- Born: Thomas William Ward; June 1853; Sheffield, England
- Died: 3 February 1926 (aged 72); Sheffield, England
- Burial place: Crookes Cemetery, Sheffield, England
- Occupations: Scrap metal merchant; Shipbreaker
- Spouse: Mary Sophia Ward
- Children: Thomas Leonard (1891-1960); Ethel Mary Bassett (1894-1986); Gertrude Miller (1895-1989); Alan Bassett (1897-1979); Frank Joseph (1899-1948)
- Parents: Thomas William Ward (father); Harriet Ward (mother)
- Relatives: Arthur Ward (brother); Joseph Ward (brother); George Bassett (grand-uncle)

Thomas William Ward JP (June 1853 – 3 February 1926) was a British scrap metal merchant and shipbreaker from Sheffield, England, most famous for the establishment of his company Thos. W. Ward Limited (Company No. 81020), and its First World War-era "employee" Lizzie the Elephant.

== Life ==
Ward was born in Sheffield, England in 1853, and began work as at the age of 15 as a coal merchant. He was soon drawn into Sheffield's famous steel industry and became a successful scrap metal dealer in the city, helped by the great demand for the product during the early 1870s. Ward became an expert at dismantling big structures, and rose to considerable fame as a skilled shipbreaker and tradesman with his company Thos. W. Ward Ltd, established in 1873 and formed into a Limited Company at the Albion Works in Sheffield in 1904. He owned breakers' yards at ports around Britain, and was well known for his resourceful nature, recycling everything on the warships and redundant luxury liners given over to his care, down to lamps and carpets, even the timber being used for garden furniture. Some of his most famous shipbreaking projects included the SS Majestic (1890) White Star Liner from the early 1900s, which was broken up at his yard near Morecambe in 1914 and the Olympic, which was finally towed to Inverkeithing. He was elected to the prestigious office of Master Cutler in 1913 and his brother Joseph became Chairman of the Scrap Advisory Committee to the Ministry of Munitions.

He was married to Mary Sophia Ward (1863–1955) and together they had three sons and two daughters including Ethel Mary Bassett Haythornthwaite (1894-1986).

== Death ==
Ward died on 3 February 1926, aged 73, and was buried at Crookes Cemetery, Headland Road, Sheffield along with his wife, two daughters and son-in-law, Gerald Haythornthwaite.

== Legacy ==
After Ward's death, Thos. W. Ward Ltd was able to survive throughout the Second World War and was run by Ward's family until the latter part of the 1950s. In January 1982 the company was taken over by Rio Tinto Zinc.

=== Restoration of graves ===
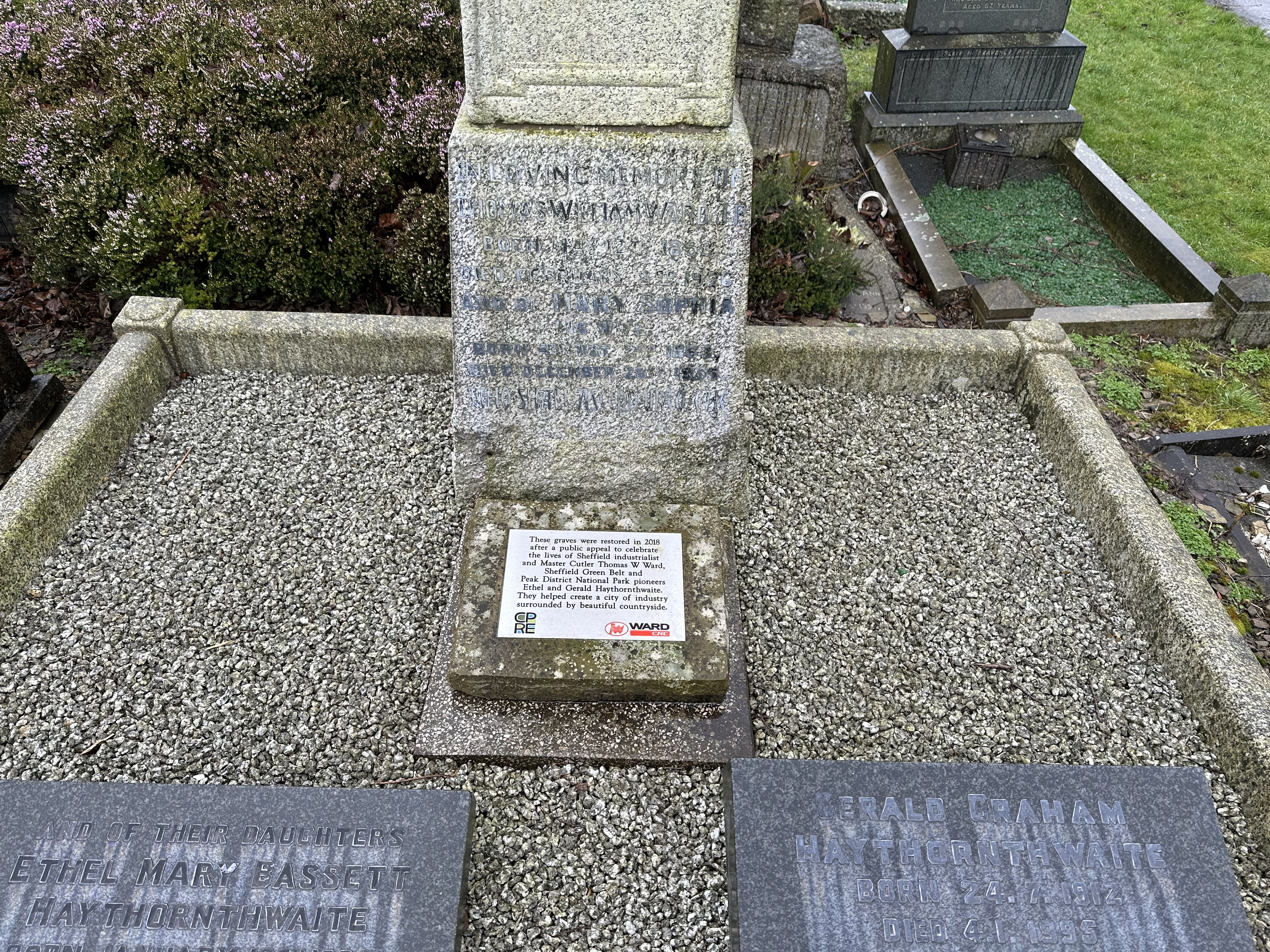
Graves of Ward and Haythornthwaite restored in 2018 with achievements plaque

In February 2016, a local resident reported that he found the graves of two of Sheffield's most generous philanthropists were neglected. Following a public appeal in 2018, the graves of Ward and Haythornthwaite (his daughter and her husband) were restored. A new plaque and monument at the site marks this event and explicitly acknowledges some of the achievements of Ward.

== See also ==
- List of people from Sheffield
- Lizzie the Elephant
