= Pete McKee =

British artist

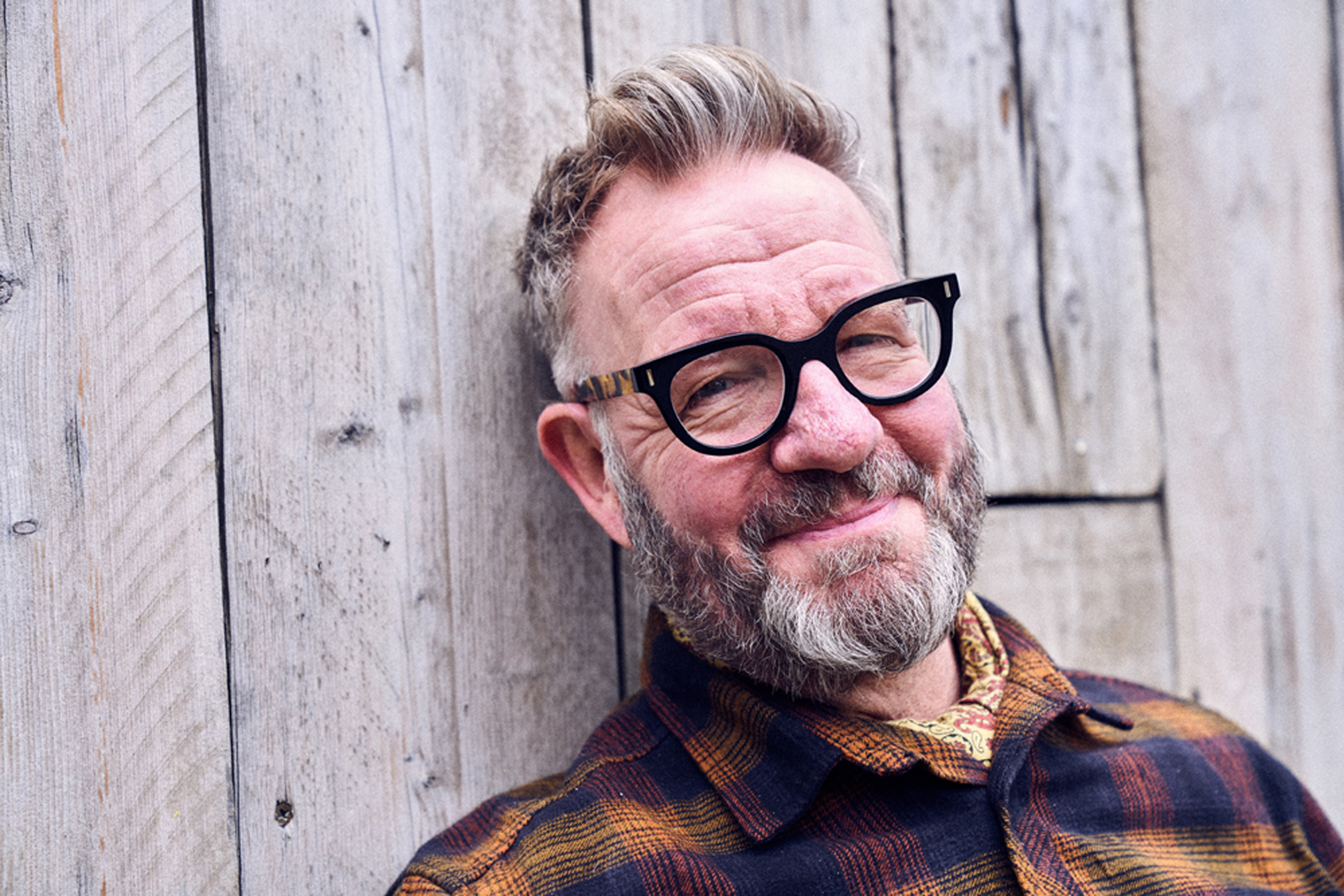
- Pete McKee taken in 2019 by Andy Willshire
- Born: Peter Robert McKee; 1 February 1966 (age 60); Sheffield, England
- Known for: Painting, cartoons
- Awards: Honorary Doctorate of The Arts
- Patrons: Noel Gallagher
- Website: https://www.petemckee.com/

Pete McKee (born 1 February 1966) is a painter and commercial artist from Sheffield, England. He is a cartoonist for the Sheffield Telegraph's sports section. He has exhibited regularly around the North of England. Using bright colours, he depicts characters inhabiting a world of working men's clubs, bingo halls and family trips to the seaside. Football is also heavily featured in his work although he regularly depicts fans from both halves of the footballing divide in Sheffield: Sheffield United and Sheffield Wednesday, the team he himself supports.

== Biography ==
Peter Robert McKee was born on 1 February 1966 in Sheffield to steelworker Frank McKee and Marjorie McKee (née Bullas). He grew up on a council estate in the Batemoor area of the city with two older brothers and one elder sister. His mother died of cancer when he was eight years old.

Educated at Rowlinson Comprehensive School, McKee aspired to attend art college, but he ended up working in a factory. He was able to find a creative outlet through music, and by designing logos and similar pieces of art. During that time, his primary goal was to find a record producer, and he continues to pursue that goal today. He currently plays in a ukulele band named The Everly Pregnant Brothers.

McKee began his career as a published artist by sending drawings to a Sheffield Wednesday fanzine. They offered him £50 which encouraged him to start drawing for the Sheffield Telegraph. In 2004, McKee decided to concentrate on his painting, with a focus on emulsion on MDF boards.

In 2007, McKee opened his first London show, entitled 'Lost Weekends'. He has also exhibited in Birmingham and New York City since then and was commissioned by Acme Studios to interpret characters from U.S. TV shows, including The Simpsons, Family Guy and Futurama.

In the same year, McKee was also commissioned by Oasis guitarist Noel Gallagher to paint him as part of Gibson Guitar's "Guitar Town" show. McKee produced a portrait of the guitarist on a 10-foot fibreglass guitar which was displayed as part of the open air exhibition on London's South Bank. In 2009, he created artwork for the Arctic Monkeys boxed set At the Apollo.

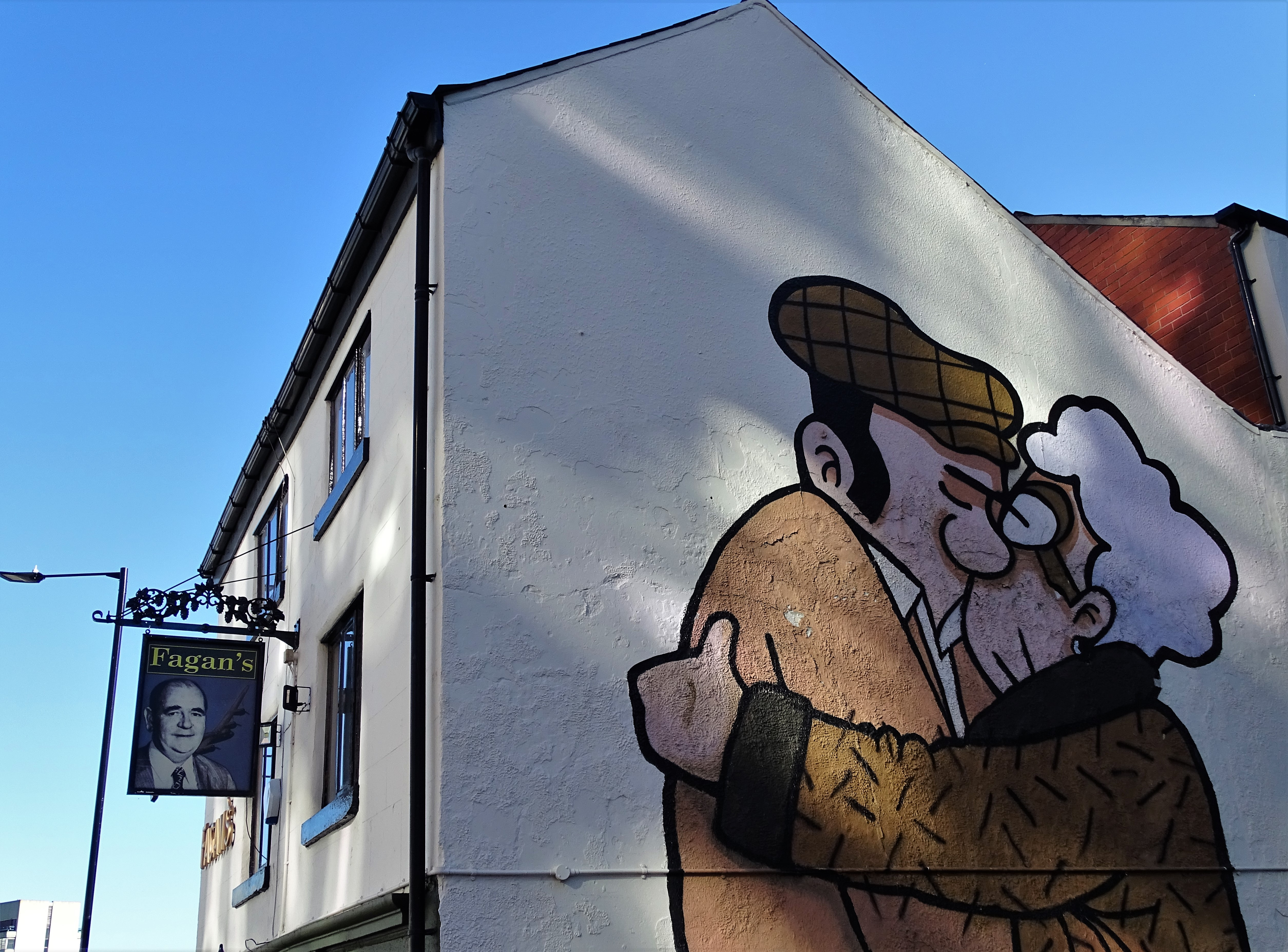
"The Snog" by Pete McKee on Broad Lane, Sheffield.

In early 2010, McKee was invited to design a limited edition pair of Clarks Desert Boots, using the original style template. To celebrate the heritage of the original boot he created images featuring a group of Mods, for the men's boot, and Modettes for the women's. The boots were sold in selected Clarks stores, specifically in Paris, New York and Japan.

Later in 2010, McKee collaborated with fashion designer Sir Paul Smith, staging an exhibition of his work at Smith's Tokyo store. This saw the development of Teenage Kicks – a limited edition book celebrating the influence of music on youth fashion. Selected images were reproduced on Paul Smith clothing and bags specifically for the Japanese market.

In June 2010, McKee opened a dedicated art gallery "A Month of Sundays" on Sharrow Vale Road in Hunters Bar, Sheffield. After a number of years, the shop was renamed Pete Mckee.

About two years later, in 2012, McKee was invited to take part in a special project from Warp Films to celebrate its tenth birthday. McKee was asked to re-create ten posters from ten of their iconic films, including Dead Man's Shoes, Submarine and This is England.

More recently, he has also painted several murals around Sheffield.

In 2016, McKee was asked to design a limited edition record player with British manufacturer Rega for Record Store Day. Five hundred of these Club Rega turntables were created.

In 2018, his collaborative show, 'THIS CLASS WORKS', sold out, with more than 10,000 visitors coming to this exhibition. In the same year, he also received an honorary doctorate from Sheffield Hallam University.

In the Summer of 2019, McKee decided to tour a collection of classic McKee artworks to three new cities: Brighton, Birmingham, and Nottingham. The pop-ups only lasted for a few days with thousands of visitors at each. There were three posters created to represent each city and he also held book signings and 'in conversation' events to sold-out crowds at each location.

Between 2021 and 2023, McKee was asked by singer and musician Rhoda Dakar to create the cover artwork for her album Version Girl and the single releases that accompanied it. Seven covers have been created all featuring Rhoda herself and were released by Sunday Best Records.

McKee has been an ambassador for Teenage Cancer Trust for more than a decade. He was introduced to the charity by Noel Gallagher after creating a gig poster for a performance by Noel at the Royal Albert Hall. For the last 10 years, McKee has collaborated with The Who, Paul Weller, Nile Rogers, New Order, Ed Sheeran, Pet Shop Boys, Madness, and many others on gig posters for their performances at the iconic venue. Each edition is signed and numbered by the artists performing as well as by McKee and sold to raise money for Teenage Cancer Trust. In addition to this, a Song Book was created to include all these lyrics and accompanying images.

In the autumn of 2023, McKee opened his new exhibition celebrating the life and love of two of his most popular characters Frank & Joy. Their story was told through the imagined pub The Buffer's Rest where all the important events in their lives unfolded. For this exhibition, McKee worked with set designers to build a pub within a warehouse in Sheffield. Visitors would enter the pub to view the couple's story within allocated time slots.

Speaking about the Frank and Joy pub exhibition, McKee stated:

Frank and Joy first came to life in 2013 when I created the mural "The Snog" to promote my Joy of Sheff exhibition. To be honest, though, they had inhabited my world from the very beginning:

I just hadn't give them names. But once I did, they took on their own life force and I felt compelled to explore their relationship. I fleshed out their story for a one-day art experience I curated called "Pub Scrawl", where ten artists were paired up with ten pubs and people were invited to go on an "art crawl" to see them all. Fagan's was my pub, and for my installation I chose to tell Frank and Joy's story and their relationship with the pub.

The story of Frank and Joy is also a story of the pub they frequented since they first met. I wanted to show how we as a community use our pubs, how they fulfil such an important role. Just like in times past we might have gathered round a stone circle, the pub, like a meeting hut or a church, is a place to congregate, to reflect, to celebrate.

In Summer 2024, McKee will move his longstanding gallery to the new Leah's Yard development in Sheffield City Centre.

== Exhibitions ==
- Urban Legends (November 2004)
- A Month of Sundays (January 2005)
- The Boy with a Leg Named Brian (October 2005)
- Northern Soul (November 2005)
- Jumpers for Goalposts (July 2006)
- Wish you were here (June 2006)
- Loneliness of a Fat Distance Runner (October 2006)
- Lost Weekends (November 2006)
- A Month of Sundays (June 2007)
- 33 1/3 (April 2008)
- 22 Views of Sheffield (November 2008)
- Snooker City - Sheffield (April 2009)
- Great Moments in Music History - Manchester (October 2009)
- Teenage Kicks - Tokyo (April 2010)
- A Month of Sundays - Scarborough (March 2011)
- The McKee Collection - The Biscuit Factory Newcastle (March - June 2011)
- Great Moments in Popular Music - SNAP Galleries London (September 2011)
- The Joy of Sheff - Blue Shed Sheffield (May 2013)
- Thud, Crackle, Pop - London (May 2014)
- 6 Weeks to Eternity - Magna Rotherham (May 2016)
- Marjorie - Herd of Sheffield (July - October 2016)
- This Class Works - 92 Burton Rd Sheffield (July 2018)
- Don't Adjust Your Mindset - Hoxton Arches London (April 2022)
- Don't Adjust Your Mindset - Millennium Gallery Sheffield
- Frank & Joy a Love Story - Trafalgar Warehouse Sheffield
