= Stainless Stephen =

British comedian

- Portrayed on a 1935 WD & HO Wills cigarette card.
- Born: Arthur Clifford Baynes; 30 November 1892; Sheffield, Yorkshire, England
- Died: 13 January 1971 (aged 78); Chiddingstone, Kent, England
- Occupations: Music hall entertainer, radio entertainer

Arthur Clifford Baynes (30 November 1892 – 13 January 1971) was an English teacher and comedian who performed under the stage name Stainless Stephen.

== Biography ==
Born in the steel-making city of Sheffield, Yorkshire, Baynes was a racing cyclist when young and continued to have an interest in cycling throughout his life; his cycle racing medals were later placed on public display in Sheffield Museum.

He served in the Sheffield City Battalion of the York and Lancaster Regiment during the First World War, and was wounded twice. After demobilisation, he made his first stage appearance as a comedian at the Palace in Luton in 1921. The following year, he joined Crookes Endowed School as an English teacher, and started appearing on local radio shows. He was one of the first comedians to appear on BBC Radio, where he created several characters including "Oscillating Oscar" as well as "Stainless Stephen".

He made his first London appearance on stage at the Victoria Palace in 1930. In 1932, he was voted the most popular radio artist in a newspaper poll, and appeared in Radio Parade (1933), a film of then-current performers. He gave up his teaching job in 1935 and moved to London as a full-time entertainer. On stage, he would appear dressed in a smart tuxedo, a bowler hat with a steel band around it, a rotating bow tie, and a stainless steel vest.

He retained a scholarly or "egg-headed" air, and became famous for his way of speaking punctuation marks, or irrelevancies, during his intoned monologues, instead of using them. He is said to have based the idea during a radio course he took while on military service. One example is:

"Somebody once said, inverted commas, comedians are born not made, full stop. Well, slight pause to heighten dramatic effect, let me tell my dense public innuendo that I was born of honest but disappointed parents in anno domini eighteen ninety something, full stop. Owing to my female fan following, the final two digits must be left to the imagination, end of paragraph and fresh line."

Closing a broadcast on 22 March 1941, he said: "And so, countrymen, semi-colon, all shoulders to the wheel, semi-quaver, we'll carry on till we get the Axis semi-circle, and Hitler asks us for a full stop!"

Never quite in the front rank of British music hall comedians, according to historian Roy Busby: "His topical comedy and inverted punctuation was known to irritate as well as amuse". He made several tours for ENSA during the Second World War, supported Will Hay at the Victoria Palace in 1944, and appeared on the bill at the London Palladium's Royal Command Performance in 1945.

He retired in 1952. As a postscript to his career Stainless Stephen appeared as a guest on Frost on Saturday on ITV on 15 November 1969. This edition was dedicated to the history of British Broadcasting to mark the first evening of colour transmissions on ITV. In the show the comedian gave the television audience a sample of his somewhat unusual comedy routine. This programme survives intact in the ITV archives.

He later ran a farm with his son at Chiddingstone, Kent, and died there in 1971, at the age of 78.
