= Fiona Reynolds =

British civil servant and academic administrator

Dame Fiona Reynolds DBE

Master of Emmanuel College, Cambridge
- In office October 2012 – 30 September 2021
- Preceded by: Lord Wilson of Dinton
- Succeeded by: Douglas Chalmers

Director General of the National Trust
- In office 2001 – 11 November 2012
- Chairman: Sir Simon Jenkins
- Succeeded by: Dame Helen Ghosh

Personal details
- Born: Fiona Claire Reynolds; 29 March 1958 (age 68) Alston, Cumbria, England, United Kingdom
- Education: Newnham College, Cambridge

Dame Fiona Claire Reynolds DBE (born 29 March 1958) is a British former civil servant and chair of the National Audit Office. She was previously master of Emmanuel College, Cambridge and director-general of the National Trust. Since January 2022 and as of September 2024 she is chair of the governing council at the Royal Agricultural University in Cirencester.

== Early life and education ==
Fiona Claire Reynolds was born on 29 March 1958 in Alston, Cumbria, England.

From 1969 to 1976, she was educated at Rugby High School for Girls, an all-girls grammar school in Rugby, Warwickshire.

She studied geography and land economy at Newnham College, Cambridge. She graduated from the University of Cambridge with a first class Bachelor of Arts (BA) degree in 1979; as per tradition, her BA was later promoted to a Master of Arts (MA Cantab) degree. From 1980 to 1981, she undertook postgraduate study at the University of Cambridge. She graduated with a Master of Philosophy (MPhil) degree in land economy; a Cambridge MPhil is equivalent to a taught Master of Arts degree from non-ancient universities.

== Career ==
Reynolds' first job was at the Council for National Parks (later Campaign for National Parks). Moving to the Campaign for Rural England, she held various positions before being appointed CEO there.

She joined the Cabinet Office as director of the Women's Unit in 1998.

She became director general of the National Trust in 2001. During her tenure, membership of the charity, which looks after 612,000 acres (2,480 km^{2}) of land in the United Kingdom, grew from 2.7 to 4 million people. In February 2010 she was a guest on Private Passions, the biographical music discussion programme on BBC Radio 3. Her appearance on the Chris Evans Breakfast Show on 18 February 2010 added momentum to the campaign to "save" Abbey Road studios.

It was announced in March 2012 that Reynolds would be stepping down as director-general of the National Trust to become the next Master of Emmanuel College, Cambridge, in succession to Lord Wilson of Dinton. She was admitted to her new post in October 2012, although was granted a leave of absence until October 2013.

In July 2020, the government announced that Reynolds had been appointed as the next chair of the National Audit Office (United Kingdom), a position she took up in January 2021. She was succeeded as Master of Emmanuel College by Douglas Chalmers in October 2021.

In January 2022 Reynolds became chair of governing council at the Royal Agricultural University in Cirencester, after having served as vice-chair since March 2021. She remains in the position as of March 2026.

== Other activities ==
Reynolds is a Companion of the Guild of St George.

She became a non-executive director of the BBC in January 2012 and Senior Independent Director in December 2012. She also joined the board of Wessex Water as a non-executive director in August 2012.

Reynolds was chair of the judging panel for the Wainwright Prize for nature writing in 2016, and in the same year succeeded Julia Bradbury as president of the Friends of the Peak District.

In 2017 published her book, The Fight for Beauty: Our Path to a Better Future.

She was High Sheriff of Gloucestershire for 2026.

== Recognition ==
In 1998, Reynolds was made a Commander of the British Empire (CBE).

Reynolds was appointed Dame Commander of the Order of the British Empire (DBE) in the 2008 New Year Honours for "services to heritage and conservation".

She was awarded the degree of Honorary Doctor of Science by the University of Warwick in January 2013.

In 2019 she was awarded the Royal Geographical Society's Patron's Medal "for her contribution to environmental protection, conservation and the preservation of the British landscape".

In July 2022, Reynolds received an Honorary Doctorate of Science from Royal Holloway, University of London, "for her achievements in the voluntary and public sectors, her leadership in higher education and her passionate advocacy for landscape, conservation and historical geography".

Academic offices
Preceded by Richard Wilson, Baron Wilson of Dinton	Master of Emmanuel College, Cambridge; October 2012–September 2021	Succeeded by Douglas Chalmers
