= George Bassett =

British politician

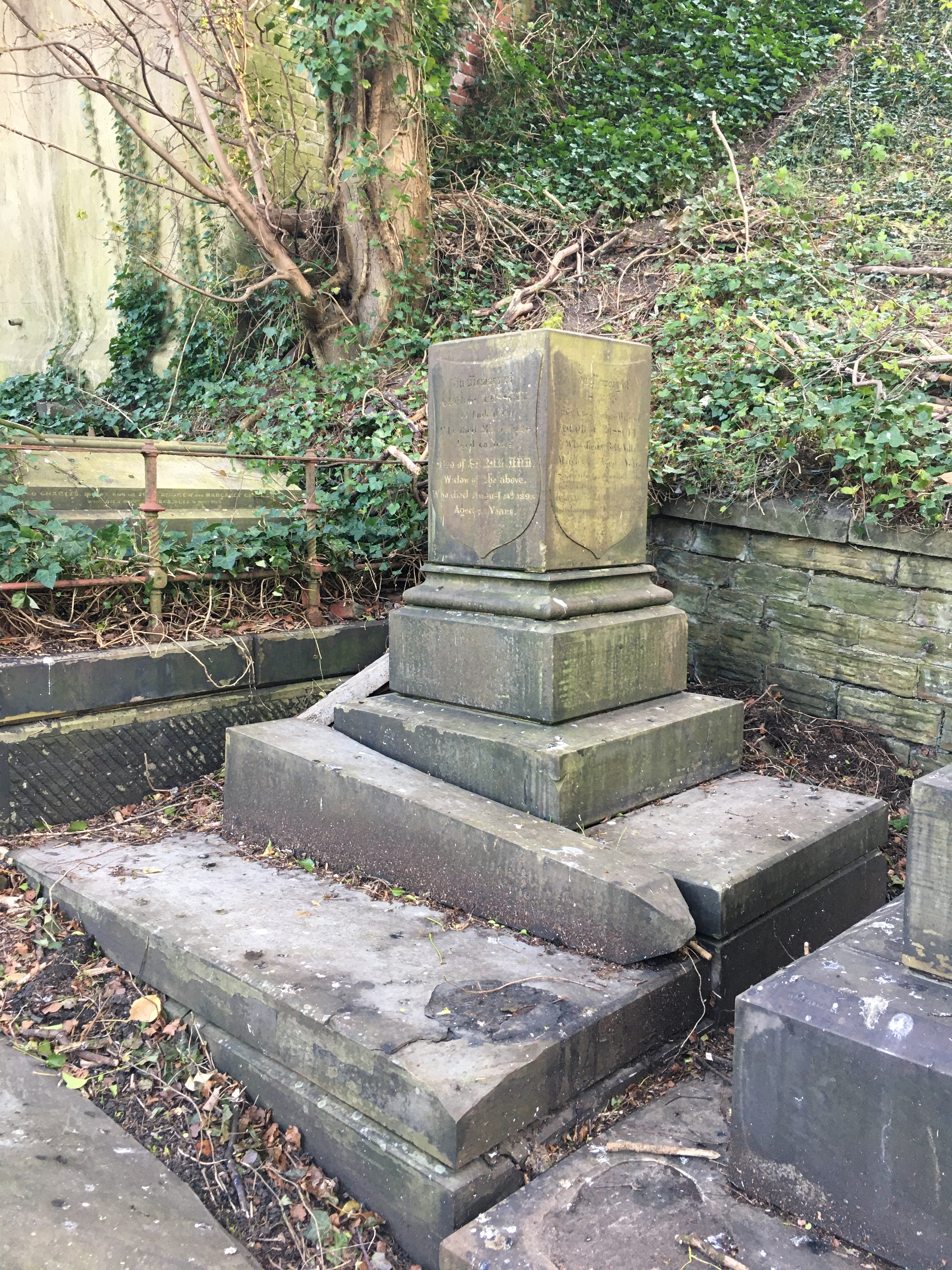
George Bassett's memorial in Sheffield General Cemetery

George Bassett (c. 1818–1886) was the founder in 1842 of Bassett's, a confectionery firm in Sheffield. The company (after his death) introduced Liquorice allsorts. He went on to become Mayor of Sheffield (1876). Whilst Mayor, he had US President Ulysses S. Grant as a house guest. He was born in Ashover, Derbyshire, and married as his first wife, Sarah Hodgson, they had six daughters. He married as his second wife, Sarah Ann Hague: they had two sons. He is buried in Sheffield General Cemetery with his second wife, Sarah Ann.

Bassett was the great-uncle of noted conservationist and countryside campaigner Ethel Haythornthwaite (1894–1986).
