= Henry Boot =

English builder and businessman

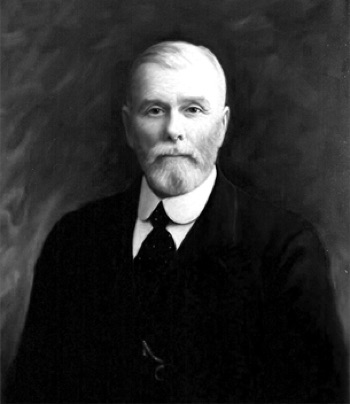
- Born: 9 December 1851
- Died: 2 November 1931 (aged 79)
- Burial place: Crookes Cemetery
- Known for: Founding Henry Boot plc

Henry Boot (1851–1931) was an English businessman who was the founder of Henry Boot plc.

== Personal life ==
Henry Boot was the eldest surviving son of Charles and Ann Boot. He was born on 9 December 1851 in Heeley, a small village two miles (3.2 km) outside Sheffield, England. Henry's father had described himself as a stonemason in the 1851 census but as a farmer when the children were baptized. In the 1871 census, 19-year-old Henry is living with his parents and is shown as a joiner's apprentice. The next year, he married Hannah White (1855–1941) and moved to Napier Street, Sheffield, sandwiched between the Anglican Church and the Plymouth Brethren meeting hall. Having first worshiped at the Church, he moved to the Brethren and later formed his own Brethren meeting. Henry and Hannah had 13 children over 20 years, ten of whom survived to adulthood.

== Career ==
Henry worked as an employee in the building industry for around 20 years before establishing his own joinery shop in 1886. The censuses record his increased status: in 1891, a joiner; in 1901, a builder and joiner; and in 1911, a joiner, builder, and contractor. His accommodation kept pace as well, with successive moves to larger houses: by 1911, he was living in an eleven-room house in Sheffield. His firm, Henry Boot plc, became an increasingly important contractor, but the driving force was Henry's eldest son, Charles Boot. By the start of World War I, Henry had retired from the company. He died on 2 November 1931 at his home on Victoria Road in Broomhall, aged 80. His grave is in Crookes Cemetery in Sheffield.
