= Walter Palmer (activist) =

American activist (born 1934)

Walter D. Palmer
- Born: October 7, 1934; Atlantic City, New Jersey
- Occupation: Academic
- Known for: Civil rights activism

Walter Palmer (born 1934) is an American academic and civil rights activist. Born in Atlantic City, Palmer moved to Philadelphia at seven years old and grew up in the Black Bottom, a predominantly black neighborhood in West Philadelphia. He would later protest its destruction during urban renewal. Palmer has taught at the University of Pennsylvania since 1990, and founded the Walter D. Palmer charter school in 2000, which closed in 2014.

== Biography ==
=== Early life and activism ===
Walter Palmer was born in 1934 in Atlantic City, New Jersey. He moved to Philadelphia's Black Bottom neighborhood when he was seven years old. His family lived in a two-story house on Market Street. Palmer described the Black Bottom as a tough yet strong and protective community.

Palmer was active in the coalition of residents, students, and civil rights activists who protested the plan to bulldoze large sections of the Black Bottom neighborhood as part of a federal urban renewal plan. The University of Pennsylvania, where Palmer would later teach, was a proponent of the plan. Palmer advocated for media coverage against the demolition, but was unsuccessful.

Palmer later established the Black Bottom Community Association in 1976 to preserve the neighborhood's history.

=== Academic and education career ===
Palmer has taught at the University of Pennsylvania since 1990.

Palmer became an activist in the school choice movement in Pennsylvania in the 1980s and 1990s, and later founded the Walter D. Palmer School in 2000. The charter school closed abruptly in 2014, after accepting almost double the number of students stipulated in an agreement signed in 2005. Palmer later became the head of Khepera Charter School, an African-centered charter school in North Philadelphia, in 2016.

The 3600 block of Market Street, where Palmer grew up, was renamed in his honor in 2026.
