= Henry Boot plc =

British property development business

- Formerly: Henry Boot & Sons Public Limited Company (1919–1999)
- Type: Public
- Traded as: LSE: BHY
- Industry: Construction; Land and Property
- Founded: 1886
- Headquarters: Sheffield, England, UK
- Key people: Peter Mawson (Chairman); Tim Roberts (CEO)
- Revenue: ▼£251.5 million (2025)
- Operating income: ▼£30.5 million (2025)
- Net income: ▼£20.5 million (2025)
- Website: henryboot.co.uk

Henry Boot plc is a British property development business based in Sheffield, England. It was floated on the London Stock Exchange in 1919, becoming the first quoted housebuilder. Between the wars, Henry Boot built more houses (public and private) than any other company. The company remains a significant construction and property management company operating in the UK.

== History ==
=== Origins ===
Henry Boot (1851–1931) was born a farmer's son in the small village of Heeley just outside Sheffield. Henry served a seven-year apprenticeship and worked a total of 20 years with local building firms before he began to work on his own account in 1886. The new business rapidly progressed from jobbing work to larger scale public contracts and housing projects. Henry's eldest son Charles Boot (1874–1945) joined the business after leaving school (presumably not long after the business started) and it was he who transformed Henry Boot & Sons into one of the most successful construction and housing businesses between the wars.

Henry had retired from the business and Charles had been appointed as its managing director prior to the outbreak of the First World War. As with so many construction businesses, war expanded the range of contracts: Henry Boot & Sons built the British Army camp at Catterick in Yorkshire; RAF Manston Aerodrome near Ramsgate; the Calshot Naval Air Station at Calshot in Hampshire; Tees Naval Base; a U.S. Army Rest Camp and hospital at Southampton and Chepstow Military Hospital. The company also constructed over one thousand military buildings and over 50 miles of roads and sewers.

=== Interwar period ===
Charles was keenly interested in housing and, as soon as hostilities ended, he began what became a major housebuilding programme – both public and private. The company was floated at the end of 1919 to raise £300,000 of new capital to finance these plans. The prospectus stated that the company was operating out of London and Birmingham as well as Sheffield, and it recorded that "Provisional arrangements have been made to proceed at once with several large housing contracts involving the building of some thousands of houses". In the 1920s, housing construction was primarily undertaken for local authorities; at the end of the decade Company accounts stated that some 20,000 houses had been built for local authorities. During the 1930s, the emphasis swung to private development and Henry Boot became a substantial developer of housing estates, both for sale and rent. In 1933, First National Trust was formed specifically to develop and administer estates to be let at low rents.

At the beginning of 1935, the Company raised a further £400,000 of preference capital to finance expansion. The Prospectus stated that the company had built around 30,000 houses since 1920. There is some uncertainty as to how many houses were built during the inter-war period. The company's "Brief History" at one point mentioned 80,000, but Charles himself referred on separate occasions to lower figures. In 1943 “I have been engaged in building for over fifty years, and my concerns have... built over 60,000 houses; and in 1944 "as a builder of over fifty thousand houses". The 60,000 figure is thought to be the most appropriate. The homes became known as Boot houses; many of them were suffering from carbonatation by the 1980s.

The company's massive housebuilding programme was not to the exclusion of the traditional general construction business. A Paris office was opened immediately after the conclusion of the First World War I and Boot was engaged in the reconstruction of war-damaged towns. During 1920, offices were opened in Athens and Barcelona. One of the largest contracts of its time was a £10m Greek irrigation contract, awarded in 1927; however, the 1935 Minute Book recorded that ledgers had not been received from Greece and the contract was not finished until 1952. The wide range of construction projects carried out by Boot in the UK and in Europe included harbours, railways, roads, schools and hospitals; however, the scheme for which Boot typically is best known is Pinewood Studios, work on which started in 1935.

=== 1939–1989 ===
The outbreak of the Second World War led to the company quickly ceasing its housing construction work so that its resources could be concentrated on Britain's wartime requirements. By the end of 1939, it had already commenced work for all three services; Boot's wartime projects included aerodromes, ordnance factories and hospital camps. Boot was also one of the major contractors engaged in the construction of Mulberry harbour units.

Charles Boot died in 1945 and the company never again became the force it had been between the wars. In particular, housing output remained well below its pre-war levels as management lay in the control of family members that were more interested in construction: throughout the 1960s, Boot averaged no more than 200 houses per year. However, one feature that was unique to Boot was that in 1965 it formed its own building society – The Banner Building Society (Boot had moved its head office to Banner Cross Hall in Sheffield in 1932). Many of the houses that had been built by Boot in the 1930s had been financed with mortgages created by Boot itself and Boot transferred these mortgages into Banner; public deposits were gradually taken into Banner enabling Boot to progressively remove its own capital. This structure was not popular with the Registrar of Friendly Societies and Banner was eventually sold to Midshires Building Society in 1982.

Throughout the 1970s, Henry Boot strengthen its railway engineering business and significantly increase its overseas activities. The Company supplied all the trackwork for the Mass Transit Railway in Hong Kong; there were further contracts for the Kowloon-Canton Railway and in Singapore. However, in 1985, the group lost £7m, which was primarily incurred by its overseas construction work. During the following year, Jamie Boot (the grandson of Charles’ younger brother Edward) was appointed managing director. The emphasis of the group was changed: the traditional railway engineering business was sold in 1988 and private housing development gradually increased.

=== 1990-present ===
During May 1990, Henry Boot announced that it had recorded pre-tax profits to £5.36 million, a 37 per cent rise over the year prior; its performance, which had included a number of successful property deals, was above that of most larger British construction companies at that time. In the early 1990s, the company's housing activities were often less lucrative than its property development work. Outside of housing, its construction projects included the building of retail outlets, waterworks, and healthcare facilities.

In October 1993, Henry Boot was awarded a contract to upgrade the Brechin bypass to a dual carriageway under the first such design and build contract in Scotland. That same year, it merged its southern and northern divisions, forming Henry Boot Construction. During 1994, Jamie announced that the company would orientate itself more towards the building sector over that of civil engineering due to the poor margins being achieved within the latter market. In the following year, a loss was recorded, which management attributed to a combination of poor margins and late payments from its customers.

By 2001, the company's house sales had risen to 700 per year. Two years later, the company cited competing cash demands from the property and plant divisions as its reason for putting the housing division up for sale: it was sold to Wilson Bowden in exchange for £48m.

Following the start of the Great Recession, Henry Book recorded a £20m loss as, even though its revenue from various construction activities remained steady, it had been hit heavily by the devaluation of its property portfolio. Within one year, it had returned to profit as a result of several cuts made. During 2011, the firm repaid its debts and posed a profit. In the mid-2010s, Henry Boot benefited from rising construction tender prices and an improved planning system. In 2016, the company sought to expand the number of commercial schemes undertaken.

In the early 2020s, Henry Boot's activities were heavily impacted by the COVID-19 pandemic, leading to job losses and a restructuring effort; it had demonstrated a partial recovery by early 2022. Profits almost returned to pre-Covid levels by the end of that year, having been bolstered by land sales.

On 23 September 2025, Henry Boot PLC announced it had agreed to sell its contracting division, Henry Boot Construction. The transaction, executed via a management buyout, was completed on 31 December 2025. A newly formed purchasing vehicle, PWS Construction Limited, was established and led by three long-serving directors of the contracting division. Following the buyout, the entity rebranded as HBC Construction Group. To ensure business continuity during the transition, Henry Boot PLC provided temporary transitional support and oversight until the loan was settled. In its final full year under parent-company ownership (2024), Henry Boot Construction generated £49.7 million in revenue but reported an operating loss of £2.7 million.

== Operations ==
The Group is organised into the following divisions:

- Henry Boot Developments operates in the UK property development market.
- Hallam Land Management is the strategic land and planning promotion arm of the business.
- Henry Boot Construction serving both public and private clients in all construction sectors.
- Banner Plant Limited is a plant hire company.
- Stonebridge Homes Limited is a jointly owned housing business operating in the north of England.
- Road Link (A69) Limited operates a 30-year contract with the Highways Agency to maintain the A69 trunk road.

== Legal issues ==
During the mid 1990s, the company had a payment dispute with a subcontractor, which led to a brick supplier for one of Henry Boot's Manchester-based project withdrawing and facing a winding-up order. A mass claim headed by a London-based accountant on behalf of unpaid suppliers was launched against the company.

In the late 1990s, the firm sued GEC Alsthom over a claims dispute related to work on the Connah's Quay Power Station in North Wales.

Henry Boot Developments Ltd. developed a retail facility and petrol station at junction 11 on the M20 motorway, which was tenanted by Food Co UK LLP, trading as Muffin Break. Estimated usage was predicted by Henry Boot Developments at 80,000 visitors per week, which turned out to be an overly optimistic forecast. The tenant took Henry Boot Developments to court alleging fraudulent misrepresentation about the extent that motorway signage could be provided from the M20, about predicted visitor numbers, and about the scale of the facilities that could be offered. The court rejected Food Co UK's claims because Henry Boot Developments had made statements based on reasonable grounds.
