= Steve Circuit =

English footballer

Personal information
- Full name: Steven Circuit
- Date of birth: 11 April 1972 (age 54)
- Place of birth: Sheffield, England
- Position: Midfielder

Youth career
- Sheffield United

Senior career*
Years	Team	Apps	(Gls)
1990–1993	Sheffield United	0	(0)
1991	→ Fram Larvik (loan)		
1993	Stafford Rangers		
1993	Halifax Town	1	(0)
1993–1996	Boston United		
1996–1997	Macclesfield Town		
1997–1998	Gainsborough Trinity		
1998–1999	Leek Town	45	(1)
1999–2001	Gainsborough Trinity		
2001–2003	Alfreton Town		
2003–2008	Matlock Town		
- * Club domestic league appearances and goals

Steven Circuit (born 11 April 1972) is an English former professional footballer who played as a midfielder.

== Career ==
Circuit began his career as a trainee with Sheffield United. From 1 May to 1 October 1991 he was loaned to IF Fram Larvik in Norway, where he was regarded as a "disappointment".

He later moved to Stafford Rangers. He played a single game in the Football League for Halifax Town against Wrexham in 1993. He moved to Boston United where he remained for three seasons, before joining Macclesfield Town and being part of the team that won promotion to the Football League in 1997. He later had several spells with Gainsborough Trinity as well as playing for Leek Town, Alfreton Town. and Matlock Town.
