= CPU Records =

British record label

Central Processing Unit
- Founded: 2012
- Distributor(s): Kudos
- Genre: Electronic, Electro
- Country of origin: United Kingdom
- Official website: http://cpurecords.net/

Central Processing Unit, commonly referred to as CPU Records, is an independent British record label, founded in Sheffield in 2012 by Chris Smith, and notable for bridging contemporary electronic music with the early Sheffield Bleep era, and being at the forefront of contemporary electro music. Distributed by Kudos Records London UK. The label uses an 8 digit binary catalog number system for its releases, which means that it will only allow for a total of 256 releases. The label released its 100th release in August 2021 with a 12 inch record from Cygnus called 100% Dope. Many of the label's releases are mastered in Smith's Computer Club Sheffield studio. In 2019 the label launched their own studio filter module called The CPU Filter, modelled on the classic Roland Jupiter-6 filter. The label is also parent to the sub label Computer Club records which released electronic music from 2013 to 2018.
