= Walt Palmer =

English footballer

Personal information
- Full name: Walter Palmer
- Date of birth: 16 July 1907
- Place of birth: Attercliffe, England
- Date of death: 1985 (aged 77 or 78)
- Position: Centre forward

Senior career*
Years	Team	Apps	(Gls)
1931–1932	Leeds United	0	(0)
1932	Worksop Town	?	(?)
1932	Burnley	0	(0)
1932–1933	Southport	1	(0)
	Shelbourne	?	(?)
- * Club domestic league appearances and goals

Walter Palmer (16 July 1907 – 1985) was an English professional footballer who played as a centre forward. Although he was on the books of three clubs in the Football League, he only made one senior appearance, whilst playing for Southport who were in the Third Division (North) at the time.
