= Kings Tower, Sheffield =

Future residential skyscraper in Sheffield, England

Kings Tower
- An artists impression of Kings Tower viewed from Church Street
- Interactive map of the Kings Tower area

General information
- Status: Approved
- Type: Residential
- Location: Castle Square, 51–57 High Street, Sheffield City Centre
- Coordinates: 53.3834°N 1.4656°W
- Construction started: Summer 2022 (planned)
- Completed: 2023 (planned)
- Cost: £40 million (projected)

Height
- Roof: 120 m (390 ft)

Technical details
- Floor count: 40
- Lifts/elevators: 2

Design and construction
- Architect: Hodder + Partners
- Developer: SFGE Properties

Other information
- Public transit: B P Y TT Castle Square

Kings Tower is an approved skyscraper (Note: Under the Emporis Standards Committee, a skyscraper is defined as a multi-storey building which is at least 100 m (330 ft). Any building from 35 to 100 m (115 to 328 ft) tall is generally considered to be a high rise building.) that will be located on Castle Square at the junction of High Street and Angel Street in Sheffield, South Yorkshire. With a planned height of 120 m (390 ft) once completed, Kings Tower will overtake St Pauls Tower (current tallest building) as the tallest building in Sheffield and in Yorkshire. Plans for the tower were submitted by architects Hodder + Partners in September 2020, calling initially for a 39-storey tower. Planning permission was granted in December 2020, and construction is planned to complete in 2023. Amended plans were submitted in late 2022, adding a 40th floor to the project.

Kings Tower will be located in the Castlegate area of Sheffield City Centre, on a site bounded by High Street to the south, Angel Street to the west, King Street to the north and the EasyHotel building on Haymarket to the east. The area has undergone a wider redevelopment in the late 2010s and early 2020s as part of the Castlegate Grey to Green Scheme and the Castle Market redevelopment. The site is served by Castle Square tram stop on the Sheffield Supertram network.

== Site history ==
The site of Kings Tower is part of the Castlegate Quarter, the historic centre of Sheffield associated with the former Sheffield Castle at the confluence of the Rivers Sheaf and Don. Located up the hill from the castle, the site was occupied by a town marketplace established by Royal Charter as early as 1296. The existing market on the site was demolished and redeveloped as the Fitzalan Market in 1786, which was subsequently refurbished in 1855.

With the construction of Castle Hill Market (which would later become the redeveloped Castle Market) in 1930, Fitzalan Market was demolished and the site was replaced by a retail building which was completed in 1932. This was known as the Burton Building, as the ground floor retail space was occupied by Burton Menswear, while the upper floors contained a billiard room and a roller skating rink.

During World War II, the Burton Building was badly damaged by Luftwaffe air raids during the Sheffield Blitz of 1940. The badly damaged building remained derelict for over a decade, as the Sheffield Corporation could not afford funds for a replacement and, in later years, had drawn up plans to replace the site with a roundabout at the head of Arundel Gate. Plans for the roundabout were subsequently scaled down to form the smaller Hole in the Road scheme at Castle Square, and the site again became available for redevelopment. In 1962, the Burton Building was demolished and replaced by a Peter Robinson's department store.

The first branch of Topshop was opened in the third floor of the Robinson's Building in 1964. Peter Robinson's subsequently ceased trading in 1974, with the upper floors becoming a C&A store while the ground floor was occupied by a furniture store operated by Waring & Gillow. By the 1990s, these retailers had moved out and the entire building was occupied by Primark. Following the construction of their new-build store across the city centre on The Moor in 2016, Primark vacated the Robinson's Building and it once again became unoccupied.

== Design and planning ==
The design consists of a central 40-storey residential tower on the plot of land previously occupied by Primark in the Robinson's Building, which will be demolished to make way for the skyscraper. The adjacent Kings Buildings to the immediate east, currently occupied by an EasyHotel, will be retained and refurbished, with an area of the second floor of the building that is presently unoccupied being amalgamated into the Kings Tower residential scheme.

Kings Tower is planned to contain 206 residential apartments. There will be a provision for retail space on the ground floor. King Street will be refurbished, retaining its pedestrianised market stalls. Sitting in a prominent location in the city centre on the edge of Castle Square at the head of both Arundel Gate and the High Street, Kings Tower will feature a curved façade on these two sides featuring large windows separated by narrow fluted columns of Portland stone. The remainder of the building, including much of the lower floors, will be clad in white brick slips to match, accentuated with smaller, randomly placed windows. The overall scheme is forecast to cost £40 million.

== Construction ==
No formal start date for construction has yet been given, although a tentative start date of "summer 2022" and ending date of 2023 has been stated in planning documents. As of July 2026 work has not started.
