= Sheffield Central Library =

Library in Sheffield, South Yorkshire, England

Coordinates: 53.380°N 1.467°W

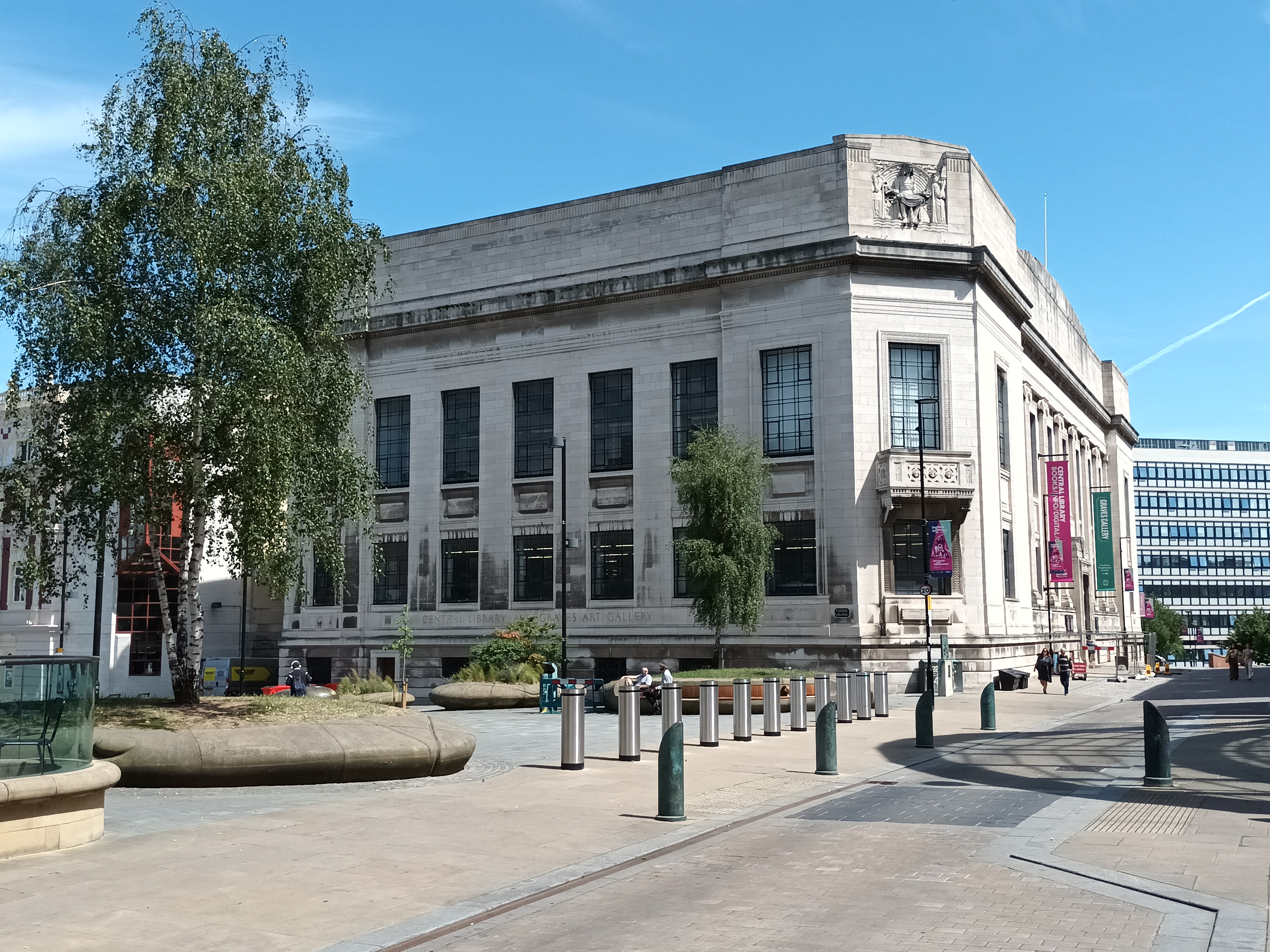
- Interactive map of the Sheffield Central Library area

General information
- Location: Sheffield, England
- Completed: 1934; 92 years ago
- Client: Sheffield City Council

Other information
- Public transit access: B P Y TT; Castle Square; Arundel Gate Interchange

Sheffield Central Library is a public library in Sheffield, South Yorkshire, England. It houses the city library service's single largest general lending and reference collection, as well as Graves Art Gallery, on the third floor, and a theatre in the basement.

Services available from the building include the Sheffield Information Service and a wide range of library sections, such as arts, sports, business, technology and local studies.

Work on the building began in 1929, to a design by W. G. Davies. Built in a broadly Art Deco style, it was opened in 1934 by the Duchess of York (later The Queen Mother). Conceived as part of a plan by Patrick Abercrombie to create a civic square, it was the only element of that proposal ever built and so it faces onto a narrow street. In 1991, Tudor Square was constructed to one side of the library.

The building, supported by a steel frame, is faced with Portland stone and has some decorative mouldings by Alfred and William Tory. It is a listed building at Grade II status.

The art gallery contained within was founded around a bequest from J. G. Graves and hosts a range of temporary and permanent exhibitions.

In January 2017, Private Eye reported that the building's owner, Sheffield City Council, planned to sell it due to expensive repairs being required following years of neglect. The potential buyer was the Sichuan Guodong Construction Group, a Chinese developer, which proposed to convert the library into a hotel. The company discovered its costs for the intended work would be higher than anticipated and the project was abandoned. The latest council commissioned report on proposals for the building indicate that the preferred option is for the library service to be moved to a new site with Castlegate or the former John Lewis building in Barkers Pool mentioned as possibilities. Under these plans, the current library building itself would be retained for just the Graves Gallery.
