= Fitzalan Square =

Square in Sheffield, South Yorkshire, England

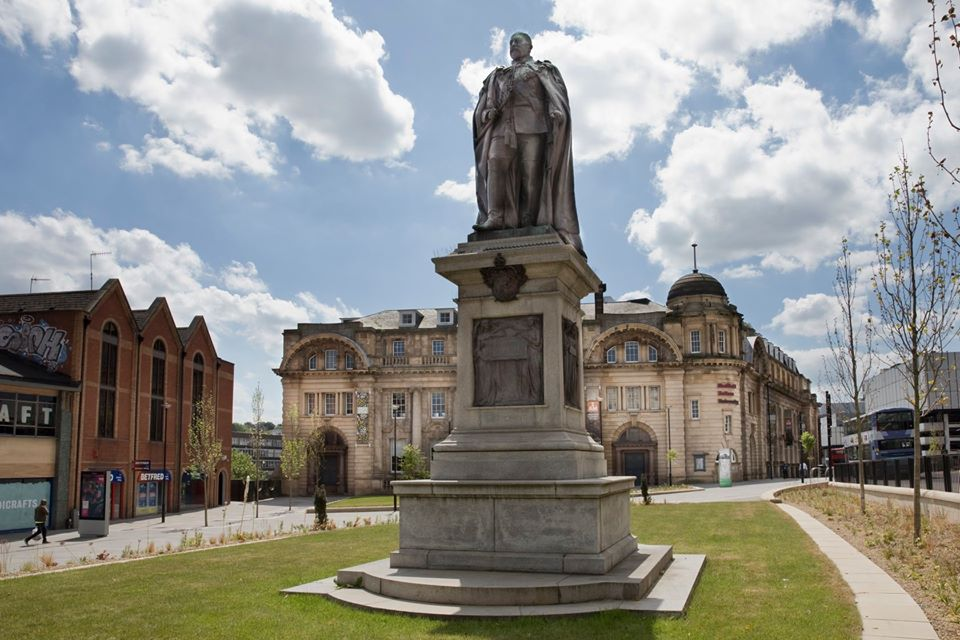
Fitzalan Square in June 2020, following renovations.

Fitzalan Square is a municipal square situated in the city centre of Sheffield in South Yorkshire, England. The present day square is one of the busiest areas of the city centre, with traffic and pedestrians continually moving through the area. It has a South Yorkshire Supertram stop and a taxi rank.

This area of the city had been the market quarter since the medieval era and the modern square takes its name from the Fitzalan Market Hall, which stood near the site from 1786 to 1930. The Fitzalans were a lesser branch of the Howard family, Dukes of Norfolk and the major local landowners at that time.

In 2017, Sheffield City Council announced plans to renovate the square.

== Location ==
The square is located in the city centre at 53°22′58″N 1°27′41″W; to the south of the eastern end of High Street. It is rectangular in shape, formed by the staggered intersections of Flat Street and Haymarket with High Street from the south and north respectively. Commercial Street and Bakers Hill leave the square to the east. Norfolk Street used to intersect with Flat Street at the south-western corner of the square, but it was cut off from the square when Arundel Gate was constructed in 1968.

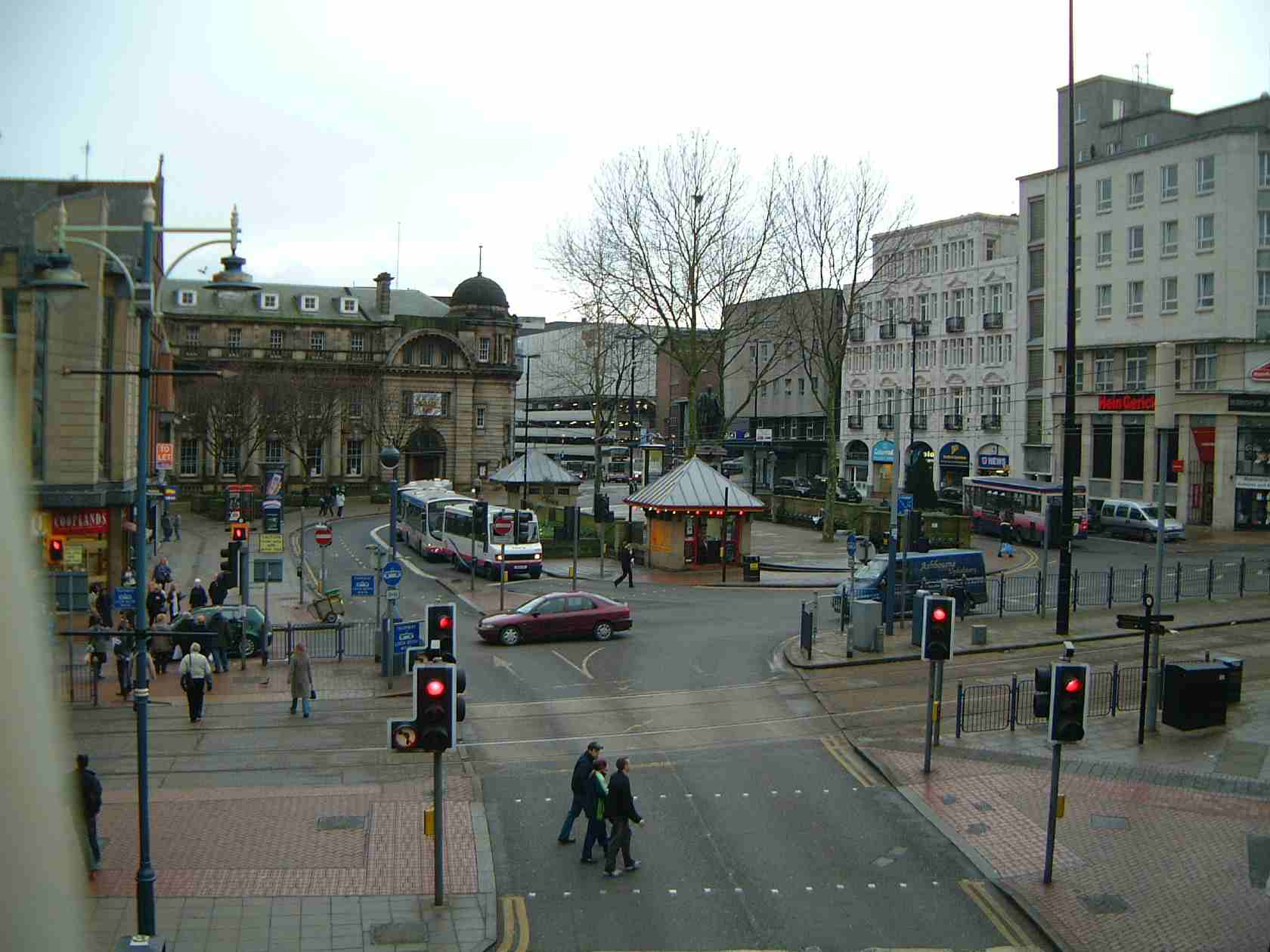
Fitzalan Square, in 2006 the Marples building is on the far right of the picture.

== History ==
Fitzalan Square was created in 1881 when Market Street and its buildings were demolished; the early square had a substantial cab stand and clock. However, this was demolished in 1913 to make way for a bronze statue of King Edward VII by Alfred Drury (1857–1944). This was unveiled by the Duke of Norfolk on 27 October 1913, and stands to this day.

Sheffield's Head Post Office operated in the square for almost ninety years. Built in 1910 as an addition to the 1897 post office building on Flat Street, it closed in 1999, with the main post office moving to new premises within the Co-op store on Angel Street. The Grade II listed Post Office building was up for sale for a considerable time before finally being sold for development in early 2006. On the west side of the square is the Grade II listed White Building. Built in 1908 by Gibbs and Flockton, it is faced in faience with carvings of the Sheffield metal trades by Alfred and William Tory, the faience was intended to resist the soot that blackened many of Sheffield's buildings at the time. The early square also had the Electra Palace Cinema, which opened in February 1911. It became the News Theatre in 1945 and the Classic Cinema in 1962. It closed in 1982, and the building was destroyed by a fire in 1984. The site is now occupied by an amusement arcade. Next door to the cinema was the Bell Hotel public house, which is now a gift shop. Another public house, the Elephant Inn, stood on the corner where Norfolk Street entered the square. This closed in the late 1960s; it later became a branch of Halfords and then a charity shop. The well known Sheffield company of Wigfalls also had a shop in the square for many years, this is now a betting shop. However, the best-known structure in Fitzalan Square is the “Marples” building.

=== The Marples tragedy ===
The building at the corner of the square as it joins High Street was first occupied by a hotel in 1870; John Marples became the proprietor in 1886 and named the establishment the London Mart however it was always known locally as “The Marples”.

On the night of Thursday 12 December 1940, 280 German bombers attacked Sheffield in what has become known as the Sheffield Blitz. Their target was the steel works producing armaments in the east end of the city, however a mistake in navigation caused the city centre to become the main target. Fire bombs caused widespread panic, and many people took shelter in the Marples’ extensive cellars, believing they were safe under the robust seven-storey building. At 11:44 p.m. the Marples building took a direct hit from a bomb which plunged through the building and detonated just above the cellars, killing approximately 70 people and reducing the building to a 15-foot-high (4.6 m) pile of rubble. The next day seven men were dug out of the rubble still alive, as a small section of cellar roof had, amazingly, withstood the impact.

The Marples site stood derelict until 1959 when the brewing company John Smith opened a new public house on the site, this time officially called “The Marples”. The pub closed in 2002 and was occupied by the Hein Gericke motorcycle clothing and accessory outlet until 2008. The building then stood empty for a few years but since 2012 the Marples building has been occupied by Cash Shop, a fair money lending and pawn broking company.

== Present day ==
Fitzalan Square received a facelift during the summer of 2003. The Edward VII statue was cleaned and protected from pigeons, and lights were added to illuminate it at night. New sandstone paving and steel benches were installed, the trees were pruned and the street lighting was improved. In addition to a fair money lending and pawn broking company, amusement arcade and gift shop, the square contains three betting shops from national chains Betfred, Coral and Ladbrokes, a few insurance companies and a small newsagents. In the inner part of the square there is also a fast food hut named @Marples and a small police cabin. In January 2016, the Sheffield Institute of Arts (the art and design department within Sheffield Hallam University) moved into a fully refurbished Head Post Office, at the start of an initial 20-year lease, housing graphic design, fine art, fashion and product design. It is believed the Council will be further updating and improving the central area/island within the Square, possibly closing off one side to traffic.

== Supertram stop ==
Fitzalan Square is a central station on the South Yorkshire Supertram in Sheffield, serving the Ponds Forge International Sports Centre. It is one of only three stations served by all four of the system's routes.

Preceding station	South Yorkshire Supertram	Following station
Castle Square towards Malin Bridge	Blue Route	Sheffield Station towards Halfway
Castle Square towards Cathedral	Purple Route	Sheffield Station towards Herdings Park
Castle Square towards Middlewood	Yellow Route	Hyde Park towards Meadowhall Interchange
Castle Square towards Cathedral	Tram-Train Route	Hyde Park towards Rotherham Parkgate
