= Canada House, Sheffield =

Building in Sheffield, South Yorkshire, England

Coordinates: 53.3832°N 1.4633°W

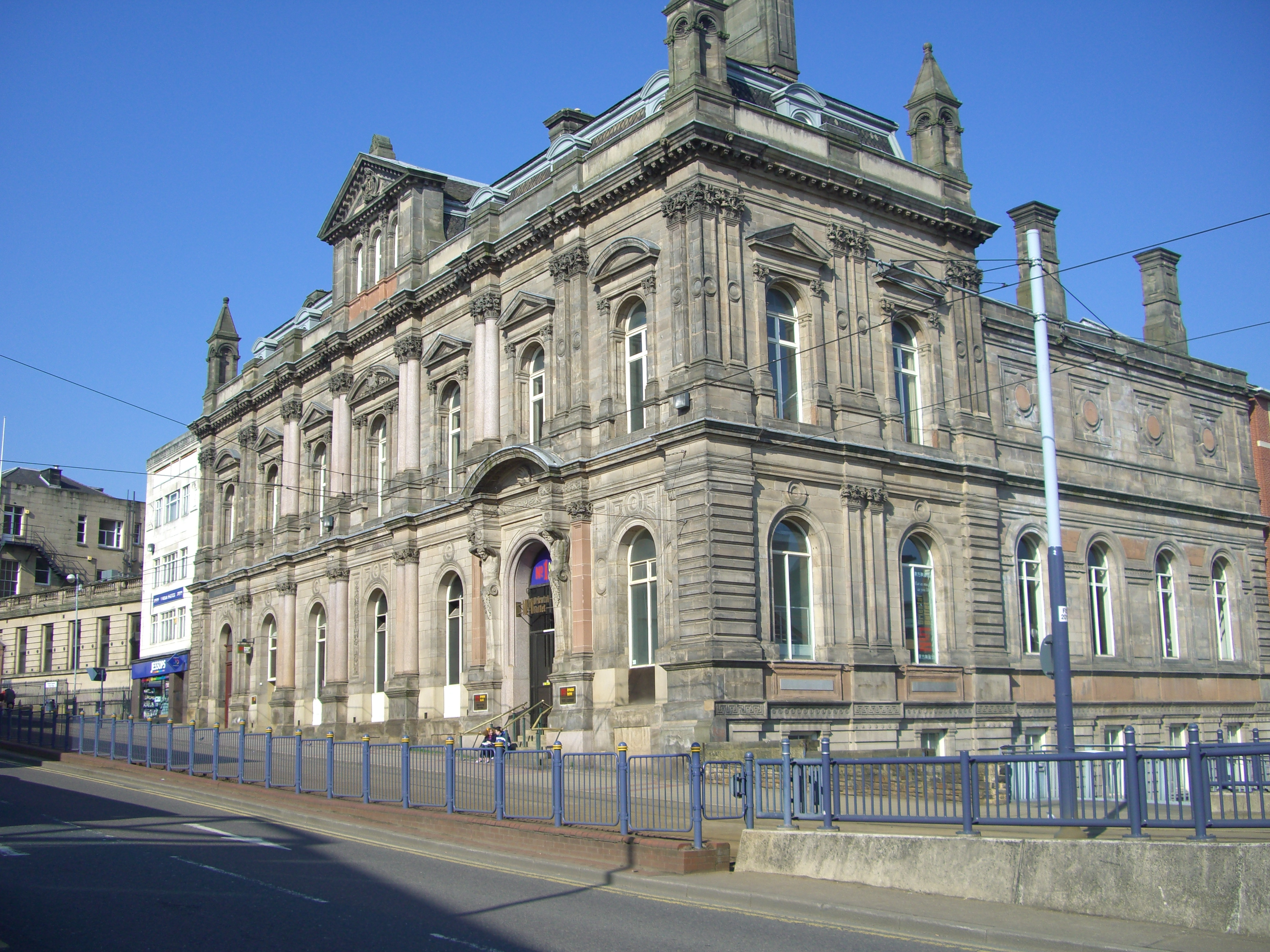

Canada House, formerly known as Panache House, is a Grade II* listed building situated on the northern side of Commercial Street in the centre of the city of Sheffield, South Yorkshire, England. It was built as the head offices of the Sheffield United Gas Light Company in 1874. While the main outlook of the building is out onto Commercial Street there is also a short frontage onto Shude Hill at its eastern end and this designated as 19 Shude Hill.

== History ==
The building was constructed for the Sheffield United Gas Light Company in 1874 by M.E. Hadfield & Son in the classical style of a grand Italian villa. It was originally named Panache House, and this designation remains carved above the main entrance. The interior contains ornate plaster ceilings and period fireplaces. The general office contains a glazed dome by J.F. Bentley and carvings by Thomas Earp while the board room contains a decorative ceiling by Hugh Stannus. Improvements and additions were made to the building in 1890. The building remained as offices for the Gas Board until 1972 and throughout this period it was informally known as the Gas Office. The vacant building was offered for sale in 1972 but no buyers came forward. Property developers sought consent to demolish the building and redevelop the site but this was opposed by several preservation societies and in June 1973 it was designated as a Grade II* listed building.

An inquiry into the building’s future in 1977 resulted in Sheffield’s Assistant Chief Planner David Cathels stating that the building was considered to be “A vigorous and distinguished example of Victorian architecture which should be retained”. Local businessman Les Vickers paid £110,000 for the building in 1978 with a scheme to turn it into a hotel and conference centre, however these plan fell through and in the early 1980s the building’s lower floor was converted into “Turn Ups” nightclub and “Bloomers” pub. In 1990 Canadian Business Parks of Bedfordshire acquired the building with plans to restore it, but this never happened as the company hit financial problems.

The building continued to deteriorate throughout the early 1990s and in 1996 Sheffield City Council served a legal notice on the owners to effect repairs. However, no maintenance was carried out, rain came in through the damaged roof and period fireplaces were stolen. The Council in partnership with English Heritage sealed the building against further damage and it was then acquired by English Partnerships, the Government agency for regeneration. The building has been restored, and now carries the name Canada House. The lower floors were occupied by No. 1 Oriental Buffet Restaurant, but this was closed by 2011. There is office space on the upper floors.

As of 2022, Sheffield Music Academy are turning the building into "Harmony Works" - a centre for music teaching in Sheffield

== Architecture ==
The building is constructed in the Italian Renaissance Revival style. Among the highlights of the architecture are the four paired granite Corinthian columns on both the ground and first floor. The main door is round arched with steps and is flanked by two figures of Atlas on pedestals supporting a segmental Pediment. The roof has four square corner pinnacles topped with spires.
