= Commercial Street, Sheffield =

Street in Sheffield, England

Coordinates: 53.3828°N 1.4672°W

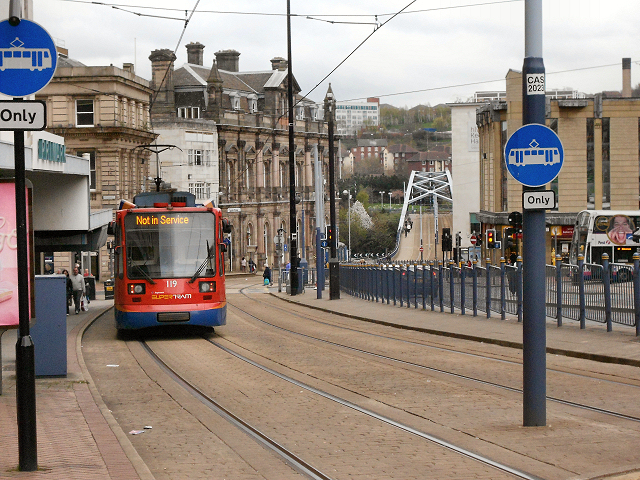
A Supertram departing Fitzalan Square tram stop on Commercial Street.

Commercial Street is one of the main thoroughfares and shopping areas in the city centre of Sheffield in South Yorkshire, England. Commercial Street connects Park Square to the High Street. Fitzalan Square and the Haymarket junction are located on the western end of the street as it meets the High Street near Arundel Gate.

A number of notable buildings are located on the street, including Canada House, The Ponds Forge International Sports Centre is located on Commercial Street.

== History ==
Prior to the 1830s, the road was part of Jehu Lane, the section that became Commercial Street was developed as part of a wider city development.
