= Hugh Hutton Stannus =

Hugh Hutton Stannus (21 March 1840 – 18 August 1908) was a sculptor, architect and author. In his early career he worked with the sculptor Alfred Stevens; he was in later life a lecturer at art colleges.

== Life ==
Stannus was born in Sheffield on 21 March 1840; his father, the Rev. Bartholomew Stannus, was a member of an old Irish family, and his mother Jane was daughter of the Rev. William Hutton of Belfast. His first artistic training was gained in Sheffield under Henry Dent Lomas at the Sheffield School of Art, after which he was articled to the firm of H. E. Hoole & Co. in that town, whose foundry was then engaged in producing work from the designs of the sculptor Alfred Stevens.

=== Early career with Alfred Stevens ===
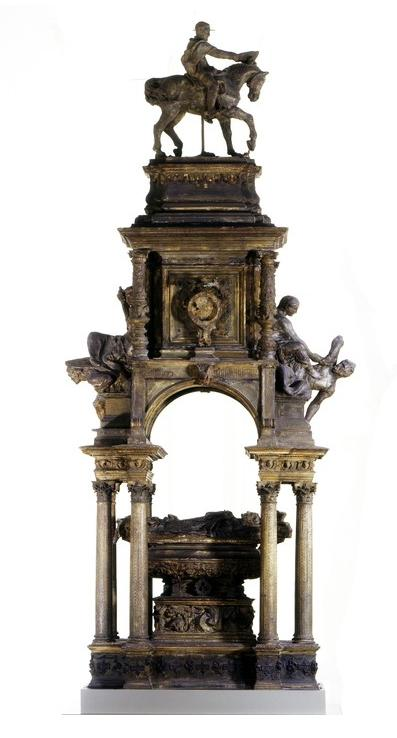
Alfred Stevens's model for the Duke of Wellington monument; Stannus worked with Stevens to produce the monument.

From this apprenticeship resulted a close acquaintance with the details of artistic metal casting. Some designs by Stannus for foundry work were selected for the Exhibition of 1862, and an "Essay on the History of Founding in Brass, Copper, and Bronze" won him in 1881 the freedom and livery of the Founders' Company, of which he became in 1907 sub-warden. A more important consequence of the employment at Hoole's was the personal acquaintance with Alfred Stevens. Stannus became his pupil, his assistant, his devoted friend, and afterwards his biographer. With Stevens he worked at the production of the Wellington monument for St Paul's Cathedral, and the long story of the delays which beset that production may be read in Alfred Stevens and his Work (1891), an important folio in which Stannus commemorated his master.

=== As architect ===
Some years before the death of Stevens in 1875 Stannus appears to have decided to make his training more definitely architectural, and in 1872 he was studying architecture at the Royal Academy Schools. In 1873 he passed the voluntary examination of the Royal Institute of British Architects with such distinction as to be awarded the Ashpitel Prize. In 1877 he won at the same institute the silver medal for essays with a paper on "The Decorative Treatment of Constructive Ironwork" (printed January 1882). He was elected an associate of the institute in 1880 and a fellow in 1887, taking till the year of his death an active part in its meetings and committee work. His independent practice dated from 1879, but was never extensive, and he never established an office. After bringing to a close Stevens's work on the Wellington monument, he was engaged simultaneously with Frederic Leighton and Edward Poynter in the preparation of a design for the decoration of the cupola of St Paul's Cathedral, which was not carried out.

Stannus's executed work consisted chiefly of structural or decorative alterations to existing buildings such as the Cutlers' Hall, the Sheffield United Gas Light Company Offices, the unitarian church, and the Channing Hall at Sheffield, the residences of Sir Edwin Durning-Lawrence at Ascot and at Carlton House Terrace, the Phoenix brewery at Bedford, a house for Mr Faber, M.P., at Beckenham, and Norman Macleod's church in Edinburgh. He designed the Sunday School centenary memorial at Essex church (unitarian), Notting Hill, and his own house, The Cottage, Hindhead, Surrey. He also carried out some work in the picture gallery at Kew Gardens designed by James Fergusson. When in 1903 it was decided further to complete the Wellington monument by the addition of the equestrian statue of the duke, Stannus, whose forethought had preserved Stevens's plaster model for the figure, was able to lay before the authorities several important drawings and other evidences of the original designer's intentions.

=== As teacher and lecturer ===
His energies were mainly absorbed from the age of forty to sixty in the work of a teacher and lecturer, to which he brought exceptional powers of analysis and great lucidity of expression. From 1881 to 1900 he taught modelling at the Royal Academy of Art, and he held appointments as lecturer at University College London, and at the Royal College of Art, South Kensington. For two years (1900–1902) he was director of architectural studies at the Manchester School of Art, and subsequently (1905–1907) he lectured at the evening school of the Architectural Association. In 1890 and 1898 he was Cantor lecturer to the Society of Arts, and twice received the Society's silver medal. In 1891 he delivered for the same society a course of lectures on Romanesque Architecture in North Italy.

=== Interests ===
Stannus belonged to the Hellenic and Japan Societies, to the St Paul's Ecclesiological Society, to the Society of Arts and Crafts, and to that for the Preservation of Ancient Buildings. He had great knowledge of all periods of art, being a continual student and a frequent traveller. His collection of examples, sketches, and photographic lantern-slides was exceptional.

=== Family ===
In 1872 he married Ann, daughter of John Anderson. He died at Hindhead on 18 August 1908, survived by his wife, two daughters and a son, Dr Hugh S. Stannus.

== Publications ==
Apart from the work on Stevens, Stannus's publications, which were largely based on his lectures, were:

- Decorative Treatment of Natural Foliage (1891)
- Decorative Treatment of Artificial Foliage (1895)
- Theory of Storiation in Applied Art (1898)
- Some Principles of Form Design in Applied Art (1898)
- Some Examples of Romanesque Architecture in North Italy (1901)

He also revised for the 3rd (English) edition Franz Sales Meyer's Handbook of Ornament, and assisted James Fergusson in some of the illustrations for his books. He left materials for a work on the classic orders, a subject upon which he had some original ideas.
