= St Matthew's Church, Sheffield =

Anglican church in Sheffield, South Yorkshire, England

Coordinates: 53.3796°N 1.4733°W

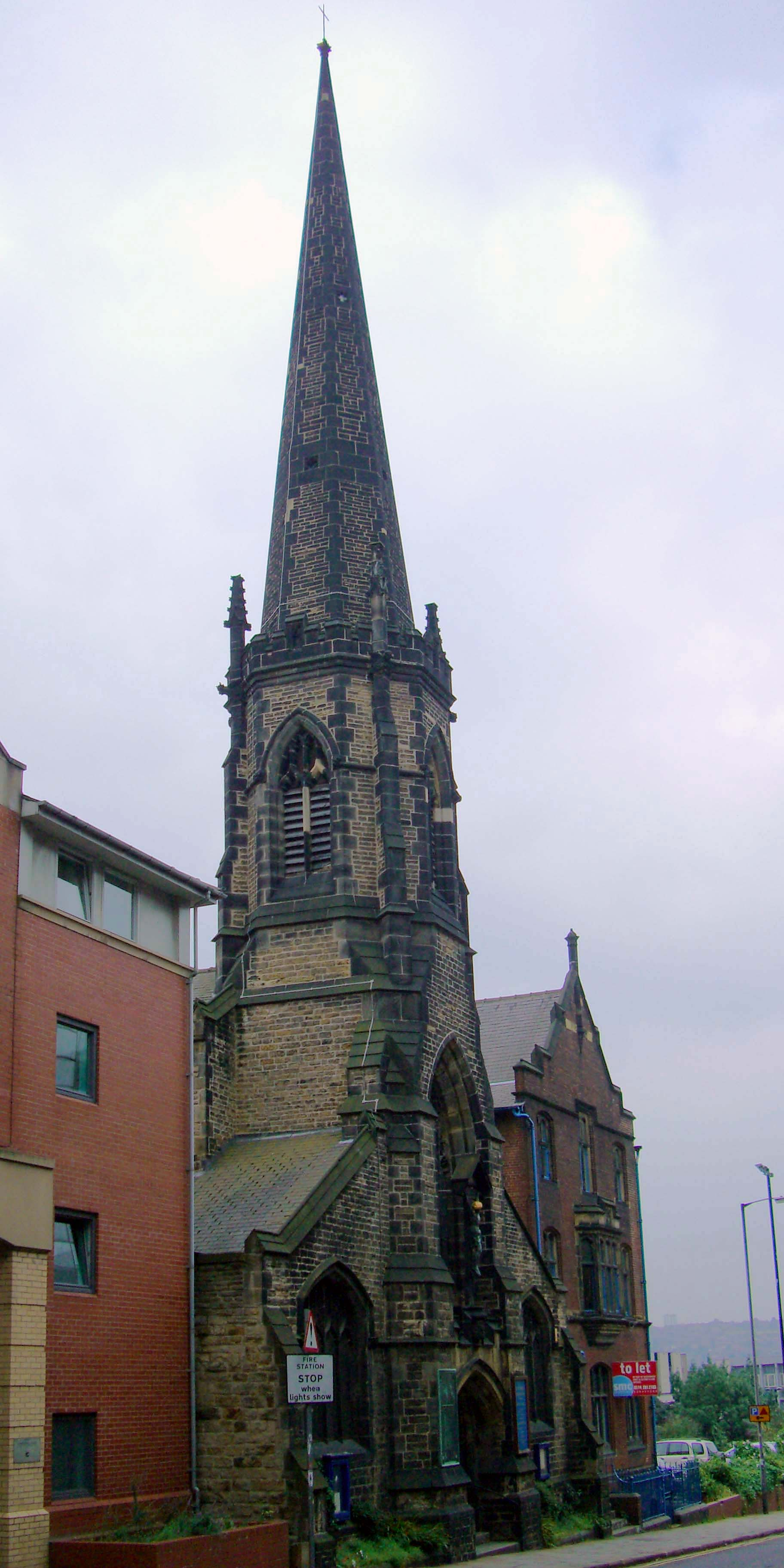
- St Matthew's Church, Sheffield
- St Matthew's Church, Sheffield
- OS grid reference: SK 35137 87108
- Denomination: Church of England
- Churchmanship: Anglo Catholic
- Website: Official website

History
- Dedication: St. Matthew

Administration
- Province: York
- Diocese: Sheffield
- Parish: Sheffield

Clergy
- Bishop: The Rt Revd Stephen Race SSC (AEO)
- Vicar: Fr Grant Naylor SSC

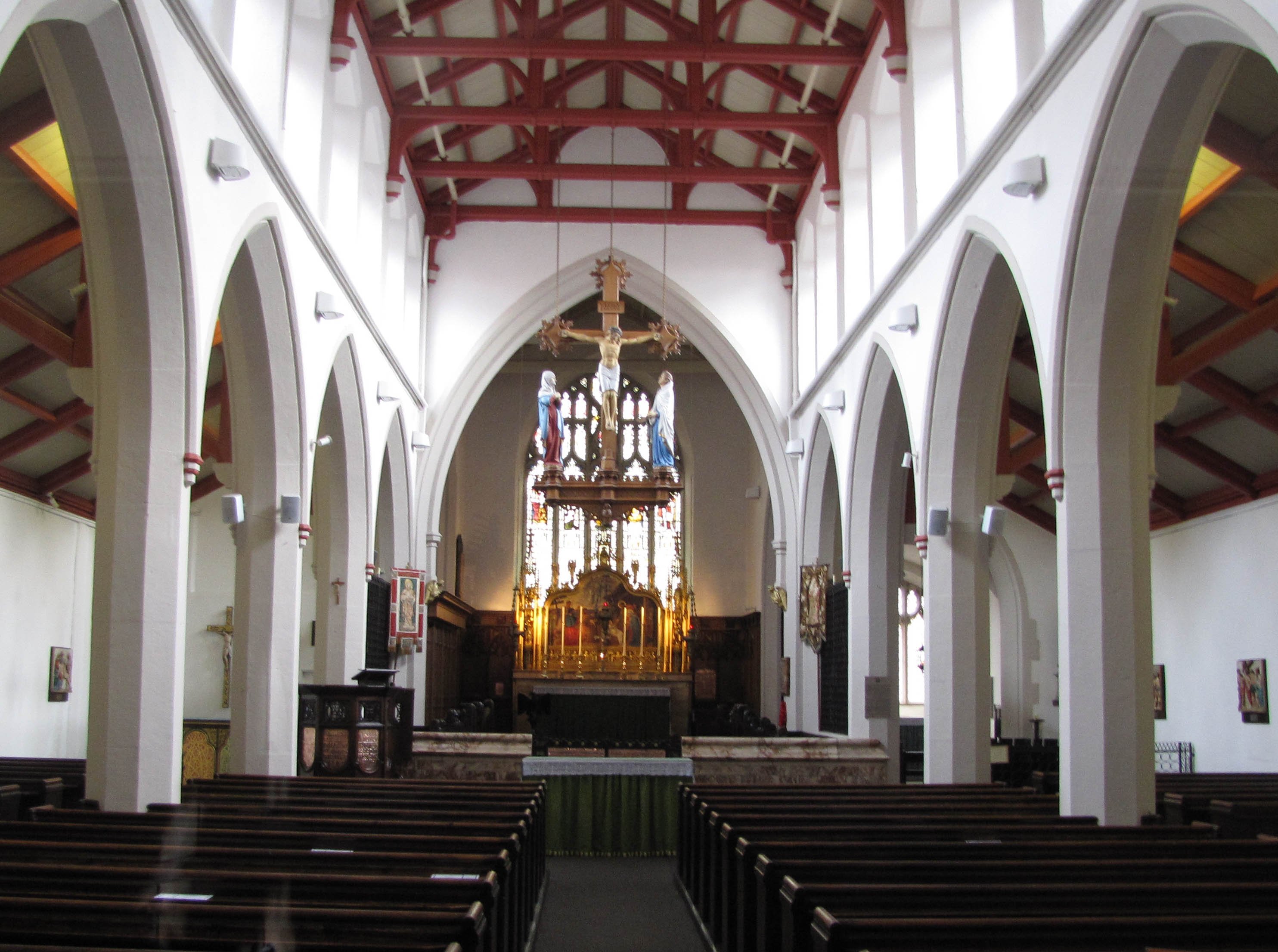
The interior of the church.

St Matthew's Church, more usually known as St Matthew's Carver Street, is situated on Carver Street in the centre of Sheffield, South Yorkshire, England. It is a Grade II listed building located at grid reference SK351871. The church is part of the Anglo-Catholic movement.

== History ==
The church was built in the middle of the 19th century for the newly established St Matthews parish which was created when the original Sheffield parish was subdivided into smaller parts in 1848. The first vicar J.F. Witty conducted the parish's early services in a school on Carver Street. Within a few years sufficient funds had been raised to build a permanent place of worship. Land was purchased on Carver Street for £600 and the foundation stone for the church was laid on 1 June 1854 with the construction being carried out by Flockton & Son. The building was consecrated on 6 June 1855 by the Archbishop of York Thomas Musgrave.

The church which has been described as "a neat building with a graceful spire" cost £3,297 to build, the main benefactor was the snuff maker Mr. Henry Wilson of Westbrook Mill who contributed £1,020, the Ecclesiastical Commissioners granted £200 and the Incorporated Church Building Society gave £250. The rest of the money was raised by Reverend Witty who was still asking for subscriptions for the last £200 in November 1856. In its early years the church had seating for 731 people which accommodated a large local congregation, the church being surrounded by a highly populated district of slum housing.

In 1882 George Campbell Ommanney became the third vicar of St Matthew's, he remained at the church for 54 years until his death in 1936. Ommanney was known as the “People’ Priest” and was close to the common people, he chose to live in the slums nearby to the church. He converted St Matthew's into a focal point for teaching and practice of the Catholic Revival in the Church of England, he wrote his memoirs in the book Ommanney of Sheffield in the final years of his life. St Matthews remained undamaged throughout World War II although there were casualties throughout the parish as many buildings were damaged in the immediate vicinity during the Sheffield Blitz of December 1940.

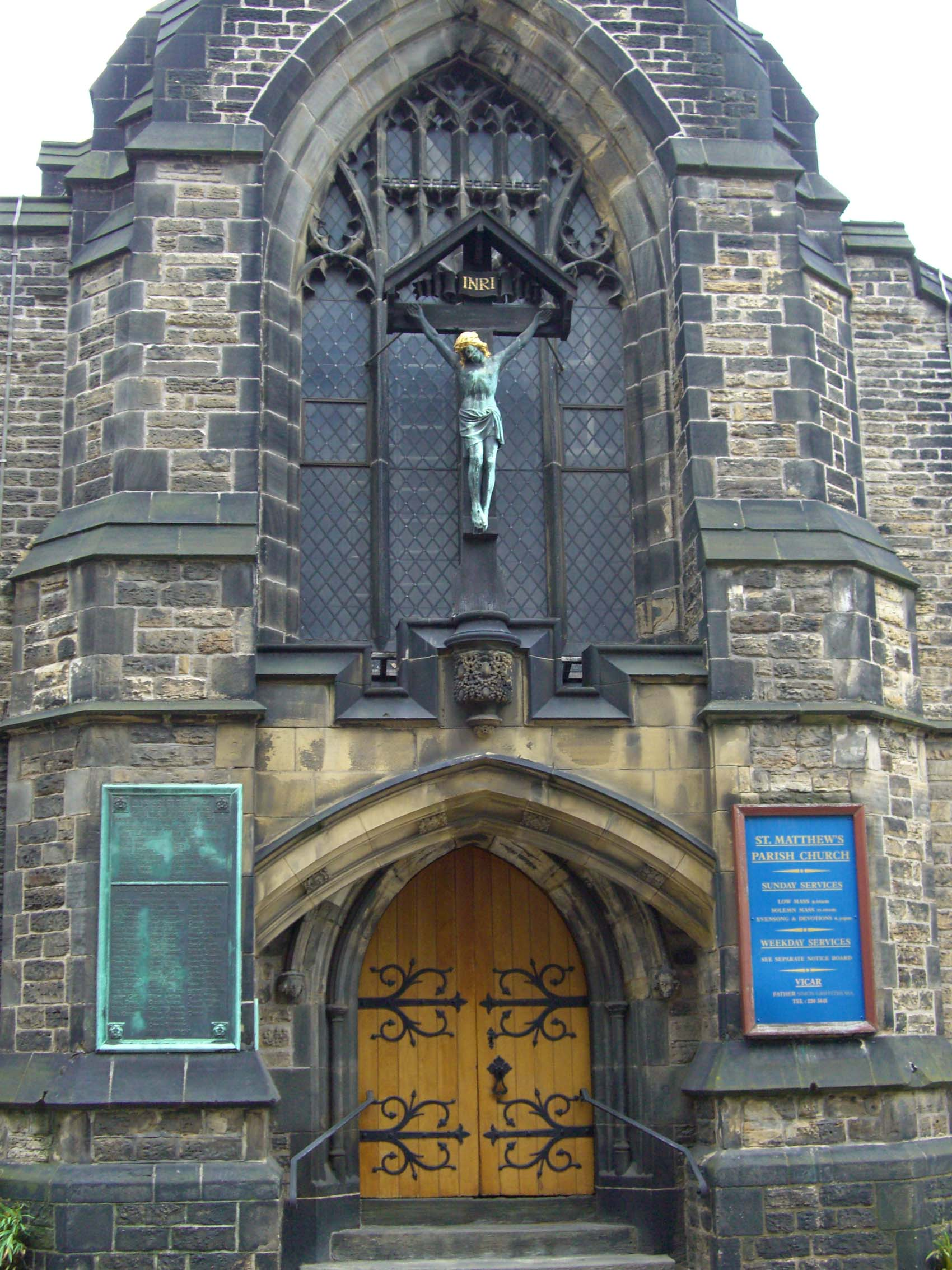
The main entrance on Carver Street with the War Memorial plaque to the left and Crucifixion statue above.

In August 1956 parts of the church were damaged by fire including the organ and the Lady Chapel, which had only just been restored. In 1960 the last residential houses in the parish were demolished for shops and businesses, leaving the church without a resident congregation. In the 1970s the Church was threatened by the proposal to build a major road in the area which would have meant demolition but the plans were eventually changed. In 1982 the church's two function rooms were upgraded and in 2000 the church received a major restoration externally and internally with funding from the Heritage Lottery Fund. The internal work included the cleaning of carbon deposits from the reredos and paintings, a result of Sheffield's heavy industrial past.

== Present day ==
The parish of St Matthew's has a growing resident population (pop: 5,690), and is a busy church serving a lively city centre. It is now surrounded by the Devonshire Quarter of Sheffield, an area of independent retail outlets, pubs and bars with a large student population. The church is open daily for services, visitors and private prayer.

The parish stands in the Anglo-Catholic tradition of the Church of England. As it takes a traditionalist view on the ordination of women, the parish receives Alternative Episcopal Oversight from the Bishop of Beverley (currently The Rt Revd Stephen Race).

== Architecture and the interior ==
There is an octagonal tower with a tall spire on top at the front (west) end of the church which contains one bell, with the main entrance below on Carver Street. There are three main stained glass windows, the east window which dates from 1886 depicts the Incarnation and includes St Matthew and other saints in its design. It is by J. D. Sedding who re-designed the east end of the church at the same time, putting in a new chancel. The two west windows are by Lavers, Barraud and Westlake and date from 1902, other lighting in the church is by clerestory windows.

The altar and reredos are also by Sedding with carvings by Frank Tory and a centrepiece painting of the Adoration by Nathaniel Westlake. The interior is richly furnished with many of the designs by Henry Wilson. The church organ dates from 1992, it is made in the classic British style by Martin Goetze and Dominic Gwynn and is based on the early work of master organ maker Bernard Smith. Next to the main entrance is a war memorial which takes the form of a plaque listing worshippers and parishioners who gave their lives in World War I. Just above the door is a statue of the Crucifixion. Next door to the church is St Matthew's House, a former Clergy House and Sunday School.

== See also ==
- List of Commissioners' churches in Yorkshire
