= Frank Tory and Sons =

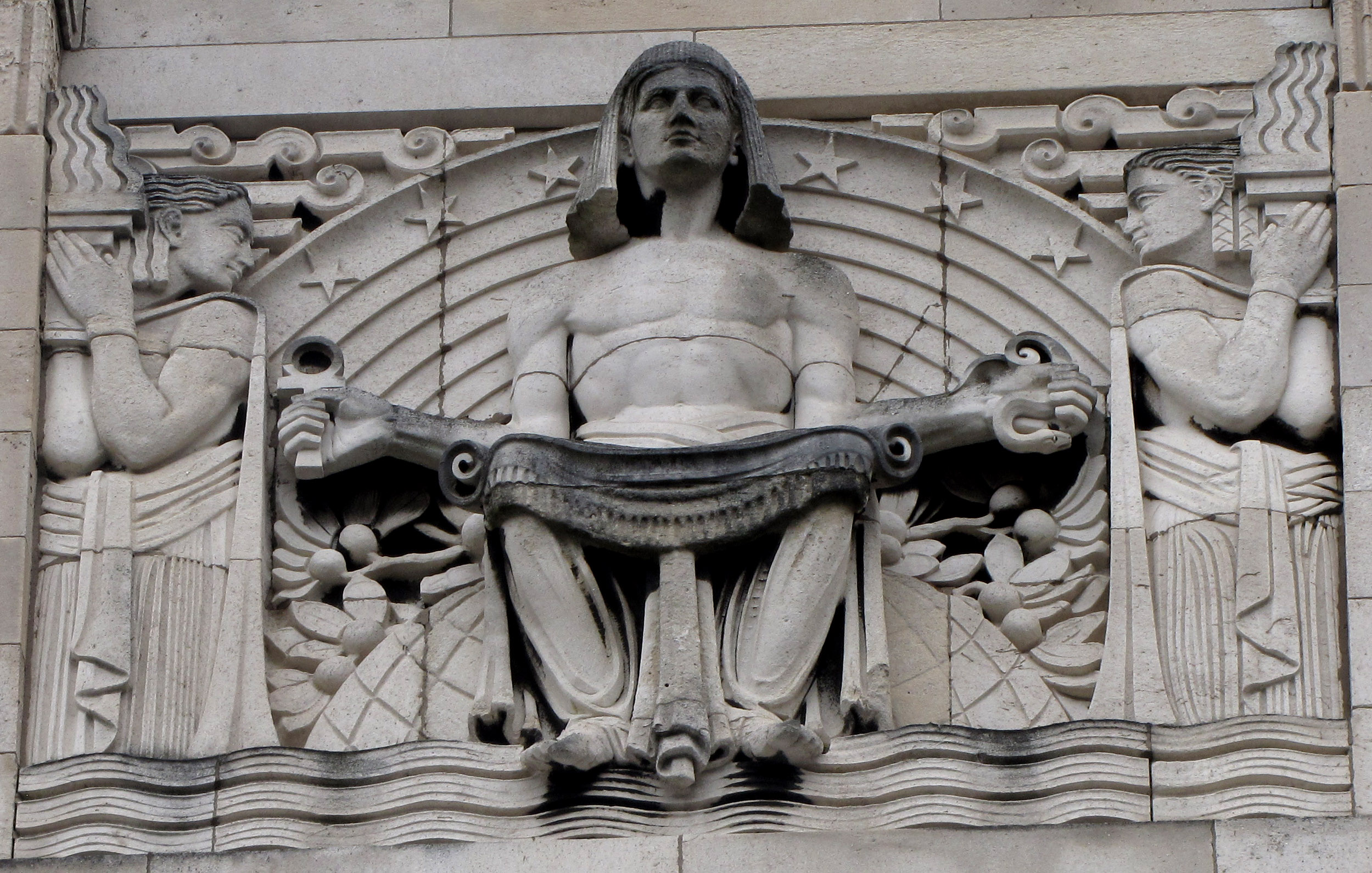
Carvings on Sheffield Central Library by Alfred and William Tory

Frank Tory and Sons were an English family firm of Sheffield based architectural sculptors whose work enhances some of the city's finest late 19th century and early 20th century buildings. Apart from stone carving the family also worked in wood, marble, bronze and fibrous plaster. The firm operated from the early 1880s until the 1950s and consisted of Frank Tory and his twin sons Alfred Herbert and William Frank.

== History ==
Frank Tory (1848–1939) originated from London and trained at the Lambeth School of Art, he came to Sheffield in 1880 to accept the carving contract on the Corn Exchange, a building commissioned by the 15th Duke of Norfolk as part of a comprehensive plan to improve Sheffield's markets. Tory's work on the Corn Exchange was to such a high standard that it was suggested that if he stayed in Sheffield there would be plenty of work for him. He set up a studio and workshop in Sans Pavis (Sands Paviours), a lane amongst the cluttered terraced houses of central Sheffield.

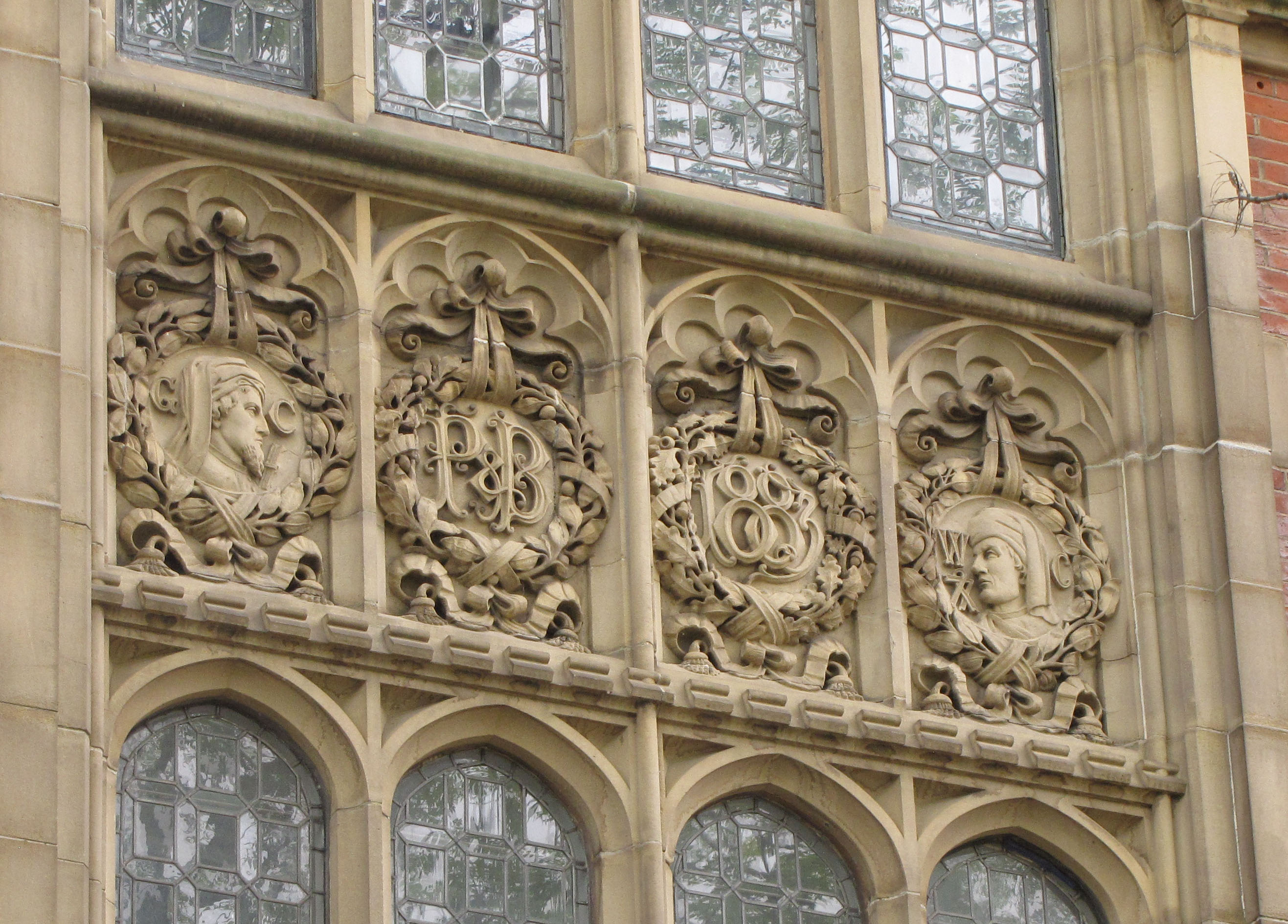
Frank Tory's work on Parade Chambers includes images of Geoffrey Chaucer and William Caxton with the date 1883. P & B stands for the printing firm Pawson & Brailsford for whom the building was originally built.

Frank Tory's twin sons Alfred Herbert (1881–1971) and William Frank (1881–1968) were born in Winter Street, Crookesmoor and attended Broomhill Council School and the Weston Academy for Sons of Gentlemen. They trained under their father who also taught at the Sheffield School of Art and had a strong will to follow in their father's footsteps and they eventually entered the family firm, ultimately taking it over. Alfred and William were identical twins, on the only surviving photograph of the two, nobody knows which one is which. During the 1920s the firm moved premises to Ecclesall Road, at a site which is now the Porter Brook pub at Sharrow. The ageing Frank had a house adjoining the workshop while the sons lived nearby in Banner Cross. When Alfred and William retired in the 1950s the firm was wound up, with the change in architectural styles meaning that sculpture was out of fashion on modern buildings.

== Best known works ==
=== Frank Tory ===
Frank Tory's first commission in Sheffield, the Corn Exchange (1881) is no longer standing, it was gutted by fire in 1947 and demolished in 1964. It was an imposing building near the site of the present day Park Square roundabout, it had much stone dressing including 20 carved stone heraldic shields around the walls bearing the arms of the Howards, Talbots and Abney-Hastings. Tory's work on the Corn Exchange brought him into contact with the architect Matthew Ellison Hadfield and his son Charles who encouraged him to set up business in Sheffield saying he would have a plentiful supply of work. Hadfield employed Tory again during construction of Parade Chamber (1883–85) on High Street with Tory providing garlanded portraits of Geoffrey Chaucer and William Caxton and an array of grimacing gargoyles. In 1888 he worked on St John's Church, Ranmoor sculpturing stone and marble reredos and The Last Supper carved in alabaster flanked by Saint Peter and Saint Paul.

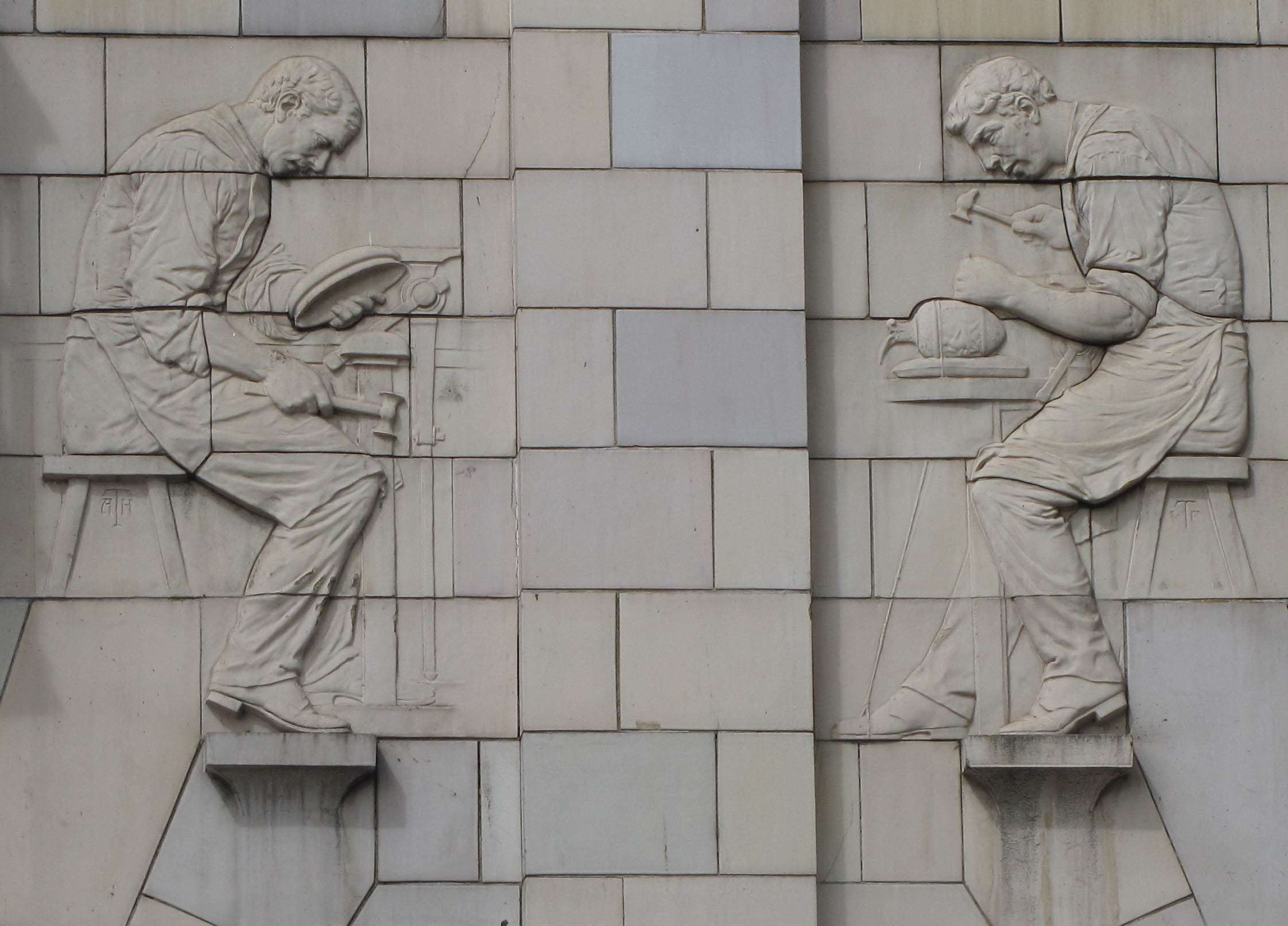
Alfred and William Tory's depiction of the Sheffield trades on the White Building in Fitzalan Square.

Other works include:

- St Matthew's Church, Sheffield (internal carvings)
- Cathedral Church of St Marie, Sheffield, alabaster Pieta
- Cairns Chambers, Church Street, statue of Earl Cairns.
- Carmel House, Fargate, external relief sculptures “The Creation” (1890)
- St Ignatius Church, Preston, angels and reredos (1886)

=== Alfred and William Tory ===
The Tory twins were well known for accepting a large range of commissions both big and small. They are probably best known for the sculpture work on Sheffield City Hall which opened in 1932 and included an understated dentil corniche and narrow frieze on the central block as well as decorative carving to the tops of the Corinthian capitals. Their work on Sheffield Central Library (1934) includes medallions carved around the main entrance representing Literature, Music, Drama, Architecture, Sculpture, Painting, Mathematics, Chemistry and Astronomy. High up on the south-west corner of the library is an Egyptian type figure representing Knowledge and holding the ankh and asp to represent the choice between good and evil. The brothers contributed two friezes for the Mappin Art Gallery (1937), one above the main entrance depicts the Shrine of Knowledge with various creatures while the other on the east side portrays men working in the Sheffield metal trades.

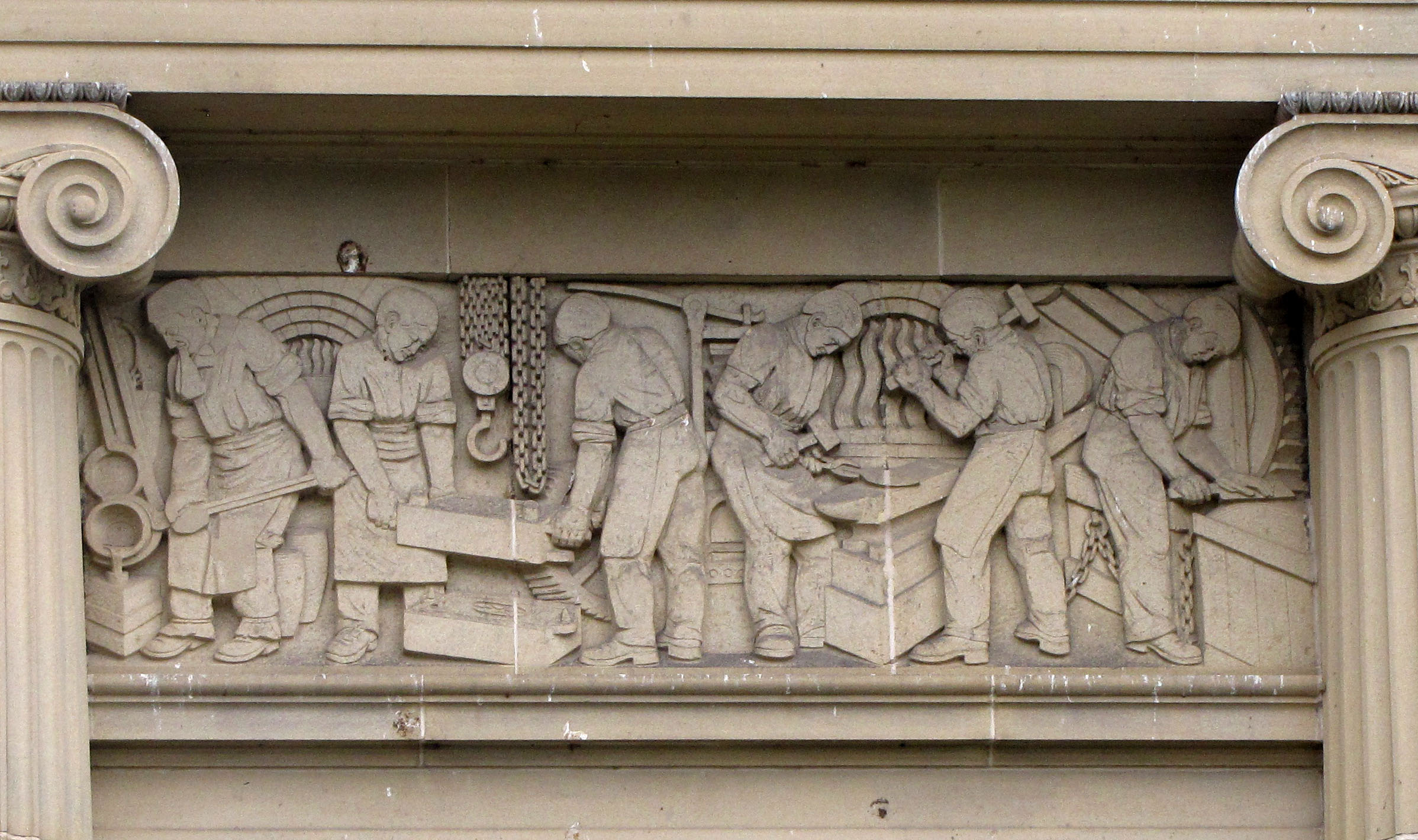
The frieze over the east door at the Mappin Art Gallery.

Other works include:

- The White Building, Fitzalan Square. Ten figures in relief on a faience facade depicting the Sheffield trades. (1908)
- Victoria Hall, Sheffield, carved decorations of the baroque tower, including a portrait of John Wesley in the gable (1908)
- Leeds Civic Hall (1933)
- Chesterfield Town Hall (1938)

== Gallery ==
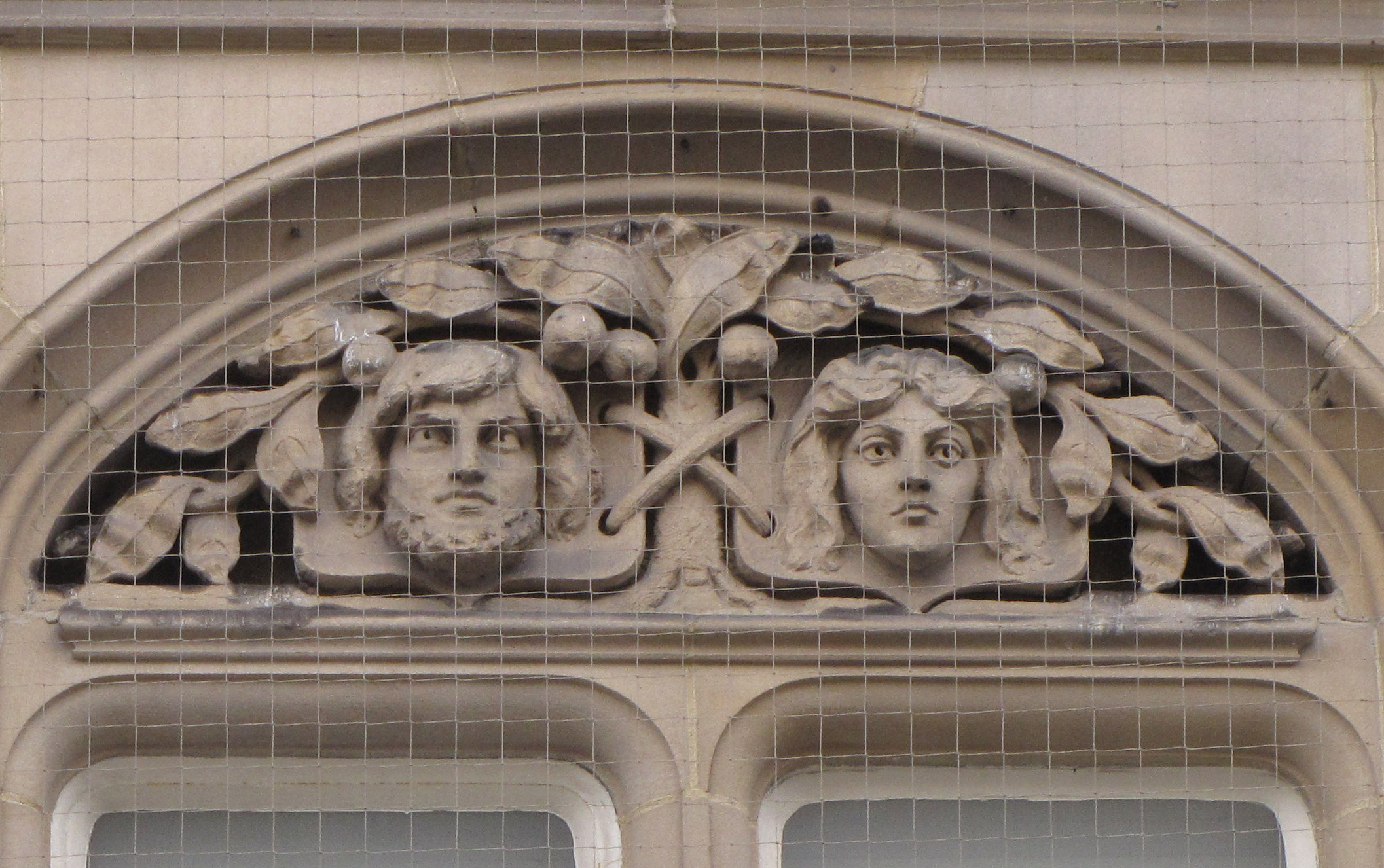
”The Creation”, Carmel House, Fargate by Frank Tory

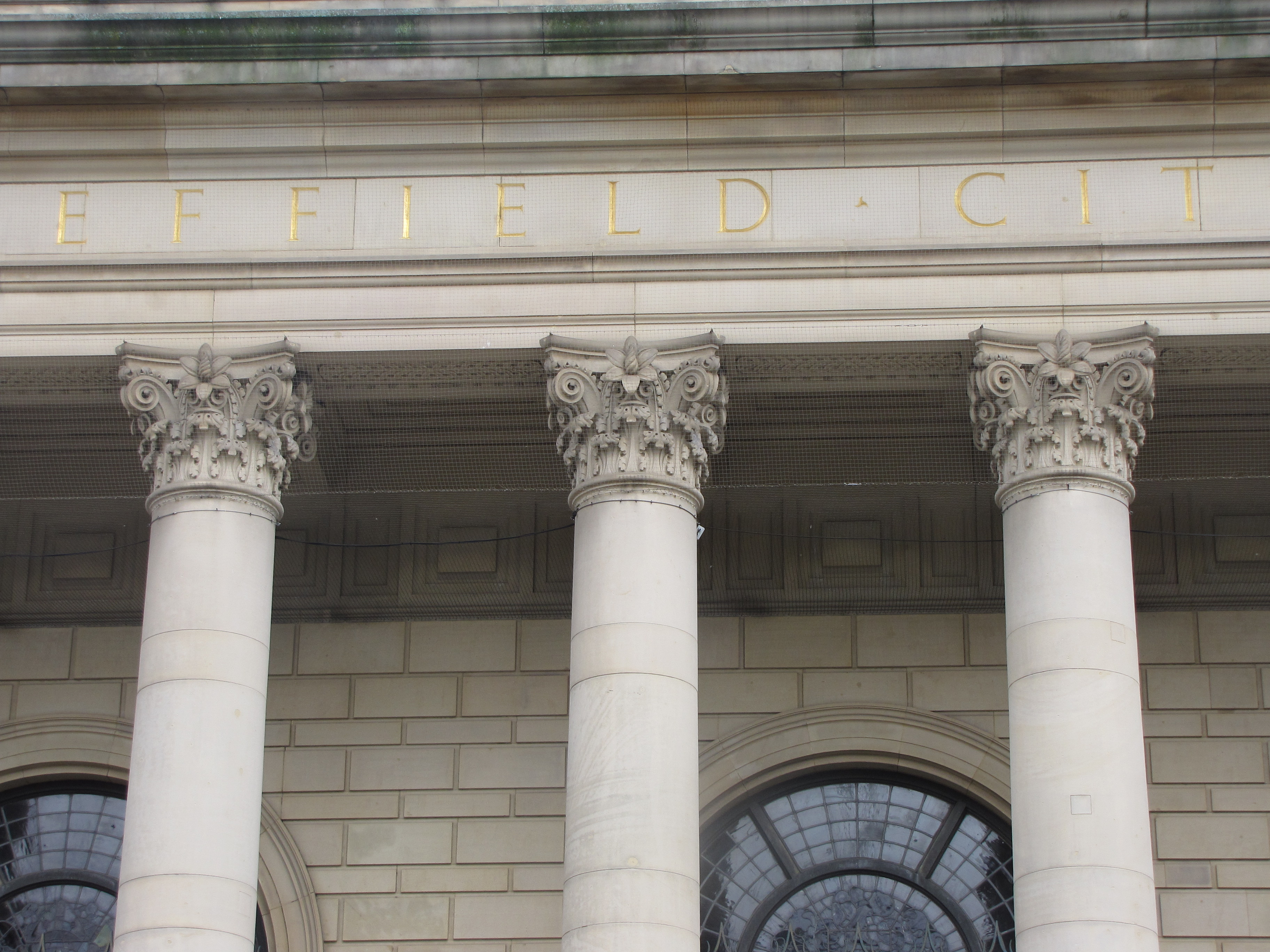
Sheffield City Hall by Alfred and William Tory

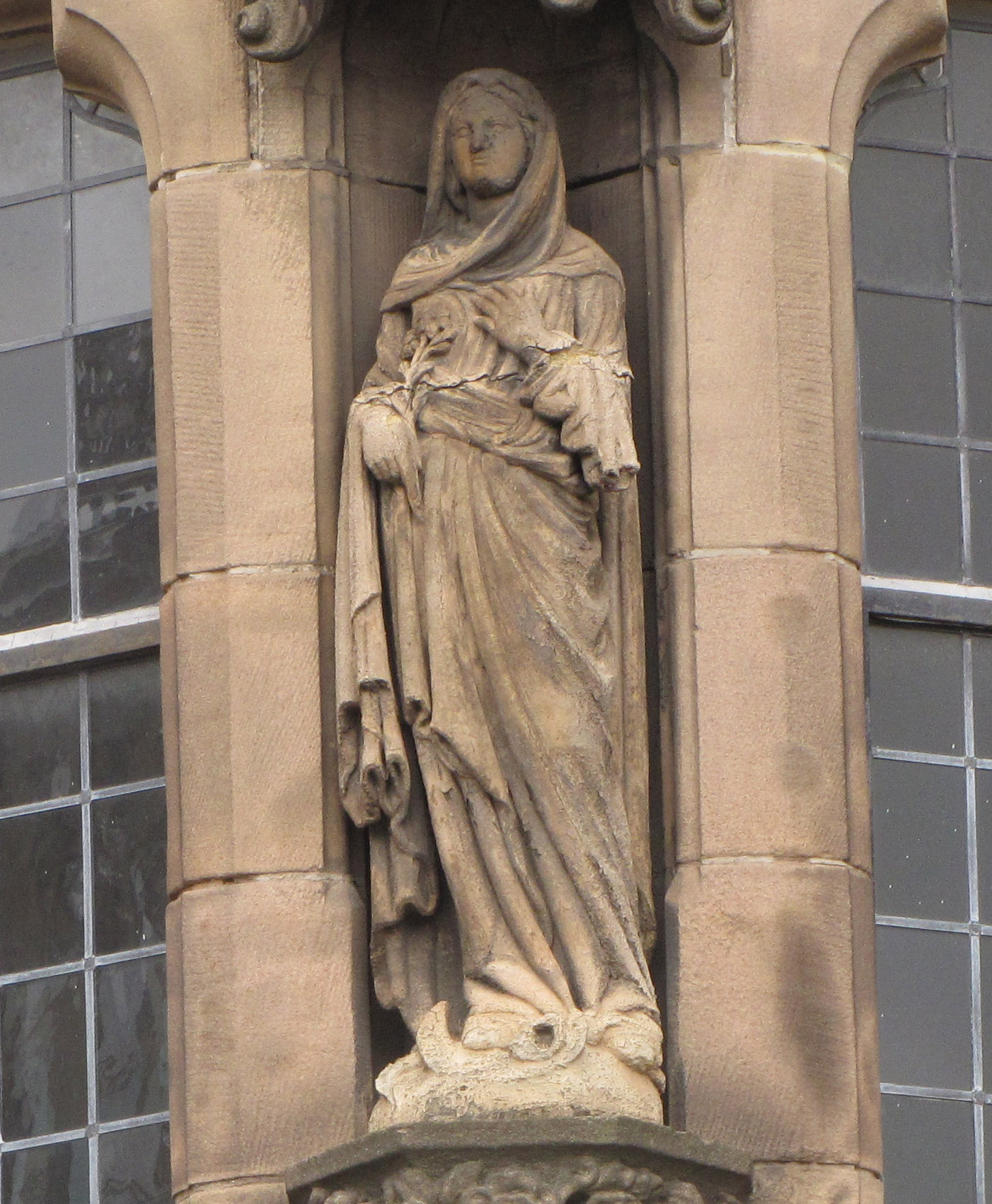
St Marie's Cathedral Presbytery. Virgin Mary by Frank Tory.

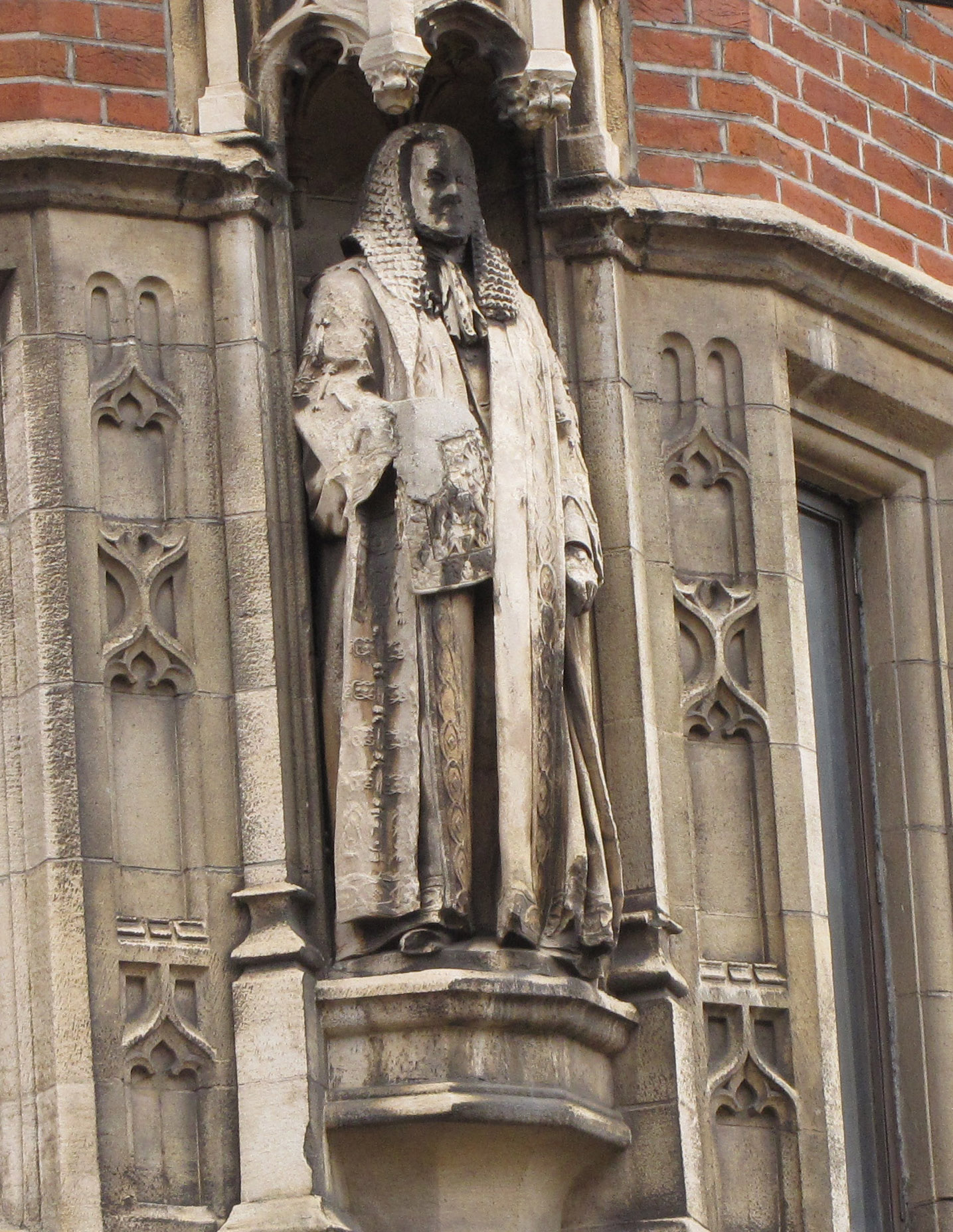
Earl Cairns by Frank Tory on Cairns Chambers.

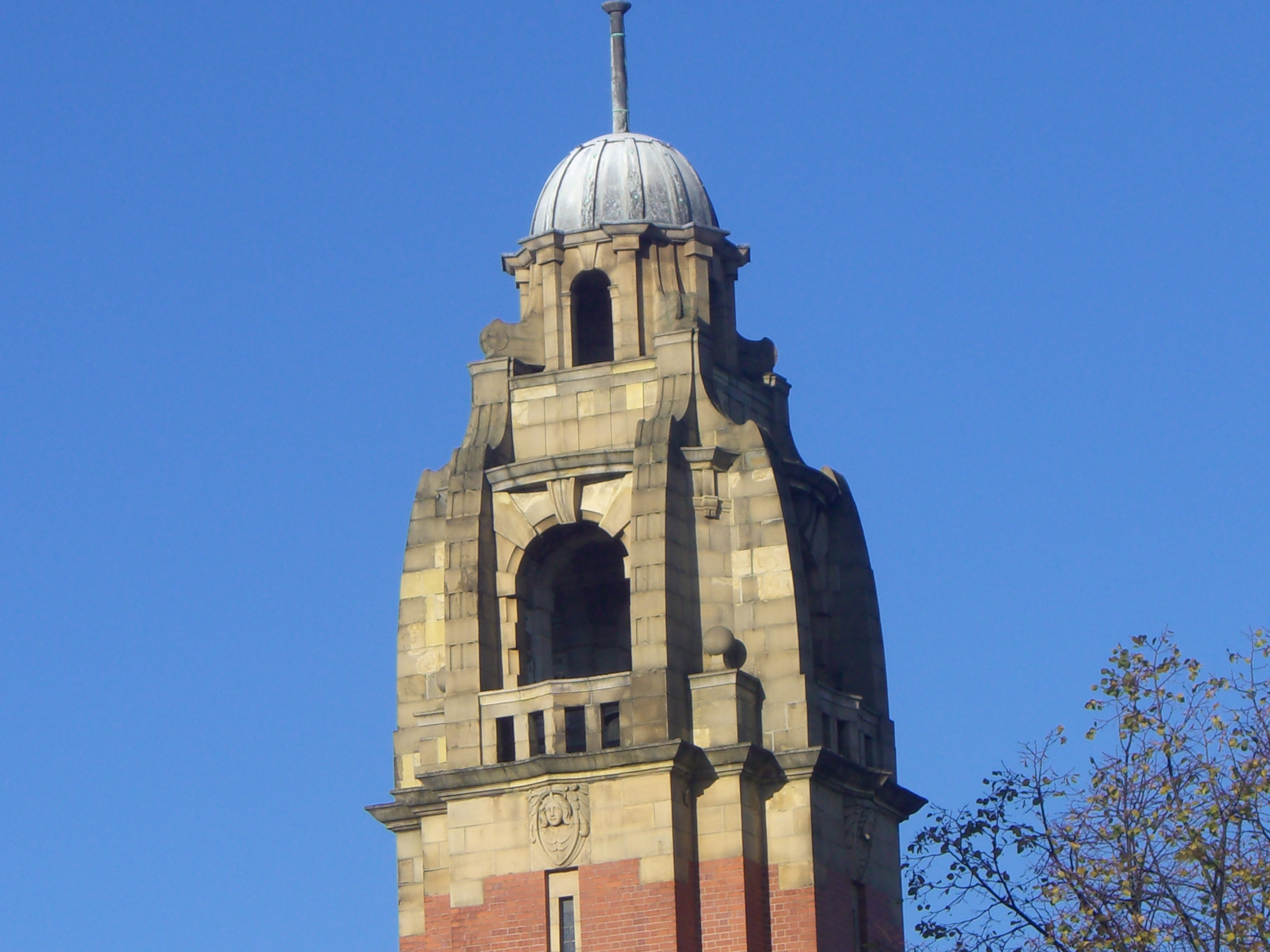
Top of Victoria Hall by Alfred and William Tory.
