= High Street, Sheffield =

Street in Sheffield, England

Coordinates: 53.3829°N 1.4671°W

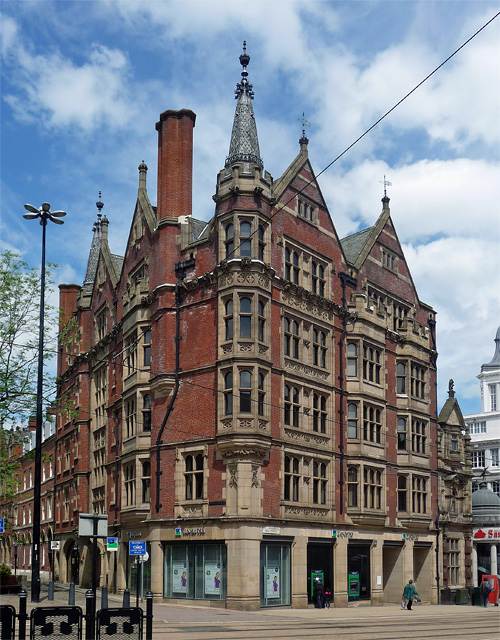
Parade Chambers on the high street

High Street is one of the main thoroughfares and shopping areas in the city centre of Sheffield in South Yorkshire, England, located at the approximate grid reference of SK356874. High Street starts at the Commercial Street, Fitzalan Square and Haymarket junction and runs for approximately 400 metres west to conclude near the Sheffield Cathedral where it forms a Y-junction with Fargate and Church Street. High Street has the traditional wide variety of shops, financial institutions and eating places which are associated with any British town centre.

== History ==
=== Early history ===
High Street has existed for as long as Sheffield has been a settlement of any importance. The first documented mention was in the 12th century when it was written that Worksop Priory owned five principal properties on the north side of High Street. The connection between Sheffield and Worksop Priory comes from William de Lovetot, lord of Hallamshire, who founded the Priory in 1103. These strong connections gave High Street the alternative name of Prior Gate as late as the 18th century. Sheffield's first Master Cutler Robert Sorsby bought a house on the south side of High Street in 1611 and had completely rebuilt it by the time he took office in 1624. In 1637 High Street had eleven shops at the entrance to the churchyard, these were an overspill from the Tuesday and Thursday markets in Market Place. Another Master Cutler, Christopher Broomhead, who took office in 1696 had a house in Prior Row. Towards the end of the 17th century, High Street had some of the best houses in town with many being rebuilt in stone with slate roofs.

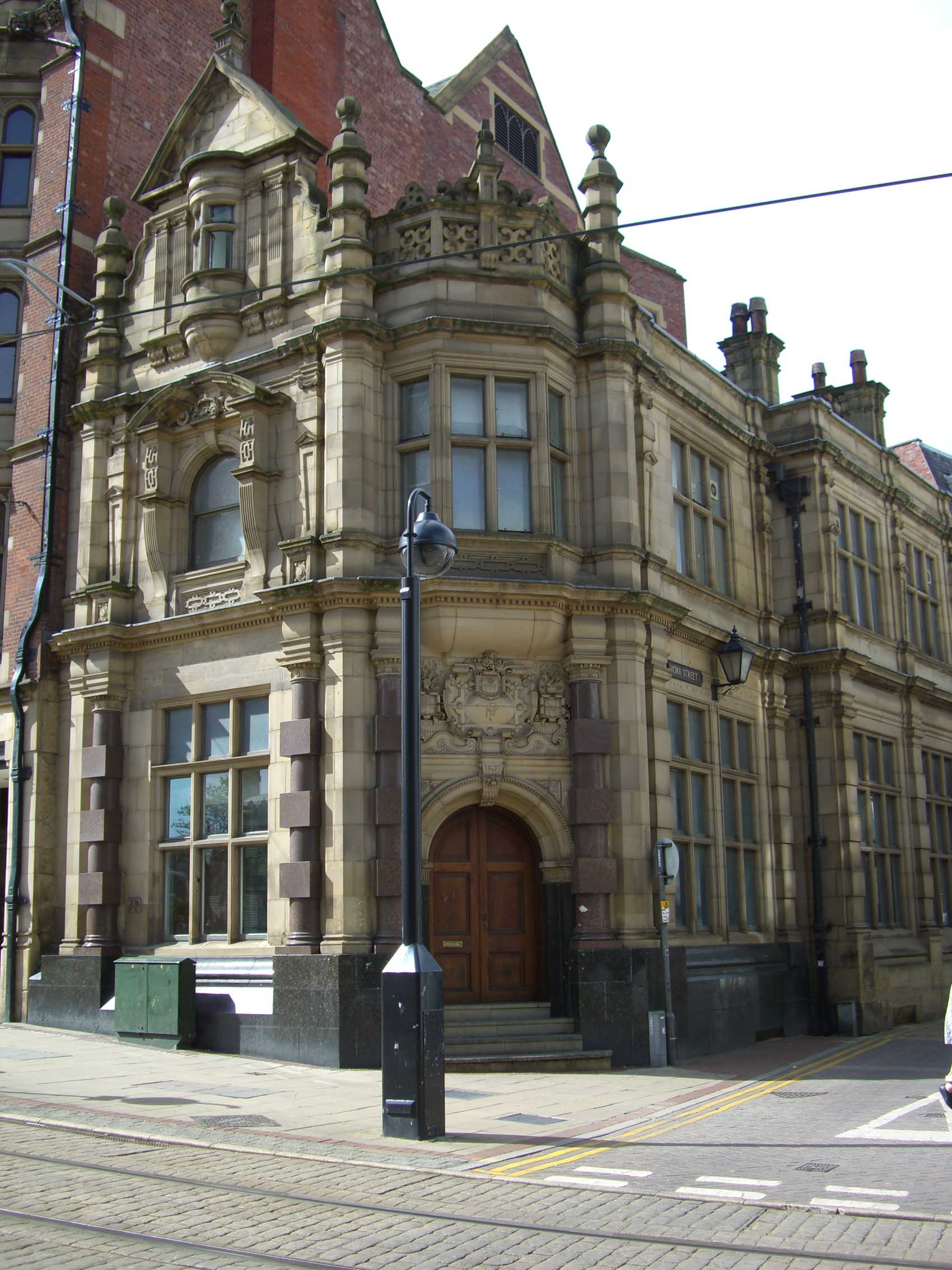
The former London and Midland Banking Company building on the corner with York Street.

High Street was the site of the original Sheffield Town Hall, which was situated by the church gates; it was a modest building which was replaced by a more impressive structure in 1808 on Waingate. For many years High Street remained no wider than it had been in the Middle Ages; it was too narrow for horse trams to pass through. It had the timber framed bailiff's house (built in 1574) on its south side right up to the end of the 19th century.

=== Victorian improvement ===
Plans were first put forward to widen High Street by the local council in 1875 but work did not start until 1895 due to objections from shopkeepers and wranglings over compensation and property boundaries. Between 1883 and 1885 Parade Chambers was built on the north side of High Street (at the corner with East Parade). It was designed by Charles Hadfield in the Tudor Gothic Style and is regarded as one of the best examples of architecture in the city centre; the notable stone carving is by Frank Tory. Also part of this block on the corner of York Street are the former bank buildings, these were erected in 1895 by Holmes and Watson for the London and Midland Banking Company. It is built of Huddersfield stone with Labrador and Swedish granite used for the base and pilasters, there is much Renaissance detail on the front of the building.

High Street was doubled in width by the 1895 improvement work as all the old buildings on the south side of the street were demolished and replaced by more elegant structures. These included the Foster's Buildings near the junction with Fargate, built in the French domestic Gothic style by Flockton, Gibbs & Flockton for a Gentlemen's outfitters shop with four floors of offices above. The upper floors were reached by an American elevator, the first one in Sheffield. Also amongst the new buildings on the south side was the original John Walsh department store, which opened in 1900. The store later became Rackhams and then House of Fraser and at its peak had over 600 employees before being destroyed in the Second World War. Kemsley House designed by Gibbs, Flockton & Teather is a grade two listed building better known as the Star and Telegraph building it was opened on the north side of High Street in 1913 and is named after Gomer Berry, 1st Viscount Kemsley, the newspaper proprietor. It now houses the headquarters of the Sheffield Star newspaper (although the entrance is on York Street) and with its white brickwork and elegant clock tower it is a familiar landmark. During the demolition of old shops to make way for Kemsley House a hoard of old gold and silver coins was discovered behind a cellar wall. The coins dated from 1547 to 1625; a silver pendant was also found with the coins.

=== Second World War ===
High Street suffered badly as a result of the Sheffield Blitz in December 1940 when many of the high Victorian buildings on the south side of the street were devastated by German bombing. These were the newer buildings which had appeared as a result of the road widening at the end of the 19th century. All of the older shops on the northern side were spared by the bombing. Buildings which were destroyed in the Blitz included the Marples Hotel (on the corner with Fitzalan Square) where 70 people lost their lives. The C&A Modes store was hit by three bombs and gutted, while Walsh's department store, the Grand Clothing Hall and the Westminster Hotel were all destroyed.

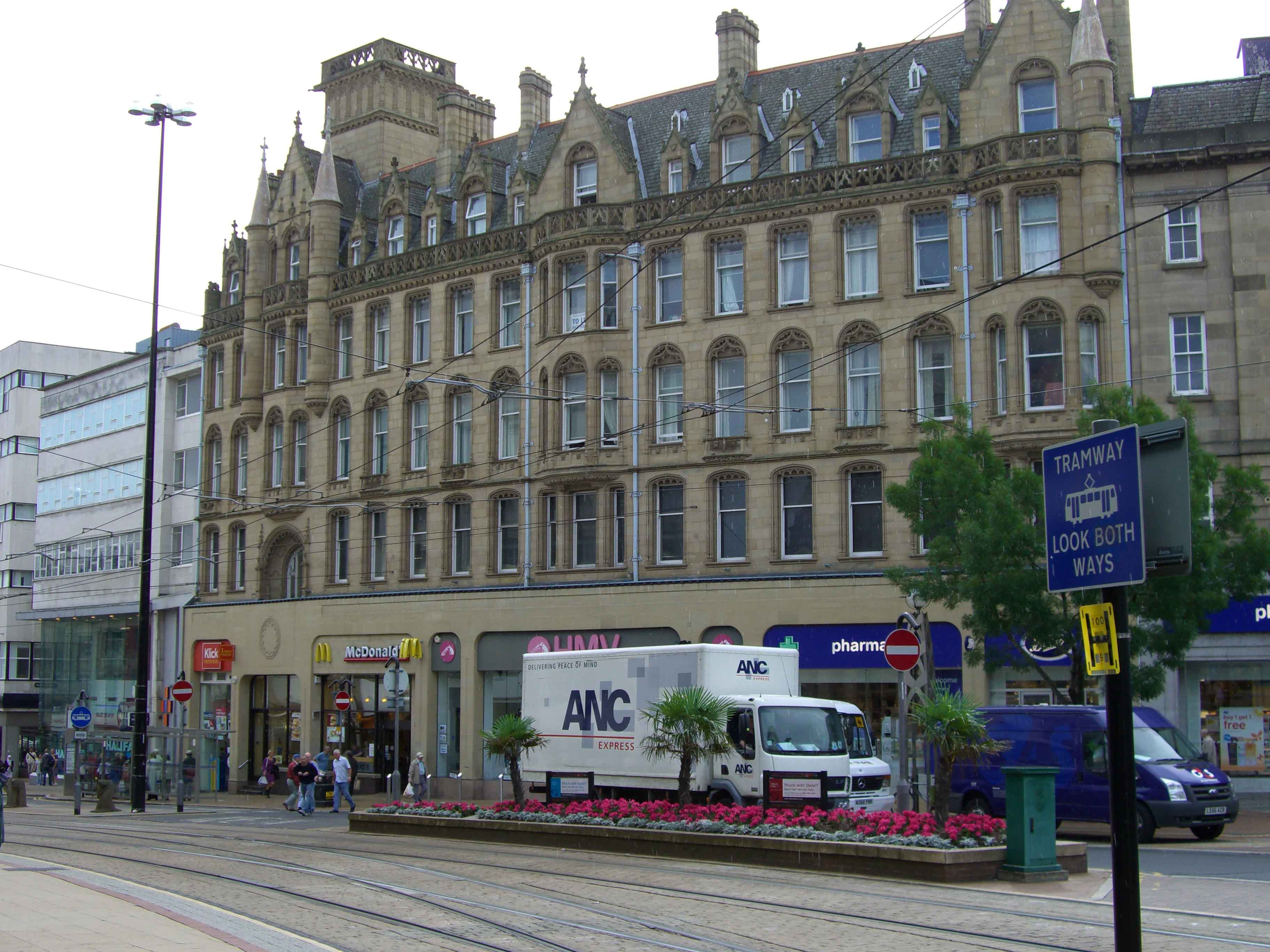
The Foster's Buildings, constructed in Huddersfield Stone, has impressive pinnacles and parapets.

=== Post-war ===
Post-war rebuilding of the damaged High Street was slow; it was not until 1951 that the damaged Walsh's store was demolished with a new store designed by JS Beaumont and built by George Longden Ltd., opening on 13 May 1953. A new Marples Hotel opened in 1959 while C&A Modes also rebuilt their store, although the building is now occupied by a hotel. The early 1960s saw a radical change to High Street's junction with Angel Street when a decision was taken to give cars easier access to the city centre. This involved the creation of Arundel Gate, a dual carriageway which approached from the south and met the High Street / Angel Street junction at a roundabout. These changes resulted in the demolition of Change Alley, an ancient thoroughfare which ran between High Street and Norfolk Street and had had timber-framed houses on it many years previously.

The changes made by the construction of Arundel Gate included the building of a network of underground walkways which linked Arundel Gate, Commercial Street, Snig Hill and Fitzalan Square. High Street was located at the head of this network with escalators taking pedestrians into the subways. It was known officially as Castle Square but acquired the nickname locally as 'The Hole In The Road' which boasted a large central open air circle with entrances to many stores, convenient newsagents, a bus enquiry centre and even a tropical fish tank stocked with mature fish. The "Hole in the Road" subterranean system was opened on 27 November 1967, however, the walkways fell into disrepair during the early 1990s and were finally closed to the public on 10 January 1994. The "Hole in the Road" network was filled in with rubble from the Hyde Park flats and re-developed as Castle Square tram stop on the South Yorkshire Supertram network.

== Present day ==
For part of its length High Street carried the A621 road before it was downgraded in the 2000s. The South Yorkshire Supertram system was completed in early 1995 and runs along High Street in its own reserved half of the road. The other half is a one way system for regular traffic travelling west; there is a tram stop midway along known as Castle Square. In recent years, High Street has seen a shift away from retail and towards hospitality, particularly fast food, and leisure. In 2022, Wendy's opened their largest restaurant in the UK, and first in the north of England, on High Street.
