= Castle Square, Sheffield =

Plaza in the City of Sheffield, England

Coordinates: 53.3831°N 1.4661°W

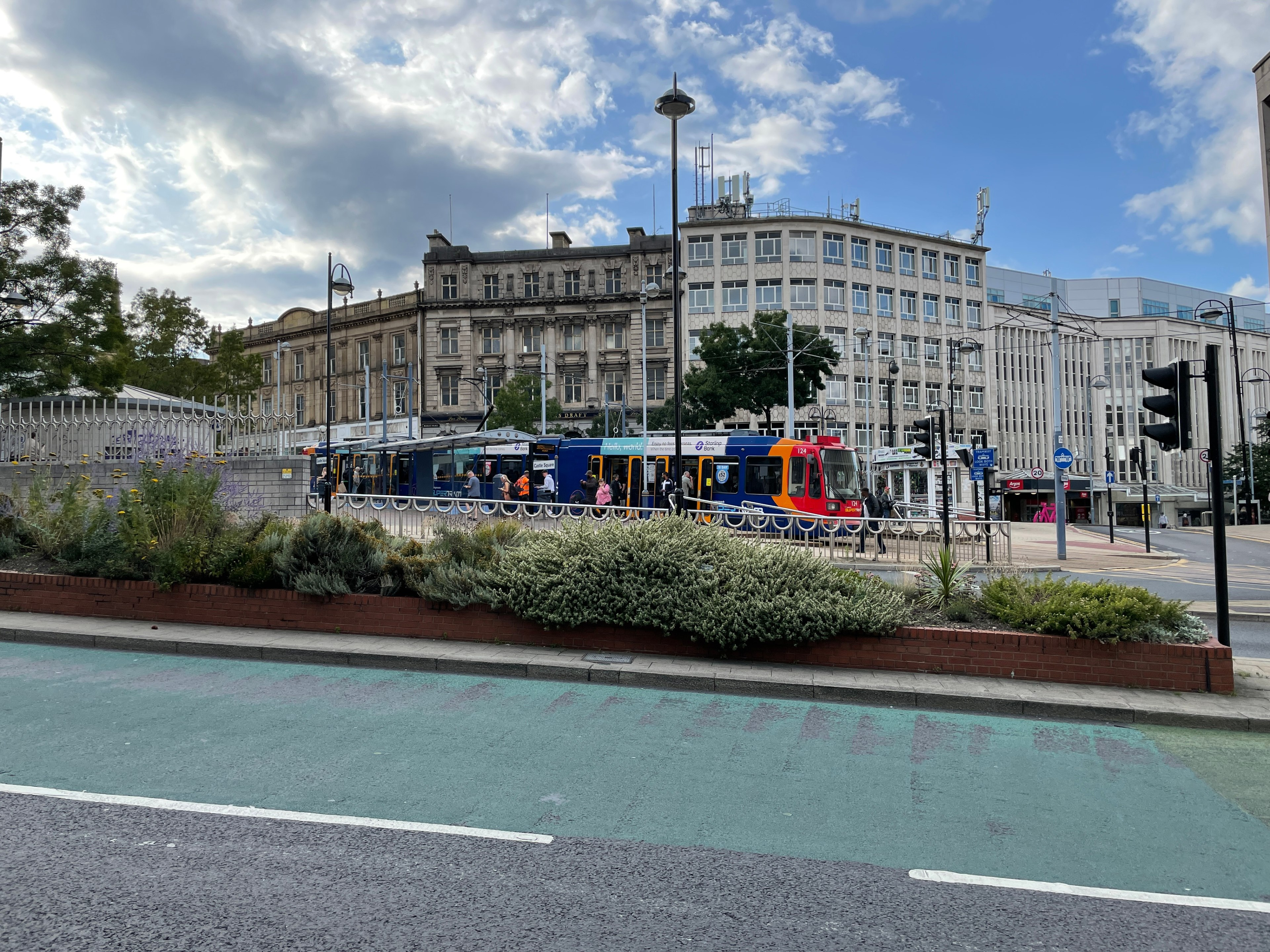
Sheffield Supertram at Castle Square

Castle Square is the plaza at the intersection of High Street, Angel Street, and Arundel Gate in the City of Sheffield, England. This name was given to the square in the 1960s to reflect the proximity of the square to the site of Sheffield Castle, which was formerly located a short distance to the north-east.

== History ==
=== Market Place ===
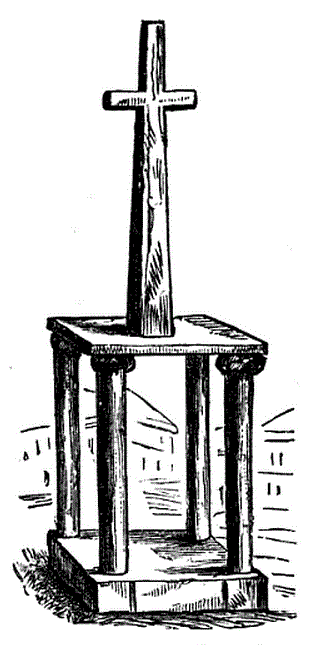
A sketch of the Market Cross by Alfred Gatty

Castle Square was originally known as the Market Place (or the Shambles); markets were held on this site from 1296 (the name Market Place still applies to the short street, now pedestrianised, between High Street and Angel Street). A market cross was erected here in 1568 but was taken down in 1786, when the market moved into the new Fitzalan Market Hall that was built over part of the market square.

A monument to the poet Ebenezer Elliott was erected on the same site in 1854 and was moved to Weston Park in 1875, where it can still be seen. The Fitzalan Market Hall was demolished in 1930, ending nearly 700 years of market trading at this spot.

=== Hole in the Road ===
Many buildings in the vicinity of the Market Place were damaged or destroyed on the night of 12 December 1940, when German aircraft bombed Sheffield. The bomb sites were cleared but most remained empty for many years. In 1968 many old streets were cleared to make way for the new Arundel Gate, a dual carriageway road that terminated at a large roundabout built on the former market place.

Underneath the roundabout a network of underpasses and shops was built (with a central area open to the sky), this formed a complex that was officially designated Castle Square but became affectionately known locally as "Oyle in t' Road" or Hole in the Road. A feature in the wall of the central area was a fish tank which contained 2000 gallons of water and usually 20 fish including carp, goldfish, bream, rudds and roaches.

Although considered by many to be a major city landmark, like many constructions of its time, it did not age well and was very dilapidated by the early 1990s. It lasted from 1967 until 1994, allegedly being filled in with the rubble from the recently demolished Kelvin Flats.

=== Supertram (1994) ===
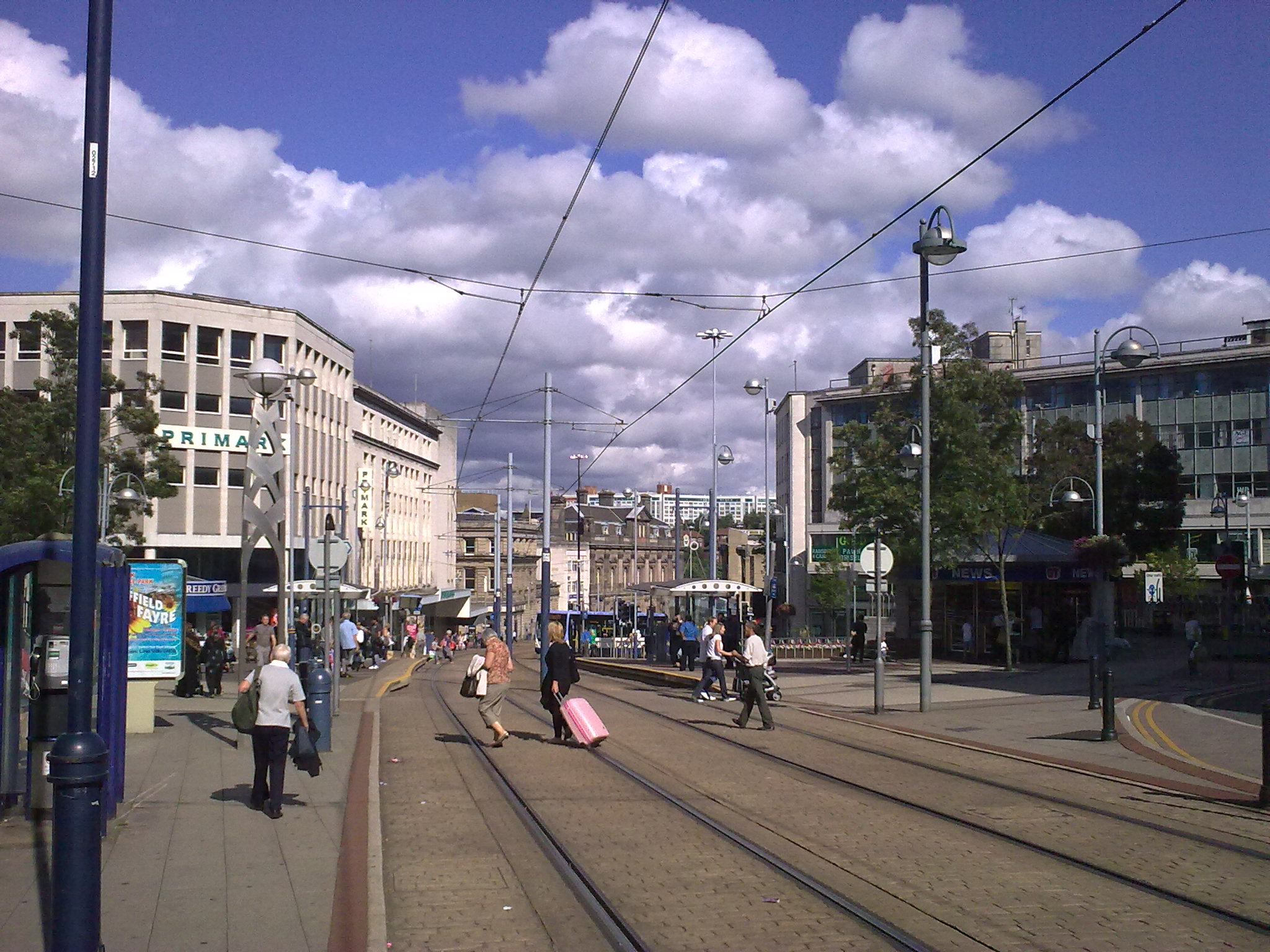
Supertram tracks, Castle Square

In 1994, as part of the works for the construction of Sheffield's new Supertram network, the underground portion of the Hole in the Road was filled in. The roundabout was removed and the whole area landscaped. All four lines of the Supertram system cross the square and call at Castle Square tram stop, one of five tram stops in the city centre.

Preceding station	South Yorkshire Supertram	Following station
Cathedral towards Middlewood	Yellow Route	Fitzalan Square towards Meadowhall Interchange
Cathedral towards Malin Bridge	Blue Route	Fitzalan Square towards Halfway
Cathedral terminus	Purple Route	Fitzalan Square towards Herdings Park
Cathedral terminus	Tram-train Route	Fitzalan Square towards Parkgate
