= Frederick Samuel Willoughby =

Right Revd Frederick Samuel Willoughby
- Auxiliary Bishop of St Pancras
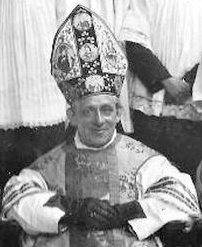
- Willoughby at the consecration of J. I. Wedgwood, 1916
- Church: Old Roman Catholic Church in Great Britain
- Elected: 1914
- Quashed: 1915

Orders
- Ordination: 1887 (in the Church of England); 1914 (conditional reordination)
- Consecration: 1914 by Arnold Mathew

Personal details
- Born: 1862
- Died: 1928 (aged 65–66)
- Spouse: Louisa Telfer
- Occupation: Church of England priest; Academic administrator; Old Catholic bishop
- Education: St Catharine's College, Cambridge (BA 1883); Lichfield Theological College

Principal of St Chad's Hostel
- In office 1902–1904
- Preceded by: New creation
- Succeeded by: Stephen Moulsdale

Frederick Samuel Willoughby (1862–1928) was a Church of England priest, academic administrator and later Independent Old Catholic bishop. While vicar of Hooton Pagnell, he founded and was first principal of St Chad's Hostel, which survives as St Chad's College, Durham.

After accusations were made against him by parishioners at a later parish, he resigned his holy orders in the Church of England in 1914, and was accepted into the Old Roman Catholic Church in Great Britain, where he was consecrated as a bishop. Though he was expelled from that church the following year, he consecrated a number of others as bishops, including J. I. Wedgwood who went on to found the Liberal Catholic Church.

== Church of England ==
=== Education and early ministry ===
He entered St Catharine's College, Cambridge in 1880, graduating BA in 1883, then trained for the ministry at Lichfield Theological College.

He was ordained deacon in 1887 and priest in 1888, and served his first curacy at Worfield, in rural Shropshire. During his time at Worfield, he joined the Society of the Holy Cross, a strongly Anglo-Catholic organisation. He remained there until 1894, when he began a second curacy at St Paul's Church, Worcester. In Worcester he met Louisa Telfer, daughter of a prison chaplain, and the two were married. They then moved to Parkgate, South Yorkshire, where Willoughby began a third curacy.

=== Hooton Pagnell and St Chad's Hostel ===
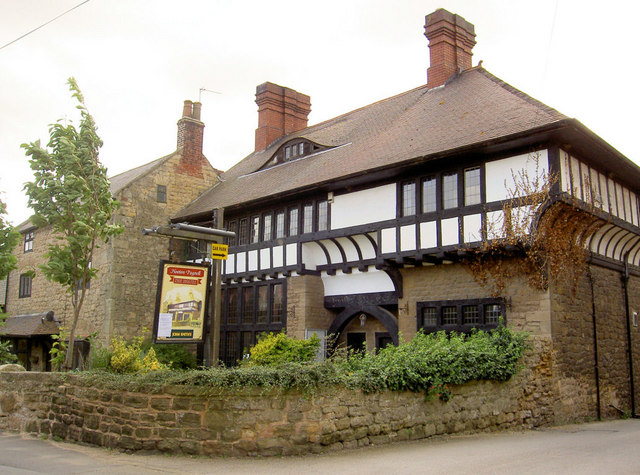
St Chad's Hostel, Hooton Pagnell

In 1899, he became vicar of Hooton Pagnell near Doncaster, where in 1902 he founded St Chad's Hostel to prepare men of limited means for entry to theological college. Initially he housed the students in his own vicarage, then in nearby houses and farms; then in 1903 the Lady of the Manor, Julia Warde-Aldam, funded a new building for the hostel, capable of accommodating 20 men.

However, in 1904, he fell out with the hostel, at about the time it expanded its operations with the opening of St Chad's Hall at the University of Durham. Willoughby's vice-principal, Stephen Moulsdale, became principal of both the Durham hall and the Hooton Pagnell hostel, and relations between Willoughby and the hostel were poor - the Hooton Pagnell vice-principal, Sydney Richards, was forbidden to celebrate mass in the church, and the hostel used St Wilfrid's Church, Hickleton for its major services while Willoughby remained vicar.

=== Stockton-on-Tees, accusations and relinquishment of orders ===
In 1906, Willoughby was appointed vicar of St John the Baptist, Stockton-on-Tees, where his Anglo-Catholic practices brought opposition from some parishioners. In 1914, accusations were brought by parishioners to Handley Moule, Bishop of Durham, that Willoughby had been involved in homosexual activity; he was asked to resign or face a full enquiry. He opted to resign, and on 3 July 1914 submitted a writ of relinquishment of holy orders, with the writ recorded as being related to 'allegations of immorality (sexual assault of children) and embezzlement'.

== Independent Old Catholicism ==
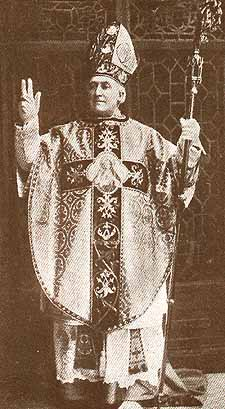
Arnold Mathew

=== Admission and consecration ===
Willoughby approached Arnold Mathew, who had been consecrated in 1908 by the Old Catholic Church as a missionary bishop to Britain, though had by that point fallen out with the church for consecrating further bishops without their authorisation and had established himself as head of the Old Roman Catholic Church in Great Britain. Willoughby was conditionally re-ordained into Mathew's church. Shortly afterwards an election for a new bishop was held among the clergy of the church, with Willoughby coming first and James Ingall Wedgwood second, and on 28 October 1914 Willoughby was consecrated by Mathew, Bernard Mary Williams and John Briggs Seaton at the Royal Bell Hotel, Bromley, and given the title Auxiliary Bishop of St Pancras.

Following his consecration, Willoughby published pamphlets entitled "The Conversion of Great Britain: What can the Ancient Catholic Church of England do?" with Mathew, and "The Ancient Catholic Church of England: Her Authority, Her Mission, Her Work, Her Appeal" alone.

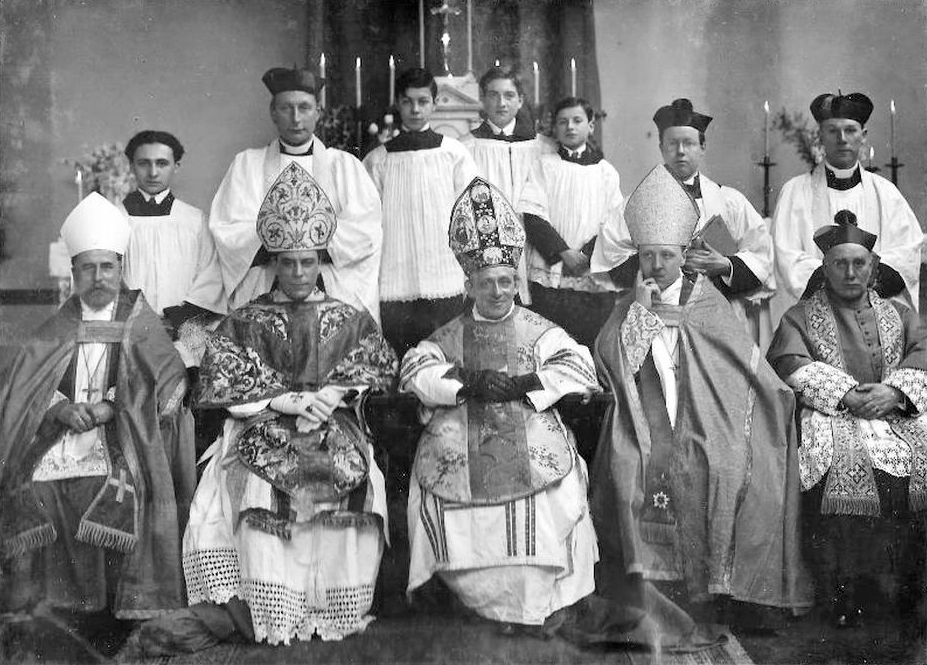
Consecration of Wedgwood by Willoughby, King and Gauntlett, 13 Feb 1916

=== Split from Mathew ===
However, in May 1915, John Bull magazine printed an article repeating allegations it had printed the previous June regarding Willoughby and the scandal which had led to his departure from Church of England ministry. When this was brought to Mathew's attention, he summoned a synod (which Willoughby declined to attend), after which Mathew expelled Willoughby from the ORCCGB.

In September 1915, Willoughby consecrated Bernard Gauntlett and Robert King, both theosophists who were at the time part of the ORCCGB; then in 1916, Willoughby, Gauntlett and King consecrated J. I. Wedgwood, who shortly afterwards founded the Liberal Catholic Church. Willoughby did not join the LCC, but in a 1927 letter to the "Occult Review" defending their orders called himself 'the "Father' of their episcopate'.

In November 1916 Willoughby consecrated Frederick James at the Theosophical Temple, Maida Vale.

Later in his life Willoughby reconciled with the Roman Catholic Church; though in July 1922 he consecrated James Bartholomew Banks who went on to found the Independent Catholic Church, later renamed The Old Catholic Orthodox Church (Apostolic Service Church).
