= Stephen Moulsdale =

British priest and academic administrator

The Reverend Stephen Moulsdale
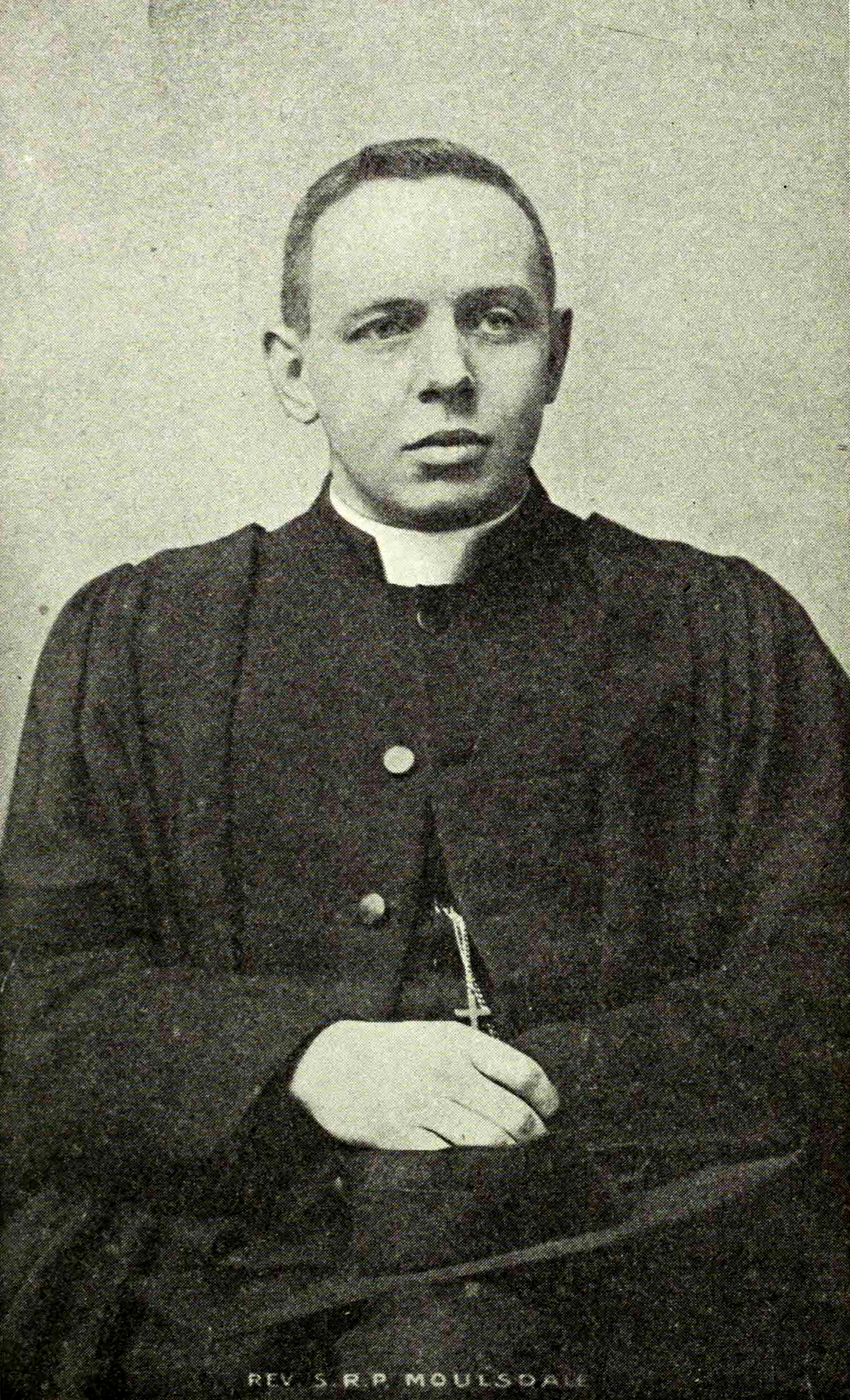
- Moulsdale pictured in the Epiphany 1909 edition of college magazine The Stag

Principal of St Chad's College, Durham
- In office 1904–1937
- Preceded by: Founded
- Succeeded by: John S. Brewis

Principal of St Chad's Hostel, Hooton Pagnell
- In office 1904–1916
- Preceded by: Frederick Samuel Willoughby
- Succeeded by: Closed

Vice Chancellor & Warden of the University of Durham
- In office 1934–1937
- Preceded by: William Sinclair Marris
- Succeeded by: Robert Bolam

Personal details
- Born: Stephen Richard Platt Moulsdale; 18 August 1872 County Sligo, Ireland
- Died: 25 October 1944 (aged 72) Hintlesham, Suffolk, England
- Spouse: Mary Frisewide
- Priest
- Church: Church of England
- Diocese: Diocese of Durham

Orders
- Ordination: 1896 (deacon)

Stephen Richard Platt Moulsdale (18 August 1872 – 25 October 1944) was an Irish Anglican priest and academic administrator.

== Life and career ==
Moulsdale was born on 18 August 1872, County Sligo, Ireland. He was the eldest son of the Revd T. H. P. Moulsdale, an Anglo-Irish cleric who was the rector of Ballysumaghan. He was educated initially in Primrose Grange, Sligo, followed by St Aidan's Theological College in Birkenhead. He was ordained in 1896 and became a curate at St Chad's Church in Everton, Liverpool. Later continuing his studies at Durham University as a member of Bishop Hatfield's Hall, he was granted an MA in Divinity in 1903. Moulsdale married Mary Frideswide, the daughter of Aysgarth School headmaster the Rev. C. T. Hales, in 1908. She died in 1933.

In 1903 he was appointed vice-principal of St Chad's Hostel, Hooton Pagnell, and in 1904 was appointed principal. Also in 1904, he was instrumental in founding St Chad's Hall at Durham University as a sister institution to the hostel, becoming its first principal, which he held concurrently with the hostel principalship. The hostel closed in 1916, with all teaching concentrated at the Durham institution, which in 1918 was renamed St Chad's College. He lectured in Christian worship at the university from 1920 to 1936. He remained principal of St Chad's College until 1937, serving concurrently as Vice-Chancellor of Durham University from 1934 to 1936.

After leaving Durham, he became rector of the parish of Hintlesham with Chattisham in the Diocese of St Edmundsbury and Ipswich. He died on 25 October 1944 in Hintlesham.

Academic offices
Preceded by Sir William Sinclair Marris	Vice-Chancellor & Warden of the University of Durham; 1934 - 1936	Succeeded by Sir Robert Bolam
Preceded by Founded	Principal of St Chad's College; 1904 - 1937	Succeeded by John Brewis
Preceded by Frederick Samuel Willoughby	Principal of St Chad's Hostel; 1904 - 1916	Succeeded by Closed
