= Liberal Catholic =

Liberal Catholic may refer to:

- Liberal Catholicism, a liberal current of Roman Catholic thought that was influential in the 19th century and the first half of the 20th century
- The Liberal Catholic Church, an independent theosophical denomination not affiliated with Roman Catholicism
- The Liberal Catholic Church International
- Liberal Anglo-Catholicism, a party or theological position within Anglicanism
