= St. Alban Theological Seminary =

The St. Alban Theological Seminary was established in Frisco, Texas in 1923 and is the official seminary of the Liberal Catholic Church International.

Students include those studying for holy orders as well as those whose interests are exclusively theological or spiritual. Courses include church history, doctrine, scripture, liturgy, theology, spirituality, counselling, homiletics, and comparative religion.

The seminary's website states: "Absolutely no claim of academic accreditation is made."

As of 2008, the Very Reverend Terence Herrera-LaFavre served as the last dean of the Alban seminary. After 2013, the seminary became the Archbishop Charles W. Finn Theological Seminary.
