= Liberal Catholic Church, Province of the United States of America =

- Classification: Western Christian
- Orientation: Liberal Catholic
- Theology: Esoteric Christian theology, Religious pluralism
- Polity: Episcopal
- Archbishop: William S.H. Downey
- Region: United States
- Headquarters: Ojai, California
- Founder: James Ingall Wedgwood
- Origin: 1919

The Liberal Catholic Church, Province of the United States of America is a province of The Liberal Catholic Church (TLCC), a Liberal Catholic denomination. The majority of its parishes and missions are located in the Western and Midwest United States.

== History ==
Wedgwood planted the seeds for the Liberal Catholic Church in the United States of America, in 1917; and he traveled between New York, Chicago and Los Angeles to assist in ordinations and confirmations.

By August 1918, Wedgwood, Leadbeater and others met in synod in London to agree on a name for all churches under their umbrella; the names Liberal Christian Church (Old-Catholic) and Gnostic Catholic Church were rejected. The name Liberal Catholic Church (Old-Catholic) was adopted in recognition of the church's Old Catholic heritage, whilst being more progressive; and by 1919, there were four Liberal Catholic places of worship in the United States.

The churches in United States became a province in 1919. The Liberal Catholic Church, Province of the United States of America was later incorporated in Maryland on April 16, 1962 following disputes within the early Liberal Catholic Church. Other Liberal Catholic denominations remained united with it as The Liberal Catholic Church, whereas another group schismed into the Liberal Catholic Church International; and both the Liberal Catholic Church, Province of the United States of America and the Liberal Catholic Church International "describe themselves as the Liberal Catholic Church or the Liberal Catholic Church in the Province of the United States and both claim 'official' status as the true church. Both the LCCI and the LCC have similarities and differences, but the critical distinction lies in the succession of bishops."

Through The Liberal Catholic Church, the Province of the United States of America has maintained intercommunion with other Liberal Catholic churches in South Africa, Argentina, Australia, Belgium, Brazil, Cameroon, Canada, Chile, Colombia, the Republic of the Congo, Croatia, Cuba, Denmark, Finland, France, Indonesia, Ghana, the United Kingdom, the Netherlands, Hungary, India, New Zealand, Puerto Rico, Portugal, Sweden, and Uruguay.

In 2018, William Downey was elected the Presiding Archbishop of The Liberal Catholic Church and Liberal Catholic Church, Province of the United States of America (after the passing of Presiding Archbishop Graham Wale in October 2018). Prior to becoming Liberal Catholic, he explored Evangelical Protestantism, Buddhism, Hinduism, yoga and spiritualism, New Thought, and Theosophy.

== Doctrine ==
Since its establishment, the church has continued to practice open communion, affirmation of the LGBT community, and freedom of belief; members are not required to accept its statement of doctrine; candidates for holy orders must assent to the doctrinal statements of the denomination, however.
