= Arnold Mathew =

Old Catholic bishop (1852–1919)

Arnold Harris Mathew
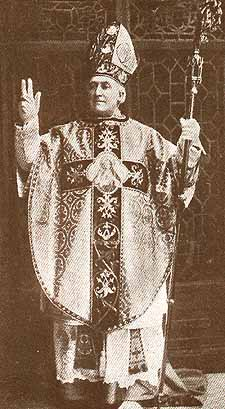
- Mathew's episcopal consecration
- Successor: Rudolph de Landas Berghes, Bernard Mary Williams

Orders
- Ordination: 24 June 1877 by Charles Eyre
- Consecration: 28 April 1908 by Gerardus Gul

Personal details
- Born: Arnold Harris Ochterlony Matthews; 7 August 1852 Montpellier, Hérault, French Second Empire
- Died: 19 December 1919 (aged 67) South Mimms, Hertfordshire, England
- Buried: South Mimms, Hertfordshire, England
- Denomination: Old Catholic, formerly Anglican and Roman Catholic
- Spouse: Margaret Florence Duncan (1892–?, separated 1910)
- Children: Margherita Francesca (born 1895); Francis Arnold Dominic Leo ('Viscount Mathew'; born 1900); Mary Teresa Gertrude (born 1907)
- Coat of arms

Ordination history

Arnold Harris Mathew, self-styled de jure 4th Earl Landaff of Thomastown (Note: The title became extinct in 1833. Mathew claimed that his great-grandfather was Francis Mathew, 1st Earl Landaff. Mathew put forward his claim to Garter Principal King of Arms for the title of 4th Earl of Llandaff of Thomastown, Co. Tipperary in 1890. Mathew just had a pedigree placed on official record at the College of Arms. He did not intend to "definitely determine in the customary method his right to the dignity he claim[ed]" by establishing his right to vote at the elections of Irish representative peers. He has been advised that all he could hope to obtain would be the barren title. John H. Matthews, Cardiff archivist, said in 1898 that the number of claimants to the dormant earldom "is legion". In the archivist's opinion Mathew's published pedigree was "too extra-ordinary to commend itself to an impartial mind." The next year Mathew changed his mind. In 1899, his petition to the House of Lords, claiming a right to vote, was read and referred to the Lord Chancellor. In his petition, he wrote that Eliza Francesca Povoleri was a spinster and he did not claim she was the daughter of a Marchese and a Contessa. In 1902, the Lord Chancellor reported that Mathew's claim "is of such a nature that it ought to be referred to the Committee for Privileges; read, and ordered to lie on the Table.") (7 August 1852 – 19 December 1919), was the founder and first bishop of the Old Roman Catholic Church in Great Britain and a noted author on ecclesiastical subjects.

Mathew had been both a Roman Catholic and an Anglican before becoming a bishop in the Union of Utrecht (UU).

== Biography ==
Mathew was born in the French Second Empire in 1852, son of Major Arnold Henry Ochterlony Mathew (originally Matthews, d. 1894; his son later claimed him to have been 3rd Earl Landaff). Major Mathew was son of Major Arnold Nesbit Mathew (originally Matthews), of the Indian Army, and his Italian wife, Contessa Eliza Francesca, daughter of Domenico Povoleri di Nagarole, a Marquis of the Papal State; through this descent the Rev. Arnold Mathew claimed the title of Count Povoleri di Vicenza. Major Arnold Nesbit Mathew was allegedly the son- born only five months after his parents' marriage- of the 1st Earl Landaff, sent to live with an uncle in light of the circumstances of his birth. This constituted the basis for the Rev. Arnold Mathew's claim to be 4th Earl Landaff, which would not come to be officially recognised. Research revealed the contemporary birth of an Arnold Nesbit Matthews to William Richard Matthews and his wife Anne at Down Ampney, Gloucestershire, which in conjunction with the Rev. Arnold Mathew's father and grandfather having originally been named 'Matthews' rather than 'Mathew', has been considered to cast sufficient doubt on the claim to descent from the Earls Landaff as to render it invalid.

Mathew was educated at Sedbergh School. He was a relative of Theobald Mathew, the noted "Apostle of Temperance".

Mathew was baptised in the Roman Catholic Church. At age two, due to his mother's scruples, he was rebaptised in the Church of England. Mathew "went on oscillating between Rome and Canterbury for the rest of his life." He studied for the ministry in the Scottish Episcopal Church, but sought reconciliation and confirmation in the Church of Rome.

As a Roman Catholic, Mathew was ordained a priest in 1877 in St Andrew's Cathedral, Glasgow, Scotland, by Archbishop Charles Eyre, apostolic administrator of the Vicariate Apostolic of the Western District. Mathew received a Doctor of Divinity degree from Pope Pius IX. He became a Dominican in 1878 but only persevered a year, moving around a number of dioceses: Newcastle, Plymouth, Nottingham and Clifton. He had met Hyacinthe Loyson in France, while Mathew was, c. 1888 – c. 1889, a missionary-rector in Bath where he apostatized in 1889 and sent an announcement to his congregation that having ceased to believe in the fundamental doctrines of Christianity he could no longer act as a priest. He lost faith in the biblical inspiration and in the divinity of Christ. After leaving Bath, he went to Paris to consult with people there. Later in 1891 he was persuaded to "trial" the Anglican ministry and went to assist the rector of Holy Trinity, Sloane Street, London. He was never officially received into the Church of England, neither did he formally leave the Roman Catholic Church.

In October 1890, he changed his name, by deed poll, from Arnold Jerome Matthews to Arnoldo Girolamo Povoleri. Mathew, under the name Povoleri, married Margaret Florence, fifth daughter of Robert Duncan, at St Marylebone Parish Church, London, on 22 February 1892. He was "described as a clerk in holy orders." They had a son, Francis Arnold Dominic Leo (b. 1900), who in light of his father's claimed title of Earl Landaff used the title 'Viscount Mathew' and served as a second lieutenant in the Indian Cavalry, and two daughters (Margherita Francesca, b. 1895, and Mary Teresa Gertrude, b. 1907).

In 1892, when he had reconciled with the RCC as a layman, he at the same time participated in non-Catholic religious functions and officiated at marriages in a CoE church without a licence from the CoE. He stopped using the name Povoleri in 1894. While his wife was listed in the 1897 Royal Blue Book as la Contessa Povoleri di Vicenza, (Note: By 1899 no Povoleri was listed in Royal Blue Book.) he stopped using the title of Count in 1894.

In 1897, Mathew had met Father Richard O'Halloran and became curious about the suggestion of an Old Catholic Church in Great Britain. In 1897, O'Halloran was suspended in the Roman Catholic Archdiocese of Westminster for "reasons of canonical discipline". O'Halloran condemned the censure and created the "Ealing schism". O'Halloran was, according to The Tablet, also suspected of heresy.

=== Election ===
Bishops belonging to the International Old Catholic Bishops' Conference (IBC) had corresponded with O'Halloran since 1902. O'Halloran believed that such a movement would interest a large number of disaffected Roman Catholics and Anglo-Catholics. In June 1906 the Royal Commission appointed in 1904 to inquire into "ecclesiastical disorders", afterwards known as the Ritual Commission. The king issued letters of business after the report. It was expected that the Catholic-minded Anglican clergy, with their congregations, might, by Act of Parliament, be forced out of the Anglican Communion. Persuaded by O'Halloran, Mathew joined the movement and was elected the first Regionary Old Catholic Bishop for Great Britain and in 1908 the Old Catholic Church of the Netherlands (OKKN) was petitioned to consecrate him to this charge.

Mathew's election was to some extent a precautionary endeavour by those anticipating a precipitate action by the Government regarding the Ritual Commission's findings, there were only a small number of Old Catholics in England. However, the King's Letters of Business dealing with the Report of the Ritual Commission received no further attention and no action was taken. The result was that those who had taken part in Mathew's election were able to remain within the Anglican Communion. Added to the natural differences with their former brethren in the Roman Church was a campaign of persecution directed by certain elements of the CoE. In 1898 Willibald Beyschlag wrote, in The American Journal of Theology, that Old Catholic churches sought "federation with other churches having an" episcopal polity. They sought "recognition that they all belong to the one ecumenical church which rests upon the dogmatic and episcopal foundation of the early church, and can, therefore, practice communion with each other." Those negotiations had "no tangible result" in 1898, according to Beyschlag, who did not "think that such a result would be of any great value," because some Anglicans "emphatically desire to be 'catholic', and are at the same time wholly out of sympathy with the Old Catholics." Beyschlag distinguished that the Ritualist Anglican Catholics "are on the way to Rome; the Old Catholics on the way from Rome."

=== Consecration ===
Mathew was consecrated in St. Gertrude's Cathedral, Utrecht, on 28 April 1908, by the OKKN Archbishop Gerardus Gul of Utrecht, assisted by two OKKN bishops, Jacobus Johannes van Thiel of Haarlem and Nicolaus Bartholomeus Petrus Spit of Deventer, and one Catholic Diocese of the Old Catholics in Germany bishop, Josef Demmel of Bonn.

Soon after the consecration, Mathew and O'Halloran were estranged and O'Halloran, under a pseudonym, questioned if the seventeen priests and the eight congregations did not exist in reality but were only a deception and if "the Old Catholic theology teaches that deception of any kind invalidates the consecration" then was Mathew "a validly consecrated Old Catholic bishop according to the teaching of Old Catholic theology?" Unprepared for the position in which he then found himself, Mathew informed Gul that he was himself a deceived victim and "the information given him by O'Halloran was entirely false" and offered to resign but his resignation was not accepted. (Note: "none". The Guardian. London. 20 May 1908. OCLC 21987594. cited by Herzog.) Yet weeks earlier, Mathew and O'Halloran traveled to Utrecht where Mathew personally presented him to Gul. Within weeks, van Thiel wrote that the IBC "had no reason to suppose that we were mistaken in complying with" O'Halloran's request and stated that their "confidence in Bishop Mathew remains unshaken, after carefully perusing a large number of the documents bearing upon this matter," and they "earnestly hope that his ministrations will be abundantly blessed by Almighty God, and that he will receive the cordial support of the British people and Church in the trying circumstances in which he has been placed." (Note: By 1920, the IBC believed "that Mathew himself was responsible for the false testimony submitted in 1908 and, rather than being a victim of O'Halloran, was in fact his confederate." However, in the same year, the CoE was eager to develop friendly relations with the UU and perhaps it was convenient, after the death of Mathew to try to repair relations by "brushing under the carpet" the original "failed experiment?") Brandreth thought that the IBC "exonerated him from personal blame" in this letter. But Anson believed that it "was a polite way of stating that he had been consecrated under false pretenses, though not of his making."

The 1908 Lambeth Conference "deprecate[d] the setting up of a new organised body" and requested that Randall Davidson, Archbishop of Canterbury, notify the IBC bishops about the resolution. This was a protest against the consecration and although it was not publicized at the time, Gul replied with explanations and promised "that in future they 'would take care not to make trouble by encroaching on the order of a friendly Church'."

Arnold Harris Mathew being consecrated a bishop by Gerardus Gul, the OKKN's Archbishop of Utrecht

=== Mission in England 1908–1919 ===
Mathew published The Old Catholic Missal & Ritual in 1909, for Old Catholics using the English language.

In September 1909, he attended the Old Catholic Congress in Vienna, where he sympathized with the Dutch Old Catholics conservative position which opposed the innovations being introduced among the German and Swiss Old Catholics to renounce the Sacrament of Penance (auricular confession), the intercession of saints and alterations to the liturgy, including the omission of the Pope's name from the Canon of the Mass. He proposed the acceptance of the 1673 Synod of Jerusalem's doctrines. Mathew expressed fears that the trend of Continental Old Catholicism was towards Modernism, perhaps because of the growing association with Anglicans and Lutherans, and hoped for a return to the traditional principles of the Church of Utrecht. Moss wrote that Mathew thought they were becoming "steadily more Protestant". The IBC rejected Herford's request to join. "the IBC was uncertain about Herford's credentials" and, only one bishop, i.e. Mathew, was needed for England. Mathew also rejected Herford's applications several times.

Brandreth wrote that for two years Mathew, "with the status of a missionary bishop", remained in full communion with the UU. In October 1909, Mathew assisted Gul at the consecration of Jan Maria Michał Kowalski as archbishop of the Old Catholic Mariavite Church.

A claimant successor to the Order of Corporate Reunion alleged that Mathew was conditionally consecrated in November 1909 by Frederick Cornwallis Conybeare.

In June 1910, he secretly consecrated, without agreement of the IBC, Beale and Howarth, both of whom did not accept or sign the Convention of Utrecht, and Mathew informed the Holy See of these consecrations. Beale and Howarth were suspended.

In August, van Thiel declared that Old Catholics "could not be considered responsible for [...] Mathew's eventual particular attitude or opinions, because he only represents his own clergy and himself in England." Mathew was "in no sense a representative of the Church of Holland in England." (Note: See "none". The Guardian. London. 5 August 1910. OCLC 21987594. cited by Herzog and reprinted in Brandreth.) In October, Mathew defended the consecrations in The Church Times against a critical article in Katholik. (Note: "none". Der Katholik (in German). Bern. OCLC 8739103. and "none". The Church Times. London. 28 October 1910. ISSN 0009-658X. cited by De Oud-Katholiek.) In December 1910, De Oud-Katholiek concluded that Mathew had "given up communion with the other Old Catholics" when he acted against the Convention of Utrecht. He ignored "his duty to inform" the IBC prior to "any consecration", so "that the case may be duly examined and all precautions taken that no unworthy person be consecrated;" he consecrated men who belonged to another Church "knowing that they were Roman Catholics and would probably remain so"; he consecrated alone without need and in secret.

=== Autonomy and independence ===
Within weeks of the De Oud-Katholiek article, on 29 December 1910, Mathew issued A Declaration of Autonomy And Independence from the UU.

Although the Holy See usually did not respond to notifications about episcopal consecrations, in this case, on 11 February 1911, Pope Pius X excommunicated Beale, Howarth, and Mathew. The Times reported on their excommunication and included an English language translation of the Latin language document which described Mathew as a "pseudo-bishop". (Note: In 1145, Pope Eugene III granted the cathedral chapter in Utrecht the right to elect bishops after such had been requested by the Holy Roman Emperor Conrad III and Bishop Heribert of Utrecht. The Fourth Lateran Council confirmed this in 1215. In 1517, Pope Leo X prohibited, in Debitum pastoralis officii nobis, the Archbishop-Elector of Cologne, Hermann of Wied, as legatus natus, (Note: "As papal power increased after the middle of the eleventh century these legates came to have less and less real authority and eventually the legatus natus was hardly more than a title.") to summon, to a court of first instance in Cologne, Philip of Burgundy, his treasurer, and his ecclesiastical and secular subjects. (Note: Joosting and Muller noted that Leo X also promulgated another bull, in which he commissioned that the Bishop of Utrecht, his treasurer and his subjects informed that they were empowered to disregard privileges formerly granted to others and to prosecute offenders while setting aside formerly specified legal process.) John Mason Neale explained that Leo X only confirmed a right of the Church but Leo X's confirmation "was providential" in respect to the future schism.) Mathew sued The Times for libel, on the grounds that the newspaper was apparently endorsing the Pope's characterization of him as a "pseudo-Bishop" who had given aid to a "wicked crime". Father David Fleming testified during the trial at the King's Bench Division in April 1913 that the three were excommunicated on the strength of their own communication to the Holy See.

The trial was described as "tense with laughter over the elaborate and convoluted ecclesiastical definitions." Mathew lost the case. A "material part of the case" about whether Mathew was truthful was the 1889 printed announcement sent to his congregation in Bath. The trial revealed that in 1897 Mathew restated that he had apostatized in 1889 and had circulated the printed announcement but by 1897 had concluded that his change in belief was a mistake; he therefore recanted the 1889 document, in 1897, which during the trial he said that he never wrote. He testified that he was hypnotized in Bath and so the announcement was written without his knowledge. Mathew's attorney argued that publication of the excommunication by The Times in English was high treason under a 1571 law re-enacted in 1846. (Note: Mathew's attorney cited An Act against the bringing in and putting in execution of bulls writings or instruments and other superstitious things from the See of Rome (13 Eliz. 1, c. 2). 1571. and An Act to relieve Her Majesty's subjects from certain penalties and disabilities in regard to religious opinions (9 and 10 Vict., c. 59). 1846.) The judge, Charles Darling, 1st Baron Darling, "held that it was not unlawful to publish a Papal Bull in a newspaper simply for the information of the public", and according to a 1932 article in The Tablet, this was the last time the 1571 act was invoked. The jury found that The Times had not been actuated by malice and the words of the report were true in substance and in fact.

Now an archbishop, Mathew was in contact with people interested in expanding the Eastern Orthodox Church's presence in Western Europe. Olga Novikov, (Note: Novikov, "a well-known figure on the European diplomatic scene" whom Stephen Graham, quoted by Basil, described: "She stood for Russia, she was Russia." She was a close friend of Gladstone and rumored to be a Russian agent exerting a "foreign female influence" on him. She was his source for "information about Russian affairs, particularly in respect of the union of the Eastern Orthodox Church and the Old Catholics of the West." Benjamin Disraeli scoffed her as "the MP for Russia" in England.) along with Baroness Natalie Uxkull-Gyllenband, encouraged and financially assisted Mathew and according to Anson, one of them also introduced Mathew to Greek Orthodox Church of Antioch Archbishop Gerassimos Messara, Metropolitan of Beirut.

Moss wrote that Messara "had no power to do this without the consent of" Gregory IV, in Damascus, "which was never given". According to Herzog, Gregory IV retracted Messara's statement. (Note: "none". The Guardian. London. 12 April 1912. OCLC 21987594. and "none". The Guardian. London. 19 April 1912. OCLC 21987594. cited by Herzog.) "It is hard to believe that an Orthodox Patriarch of Antioch would have been prepared to accept a married prelate into communion with his Church," Anson wrote. Mathew's wife "did not take part in the conference, and it is probable that her existence behind the scenes was again kept dark, as at the time of her husband's consecration in 1908." On 26 February 1912, Greek Orthodox Church of Alexandria Patriarch Photius of Alexandria, allegedly also accepted this union. The Mathew v. "The Times" Publishing Co., Ltd. trial revealed that although Mathew "was originally informed that all were welcome, he was not ultimately admitted" as a cleric into the Greek Orthodox Church of Antioch.

Either Novikov or Uxkull-Gyllenband, according to Anson, introduced Mathew to Rudolph de Landas Berghes.

=== Death ===
Like five of his bishops and several of his priests, in December 1915, Mathew sought to reconcile with the RCC. Mathew wrote to The Tablet within a month:

Although the Orders of the Dutch schismatical clergy were, down to 1910, undisputed in Rome, I make no claim to be recognized as a bishop, or to exercise episcopal functions, or to use any episcopal insignia. I desire to conform in everything to whatever may be the commands or wishes of the Holy See. Neither do I intend or claim even to exercise priestly functions, unless and until, as I earnestly hope, this privilege may be permitted to me. It is my firm resolve, which nothing will ever alter, to obey the commands of the Holy Father, whose word I am perfectly willing to await, and I shall do nothing whatever, whether publicly or privately, in any ecclesiastical matters without the permission of Superiors.

But because the Holy See insisted that he would only be reconciled as a layman and would be obliged to accept the doctrine of papal infallibility and primacy of the Roman Pontiff, Mathew then sought union with the CoE but the Archbishop of Canterbury Randall Davidson refused to give him any position in the CoE. Mathew retired to South Mimms, a village in the English countryside in Hertfordshire, and contented himself with assisting at services in a CoE parish church. He died suddenly, on 20 December 1919, at South Mimms and was buried in the churchyard at South Mimms.

== Contemporary significance ==
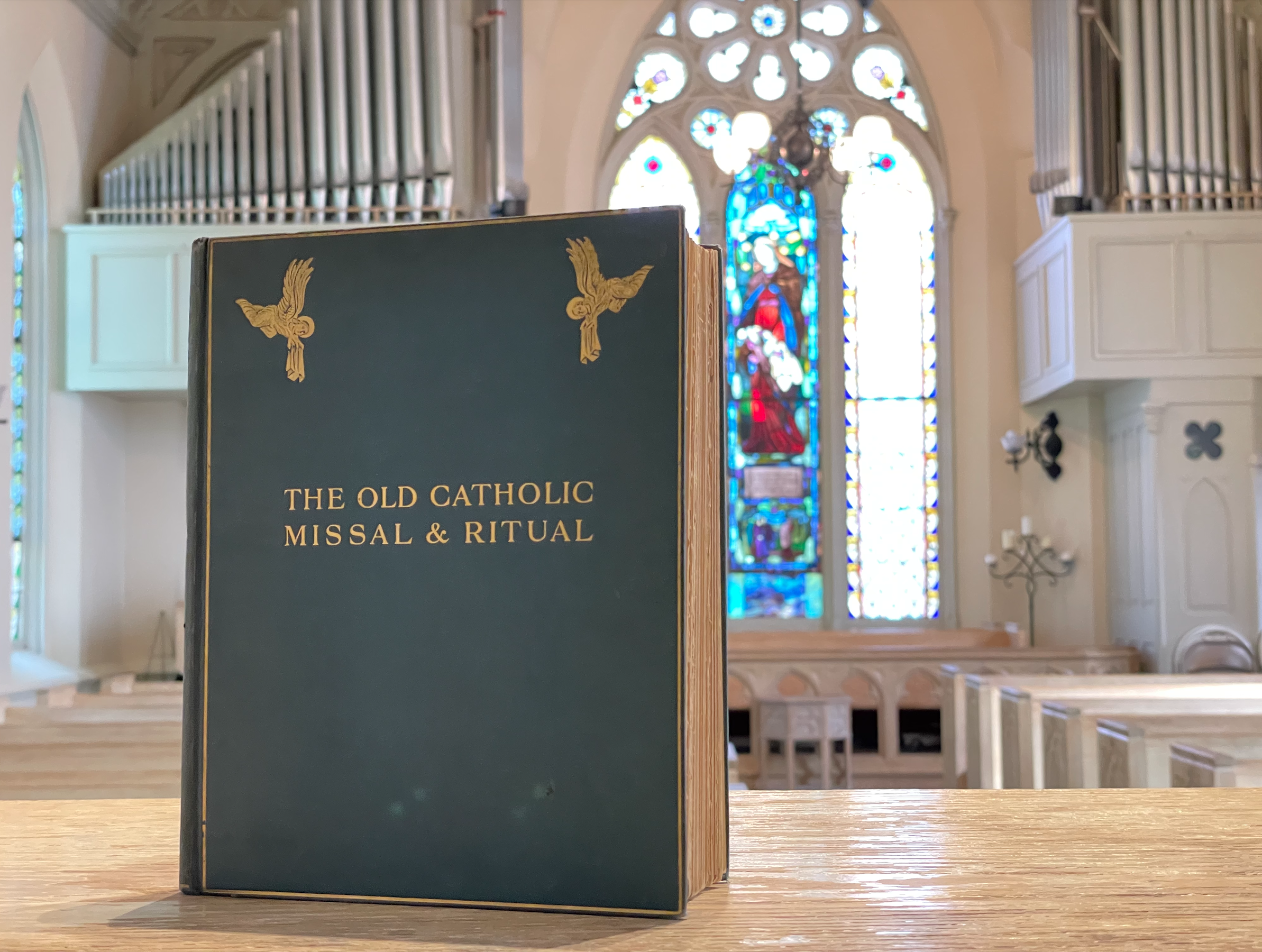
Mathew's 1909 translation of the Old Catholic Missal & Ritual

=== Groups descending from Mathew ===
In 1964, Anson identified several independent sects which derived their apostolic succession through Mathew: the "Old Roman Catholic Church (Western Catholic Uniate Church)", (Note: This did not have a stable name. Berghes used the label "Old Roman Catholic Western Orthodox Church" for Mathew's group. But Mathew identified the group with a variety of labels which included: "English Catholic Church", "Western Orthodox Catholic Church in Great Britain and Ireland", "Catholic Church in England, Latin Uniate Branch", "The Catholic Church in England", "The Catholic Church of England", "The Catholic Church in England, Latin and Orthodox United", "Western Orthodox Church", "The 'Old' Catholic Church of England", and "The Ancient Catholic Church of England". Anson did not identify which label was the actual legal name of the group.) "Old Catholic Church of Ireland", Liberal Catholic Church, "The Church Catholic", "Old Catholic Church in America", (Note: Berghes used the label "Old Roman Catholic Church of America" in 1915 for his group yet "Old Roman Catholic Church" was already incorporated by Joseph René Vilatte in Illinois in 1904 and located in Chicago. In 1917, "Old Roman Catholic Church of America" was still identified as Vilatte's sect in Chicago. While the "Catholic Church of North America (The)", associated with Francis, and the "North American Old Roman Catholic Diocese", associated with Berghes and Carfora, were both incorporated in Illinois in 1917 and located in and near Chicago.) and the "North American Old Roman Catholic Church". He noted that, except for the Liberal Catholic Church, the "sects hardly counted numerically at all." Moss characterized, in 1948, that "there are several sects which claim to derive their episcopal succession from him, which are often confused with the Old Catholics, and which in some cases make use of the name 'Old Catholic'." But, Moss emphasized, "none of these sects is Old Catholic, or is recognized in any way by the genuine Old Catholic churches in communion with the Archbishop of Utrecht."

=== Liberal Catholic Church ===
Anson wrote that, for at least two years, Mathew was "in close touch with leading Theosophists, apparently without investigating the orthodoxy of their beliefs," and believed that Mathew "had no excuse" for not understanding the cult of Maitreya beliefs held by the majority of his clergy. The manifestations of Maitreya included the Hindu deity Krishna and Christ during the three years of the ministry of Jesus. Nicholas Goodrick-Clarke wrote, in Constructing Tradition, that the identification of Christ as Maitreya was Charles Webster Leadbeater's "innovation, closely linked to his assimilation of Christianity to Theosophy." According to Anson, the majority of clergy involved with Mathew were members of the Theosophical Society and the Order of the Star in the East (OSE), and were dismayed when Mathew directed them to separate from these organizations in 1915. Instead, within weeks, they had separated from Mathew and elected Rupert Gauntlett, secretary of the Theosophical Society's Order of Healers, and Robert King, a consulting psychic and astrologer, to the episcopate.

But the "effective leader of the schism" was James Ingall Wedgwood. Wedgwood explored an Anglo-Catholic vocation in the CoE and was associated with the Order of Corporate Reunion prior to his involvement with the Theosophical Society. Mathew ordained Wedgwood as a priest in 1913. In 1916 Frederick Samuel Willoughby, who had been consecrated by Mathew, consecrated Gauntlett, King, and Wedgwood.Leadbeater wrote to Annie Besant, in 1916, that Wedgwood offered Mathew's Old Catholic movement to Maitreya, one of the Great White Brotherhood's ascended masters and holder of the office of World Teacher, "as one of the vehicles for [... Maitreya's] force, and a channel for the preparation of His Coming." Leadbeater took Wedgwood during a festival in Sydney to make that offering. (Note: Also quoted by Anson who identified the festival as the Asala festival. In his clairvoyant Theosophical syncretism of the Asala festival, Leadbeater wrote in The Masters and the Path, that it is an annual official occasion when all the members of the Great White Brotherhood attend the anniversary of Buddha preaching the Dhammacakkappavattana Sutta, commemorated on the full moon of the Hindu calendar month of Aashaadha at the house of Maitreya. He noted that it is not a physical event "but all astral visitors who know of the celebration are welcome to attend it.") Goodrick-Clarke wrote that the LCC was used for "the assimilation of Catholicism and its sacraments into the Theosophical Society" as a subsidiary movement of a diversified second generation Neo-Theosophy which emphasized "the acquisition and practice of psychic and occult powers, notably clairvoyance, explorations of the astral plane, past lives research." Leadbeater promoted an unorthodox esoteric understanding of Christian creeds; (Note: Leadbeater wrote, in The Christian Creed, that "I do not mean [... that] the Church which [...] recites these Creeds [...] known[s] their true meaning [... nor] that the ecclesiastical councils [...] ever realized the [...] signification of the [... phrases] used" because "much of the true meaning" was lost and "materializing corruption had been introduced long before those unfortunate assemblies were convoked." Although he referenced history, he explained that his approach was not scholarly and obtained from neither "ancient manuscripts" nor "theological writers" but obtained from clairvoyant "investigation into the records of Nature made by a few students of occultism" about the "inner sense of the Creeds." He wrote that "three entirely separate ideas" are conflated together in "the words 'through Jesus Christ our Lord'." Those three ideas are: "(a) the disciple Jesus; (b) the great Master whom men call the Christ though he is known by another and far grander name among the Initiates; and (c) the Second Aspect or Person of the Logos." He wrote that both Jesus and Christ "are men of our own humanity however far in advance of us they are along the path of evolution. It is therefore incorrect to speak of either of them as a direct manifestation or incarnation of the Second Person of the Trinity." Jesus "was permitted to yield up his body for the use of a mighty Teacher sent out by the Great Brotherhood to found a new religion." That entity "took possession" of Jesus' body and used it for three years. Helena Blavatsky explained, in Lucifer, that "the same spirit" which appeared in Jesus had appeared in other reformers in other ages; it is the "light of all true religion" by which Theosophists guide themselves along the path to salvation "by every incarnation of Christos or the Spirit of Truth." "'The Christ of esoteric science' is the Christos of Spirit—an impersonal principle entirely distinct from any carnalised Christ or Jesus." While "the Second Person of the Logos" in Gnosticism "is the greatest of all the aeons or emanations from the eternal Father.") he interpreted Christian doctrines through Theosophy. (Note: Goodrick-Clarke described that Leadbeater "wove in many trinitarian elements" into a pantheon. Leadbeater wrote, in The Masters and the Path, that "the Logos of our solar system [...] is a Trinity; he has, or rather is, Three Persons; he functions through Three Aspects." "As the Logos is a Trinity, so [...] the world is [...] ruled by three mighty Officials, who are not merely reflections of the Three Aspects of the Logos, but are in a very real way actual manifestations of them. They are the Lord of the World, the Lord Buddha and the Mahachohan, who have reached grades of Initiation which give them waking consciousness on the planes of nature beyond the field of evolution of humanity, where dwells the manifested Logos." The Lord of the World, in that system of beliefs, is Sanat Kumara, leader of beings known as "the Sons of the Fire, the Lords of the Flame from Venus" who govern the evolution of the Earth.) (Note: For a visual explanation of the spiritual hierarchy of superior beings, see organizational chart in Goodrick-Clarke. The superior beings include a Solar Logos, a Planetary Logos, Sanat Kumara, Mahachohan, and others.) Leadbeater and Wedgwood revised The Old Catholic Missal and Ritual, c. 1916 – c. 1918, by "eliminating references to fear of God, everlasting damnation, the insistence on sinfulness and appeals for mercy," according to Joanne Pearson, in Wicca and the Christian Heritage. Later that year, before the end of World War I, the schism which separated from Mathew's group was renamed the Liberal Catholic Church (LCC) and Wedgwood became the first presiding bishop. (Note: The Theosophical Society's legacy for 20th "century occultism and Wicca has been well documented. It was not, however, from this scion of the Mathew succession, via the" LCC, that Gerald Gardner and his "associates received their ordinations and consecrations.") Leadbeater informed Besant that Maitreya approved of the LCC founding. The LCC "affirms a number of Christian beliefs but injects a Gnostic or theosophical meaning into them," according to Encyclopedia of Occultism and Parapsychology. "The church believes that humans are sparks of divinity (rather than creatures of God) and believes in reincarnation (rather than resurrection). The church also accepts the idea of the spiritual hierarchy of masters, or highly evolved beings who guide the spiritual development of the race. In this regard, it accepts the idea that Jesus is one of the masters, but separates the human Jesus [...] from the master Jesus." In other words, Jesus, "the person known in his early life as Appolonius of Tyanna" in that system of beliefs, is not the same as the entity known as Maitreya in that same system beliefs.

The LCC self identifies as a part of the historical Catholic Church; has doctrines but does not regulate how they are believed by congregants, unlike Roman Catholic dogma; and has membership based on acceptance of a common worship without the profession of a common belief.

In Western Esotericism and Rituals of Initiation, Henrik Bogdan compared the network containing the Ecclesia Gnostica Catholica (EGC) to the network containing the LCC.

Parallel concepts in the EGC and LCC networks
| Belief in invisible superiors | Secret Chiefs | Mahātmās |
| Belief in a world teacher | Crowley (Therion) | Krishnamurti (Alcyone (Note: The pseudonymous author of At the Feet of the Master attributed to Leadbeater or Krishnamurti.)) |
| World religion (Note: Bogdan notes that this is despite disclaimers by both sets of groups.) | Thelema | Theosophy |
| Oath bound body | A∴A∴ | E.S. |
| Fraternal body | Ordo Templi Orientis (OTO) | Co-Masonic Order |
| Church body | EGC | LCC |

== Validity ==
Concerning the validity of the holy orders conferred by Mathew in the period following his departure from the UU, the following have been stated:

=== Utrecht and Roman denial ===
Gul consecrated and commissioned Mathew as a bishop in accordance with the norms of universal ecclesiastical law, nominating and electing him to a title. Mathew declared autonomy from the UU on 29 December 1910, and asserted of canonical rights and prerogatives for the continuation and perpetuation of the Old Roman Catholic Church from Utrecht. He also, prior on 1 November 1909, was allegedly conditionally consecrated for the Order of Corporate Reunion. According to Catholic canon law, conditional sacraments are performed when there are doubts of validity.

In 1913, Fleming testified in Mathew v. "The Times" Publishing Co., Ltd. about the OKKN that, "The Holy See or the Pontiff has never condemned these orders as invalid; but he has never explicitly recognized them." However, Mathew was regarded by the papacy as a "pseudo-bishop."

After Mathew died in 1919, the IBC declared in 1920 that Mathew's "consecration was obtained mala fide and that consequently it is null and void." The suggestion was that the petition for his consecration and its 150 signatories collated by O'Halloran was false in its premise for the consecration and thus the consecration was invalid.

Smit explained that in 1913, "ties of the IBC with Mathew were formally severed", and after World War I, the IBC "distanced itself more from the 'episcopus vagans' Mathew and those ordained and consecrated by him." Consecrations derived from Mathew were not recognised by the IBC. The IBC did also state that consecrated persons and communities connected with Mathew would not be welcome by the UU.

Herzog's discourse was published in Internationale Kirchliche Zeitschrift in 1915. He wrote that a surreptitious consecration, under false pretenses and on presentation of false documents, can not be recognized as valid, even if the rite of ordination had been accurately performed by real bishops.

In 1908, Lambeth had expressed regret over the consecration of Mathew. Lambeth also indicated a desire for a closer relationship with Utrecht. Randall Davidson, Archbishop of Canterbury, and William Maclagan, Archbishop of York, replied to the Holy See in Saepius officio giving a defence of Anglican orders.

Discussions about union with Utrecht had been taking place since the end of the 19th century, such as the conferences of reunion in Bonn in 1874 and 1875 convoked by Johann von Döllinger. Though the Dutch bishops in a report of 1894 still could not decide on the recognition of Anglican orders,it would appear that a desire for closer cooperation on the part of Utrecht with an Anglican desire for the recognition of their orders, conspired to impugn the reputation of Mathew. By June 1925, Davidson stated that the OKKN had "after lengthy investigations and serious discussions" arrived "without any reservation (to recognise) that the apostolic succession was not interrupted in the Church of England" and in 1931 the Bonn Agreement was signed and intercommunion agreed between the UU and the Anglican Communion.

=== Anglican denial ===
Anglican Communion bishops stated in 1920 Lambeth Conference resolution 27 and 1958 Lambeth Conference resolution 54 that they do not regard the Old Catholic Church in Great Britain, its extensions overseas, and "'episcopi vagantes' who call themselves either 'Old Catholic' or 'Orthodox,' in combination with other names" as properly constituted Churches, or recognise the orders of their ministers."

=== Rite ===
Old Roman Catholic jurisdictions have consistently employed the Tridentine Ordinal and Roman Pontifical for the conferral of ordinations and the consecration of bishops. This was the case with the See of Utrecht right up to and some years beyond the consecration of Mathew himself, without any alterations to the ceremonies. Mathew's Old Catholic Missal & Ritual contains his English translation of the Roman Pontifical.

=== Disputes of validity ===
The Old Catholic Church of British Columbia, which claims apostolic succession from Mathew, was, c. 2006 – c. 2007, a probationary member of the UU. (Note: In a letter, Joris Vercammen, OKKN Archbishop of Utrecht, wrote that "the IBC also has to reflect on the validity of the ordinations within your church. [...] we do not expect major problems concerning this issue. [...] we concluded we did not yet receive the official certificates of your election neither of your ordination. [...] send us these documents, as it is requested in the Guidelines of the IBC with respect to the recognition of a church as independent Old Catholic Church of the Union of Utrecht." The OCCBC bishop was told by an IBC bishop the next year, among other issues, both that the OCCBC bishop's consecration was derived through the LCC and that "the line of Matthews succession is there and is not recognized by Utrecht". The IBC rejected an OCCBC request for consecration of a successor bishop, was told that the OCCBC "should be under 'the umbrella' of the Anglican Church", and was informed that the IBC bishops reconsidered the OCCBC's probationary membership and were "no longer a member of the Utrecht Union".)

The Roman Catholic Archdiocese of Quebec, in a public statement, which included an apology made for miscategorizing Father Claude Lacroix, acknowledged the validity of Lacroix's holy orders and stated that OCCBC's certificates of baptism "may be accepted for the inscription of children to First Communion and Confirmation program" in the Roman Catholic Archdiocese of Quebec. It also stated that when "Roman Catholics marry before an ordained minister belonging to another religious denomination, as in the case of the [... OCCBC], their marriage is invalid from a religious point of view."

In 2002, Cardinal Édouard Gagnon investigated the documentation of Bishop André Letellier's episcopal orders and consecration; Letellier was consecrated on 23 May 1968 by Archbishop André Leon Zotique Barbeau of the Catholic Charismatic Church of Canada. (Note: André Barbeau had been consecrated by Charles Brearley, (Note: This person is not found in Brandreth.) who had been consecrated by Matthew Cooper, who had been consecrated by James Bartholomew Banks, who had been consecrated by Frederick Samuel Willoughby, who had been consecrated by Mathew.) Gagnon commented that, "nothing allows me to doubt the validity of episcopal ordination of Mgr André Letellier by Archbishop André Barbeau and that of Archbishop Barbeau by Archbishop Ignatius Charles Brearley, Primate of the Church of the 'Old Catholics' having its seat in England. The ordinations of the 'Old Catholics' are generally considered to be the same as those of Orthodox bishops."

== Publications ==
- Mathew, Arnold H; Calthrop, Annette (1907). The life of Sir Tobie Matthew, Bacon's alter ego. London: Elkin Mathews. hdl:2027/yale.39002034928433. OCLC 564740658.
- Mathew, Arnold H (1907). Woman suffrage. The social problems series. Vol. 5. London; Edinburgh: T.C. & E.C. Jack. hdl:2027/mdp.39015003658088. OCLC 574296800.
- Mathew, Arnold H (1910). The life and times of Hildebrand, Pope Gregory VII. London: Francis Griffiths. hdl:2027/uc2.ark:/13960/t7gq73j0c. OCLC 681821441.
- Mathew, Arnold H (1912). The life and times of Rodrigo Borgia, Pope Alexander VI. New York: Brentano. hdl:2027/uc2.ark:/13960/t4bp00q66. OCLC 682272315.
