= St Chad's Hostel =

Historic hostel in Hooton Pagnell, England

- Preparatory theological hostel
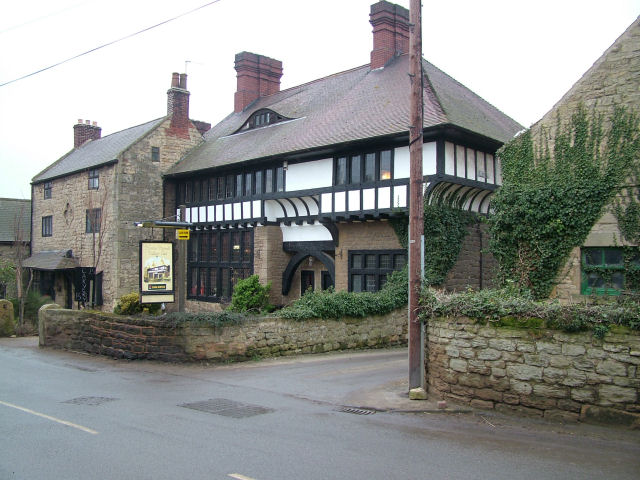
- The 1903 hostel building

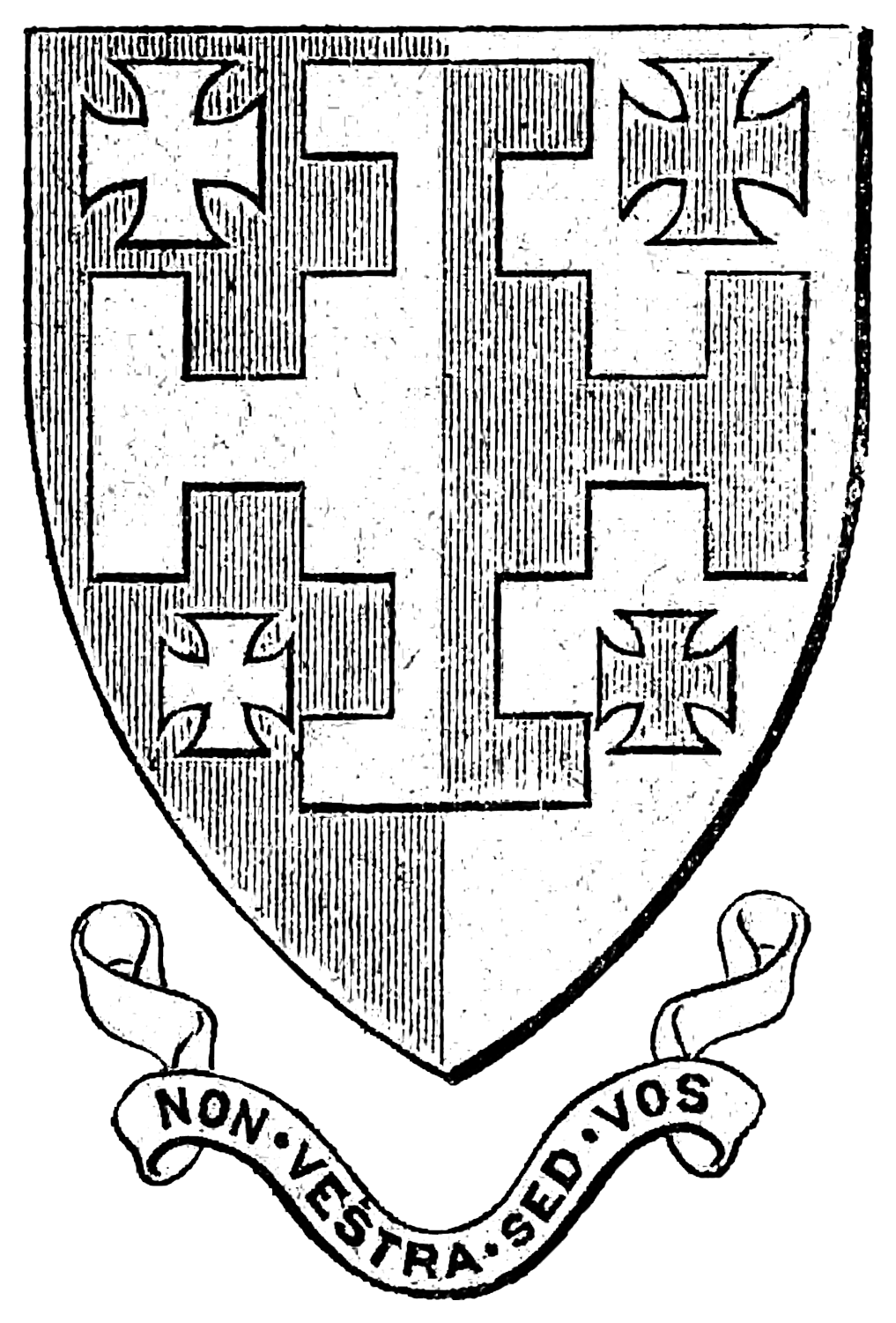
- Arms used by the hostel
- Location: Hooton Pagnell, Yorkshire, England
- Coordinates: 53.568803°N 1.267601°W
- Motto: Non Vestra Sed Vos
- Motto in English: Not Yours But You
- Founder: F S Willoughby
- Established: 1902
- Closed: 1916
- Status: Succeeded by St Chad's College, Durham
- Benefactor: Julia Warde-Aldam
- Newspaper: St Chad's Hostel Magazine (1903), The Stag (1905-1915)

Map
- Location within South Yorkshire

Listed Building – Grade II
- Official name: The Hostel
- Designated: 5 June 1968
- Reference no.: 1192563

St Chad's Hostel, in Hooton Pagnell near Doncaster, England, was a hostel to prepare candidates for theological college. It was opened in 1902 by Frederick Samuel Willoughby, vicar of Hooton Pagnell. In 1904 a sister institution, St Chad's Hall, was opened at the University of Durham.

The hostel closed in 1916, when its buildings were requisitioned as a war hospital. All teaching moved to Durham, where the hostel's sister institution survives as St Chad's College, Durham.

== History ==
=== Foundation ===
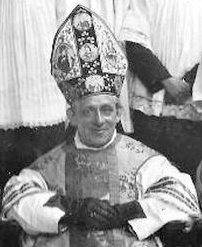
Willoughby (in 1916, as Old Catholic bishop)

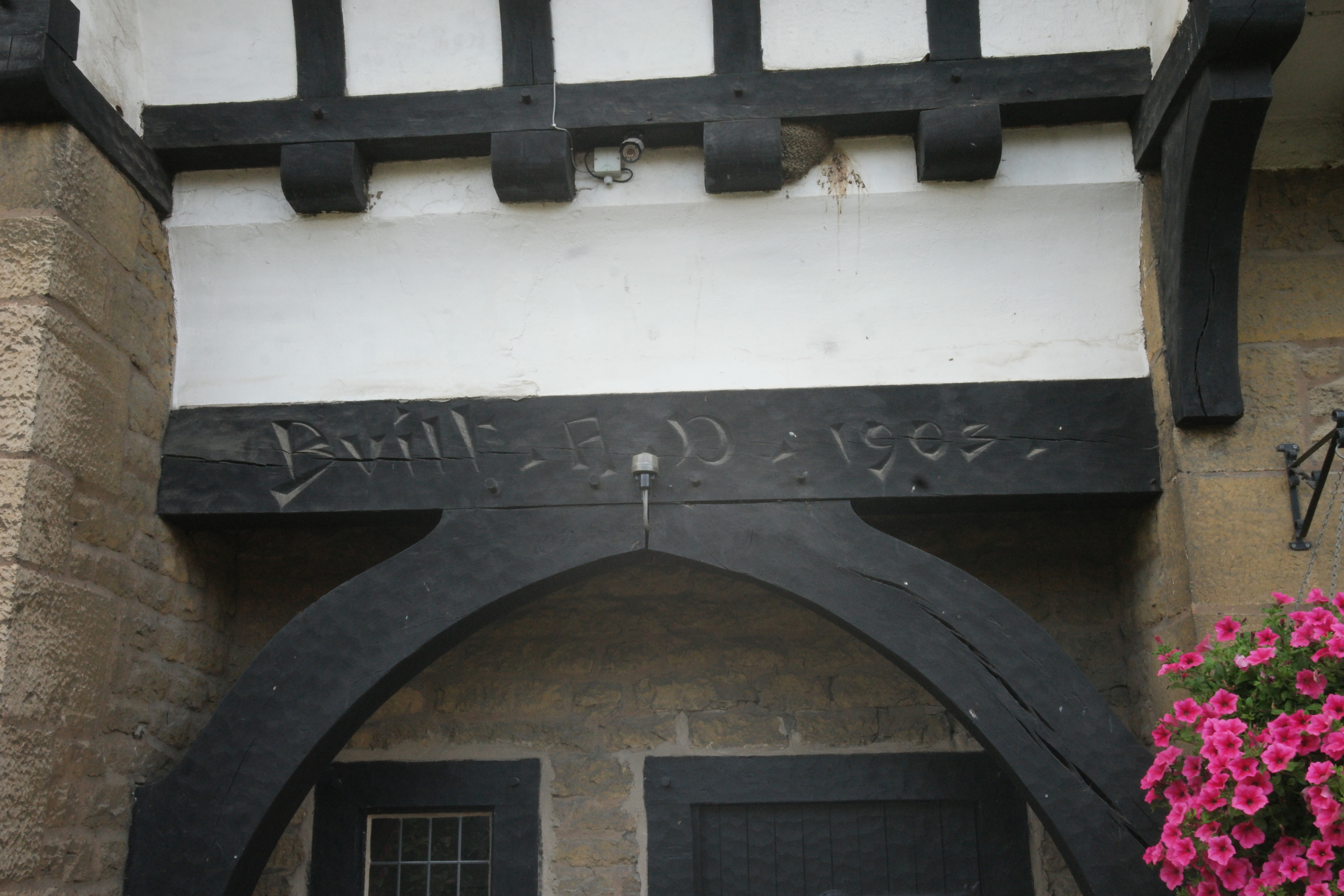
Beam dated 1903 at the main entrance of the hostel building

In 1902 the vicar of Hooton Pagnell, Revd Frederick Samuel Willoughby, opened St Chad's Hostel in the village to prepare men of limited means to enter theological college. In the first issue of the hostel's magazine, Willoughby wrote:

It is a melancholy fact that many men have been lost to the Priesthood simply through lack of means to gain the necessary education. In a recent paper of statistics this loss has been calculated to amount to no less than 2,694 men in the last 16 years. No wonder that we hear almost every day of work at a standstill for lack of workers.

— Frederick Willoughby, St Chad's Hostel Magazine, Advent Term, 1903

In its early years, the hostel had a connection with Willoughby's alma mater, Lichfield Theological College. The Principal of the college, Prebendary Edwin Elmer Harding, visited the hostel in 1903 and was described in the hostel magazine as "our Educational Sponsor before all and sundry". The hostel used as its arms those of the Diocese of Lichfield (the cross potent quadrate of St Chad, surrounded by four crosslets patee) with the hostel's own motto, "Non Vestra Sed Vos".

The hostel received extensive financial support from Julia Warde-Aldam, owner of Hooton Pagnell Hall. Initially students were housed in the vicarage, then, as numbers grew, in surrounding farms. The 1903 hostel magazine records the hostel having 42 students, resident in seven houses - Scott's, Pashley's, Smith's, Seels', Roper's, Harrison's and Vicarage.

In 1903, Julia Warde-Aldam funded the construction of a dedicated building, in the centre of Hooton Pagnell, with room for twenty students and a large lecture room. This building opened in the summer of 1904.

=== Expansion to Durham ===
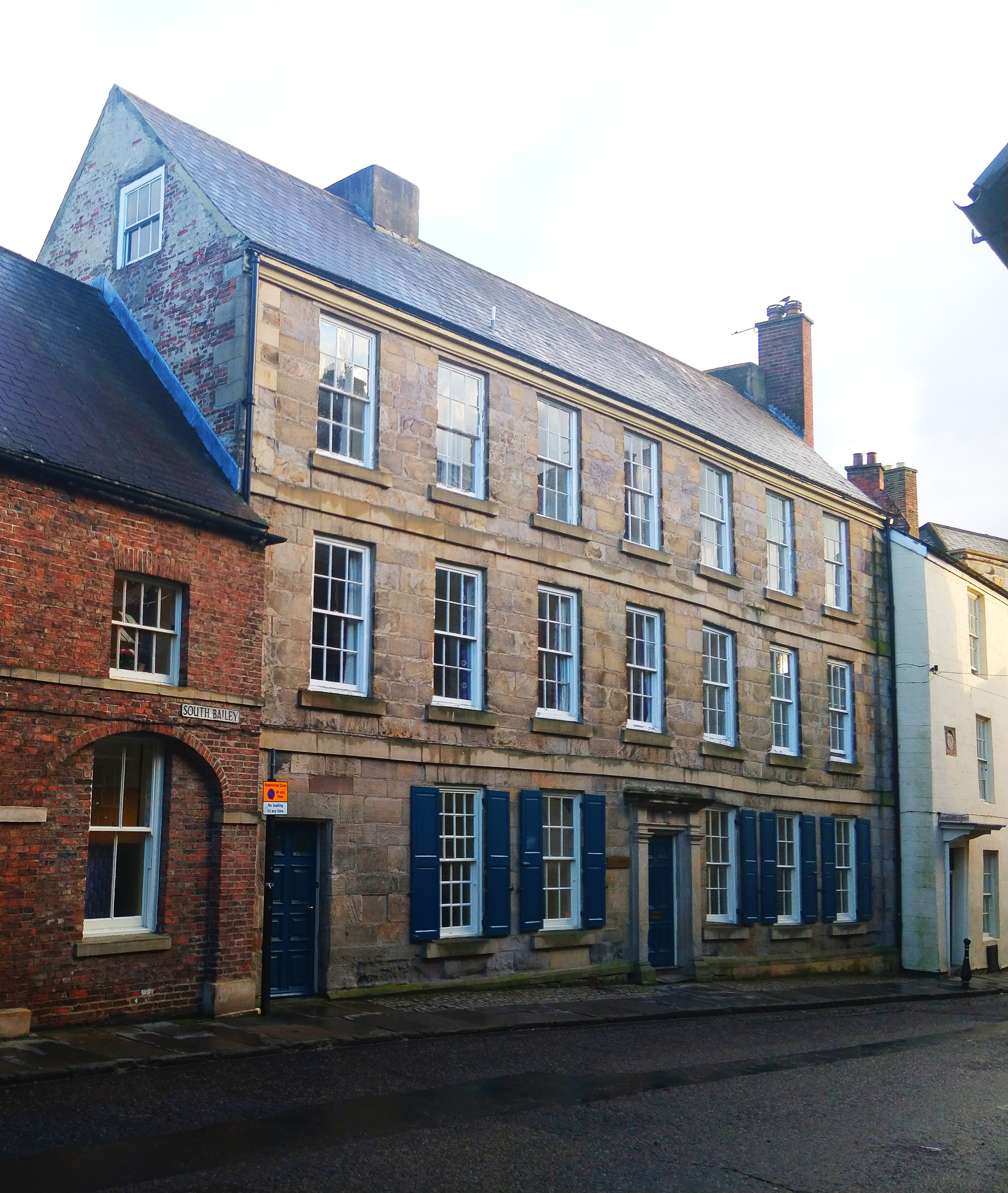
The original home of St Chad's Hall on South Bailey in Durham

In 1903, the Revd Stephen Moulsdale, a recent graduate from Hatfield Hall at the University of Durham, was appointed vice-principal of the hostel, along with Revd Harold Merryweather who also held a Durham MA.

Shortly afterwards, with financial assistance from Douglas Horsfall, a wealthy Liverpool businessman and devoted churchman, St Chad's Hall was established in Durham as a sister institution to the hostel, with Moulsdale as its first principal. The hall was licensed by the Durham University Senate as the first independent hall of the university, and opened in October 1904 with nineteen matriculated students.

At around the same time, Willoughby resigned as principal, and Moulsdale became principal of the hostel as well as the hall. Willoughby's departure was apparently on bad terms; he forbade the new vice-principal of the hostel, Revd Sydney Richards, from celebrating mass in the parish church, and the hostel's 1905 St Chad's Day celebrations took place at the church in Hickleton instead. After Willoughby's departure from the parish in 1906, cordial relations between the church and hostel were restored, with new vicar A H Kearney appointed honorary chaplain at the hostel.

=== Kensit Crusade ===
In February 1911, the Anglo-Catholic orientation of the hostel brought protestors to Hooton Pagnell, when a large number of participants in the "Kensit Crusade", a movement against ritualism in the Church of England, marched from South Elmsall to Hooton Pagnell to protest what they saw as young men being trained to become Roman Catholic priests in the Church of England, as well as against the ritualistic practices of various local clergy.

=== Closure ===
The hostel continued to operate as a preliminary place of study, preparing students to qualify for university matriculation at Durham, until 1916 when it was requisitioned as a hospital during the First World War and all teaching was concentrated in Durham. The hostel briefly re-opened after the war, but the financial problems of running the hall across two sites led to it closing permanently in 1921.

With the removal of the theological college to Durham, the Hostel was bequeathed to the village by the Warde-Aldam family as a village club. It later operated as a pub, "The Hostel". In 2020, a new restaurant opened in the building, named '1903' after the construction date of the hostel building.

The hall in Durham was renamed St Chad's College in 1918, and continues to operate as an independent college of the University of Durham.

== People ==
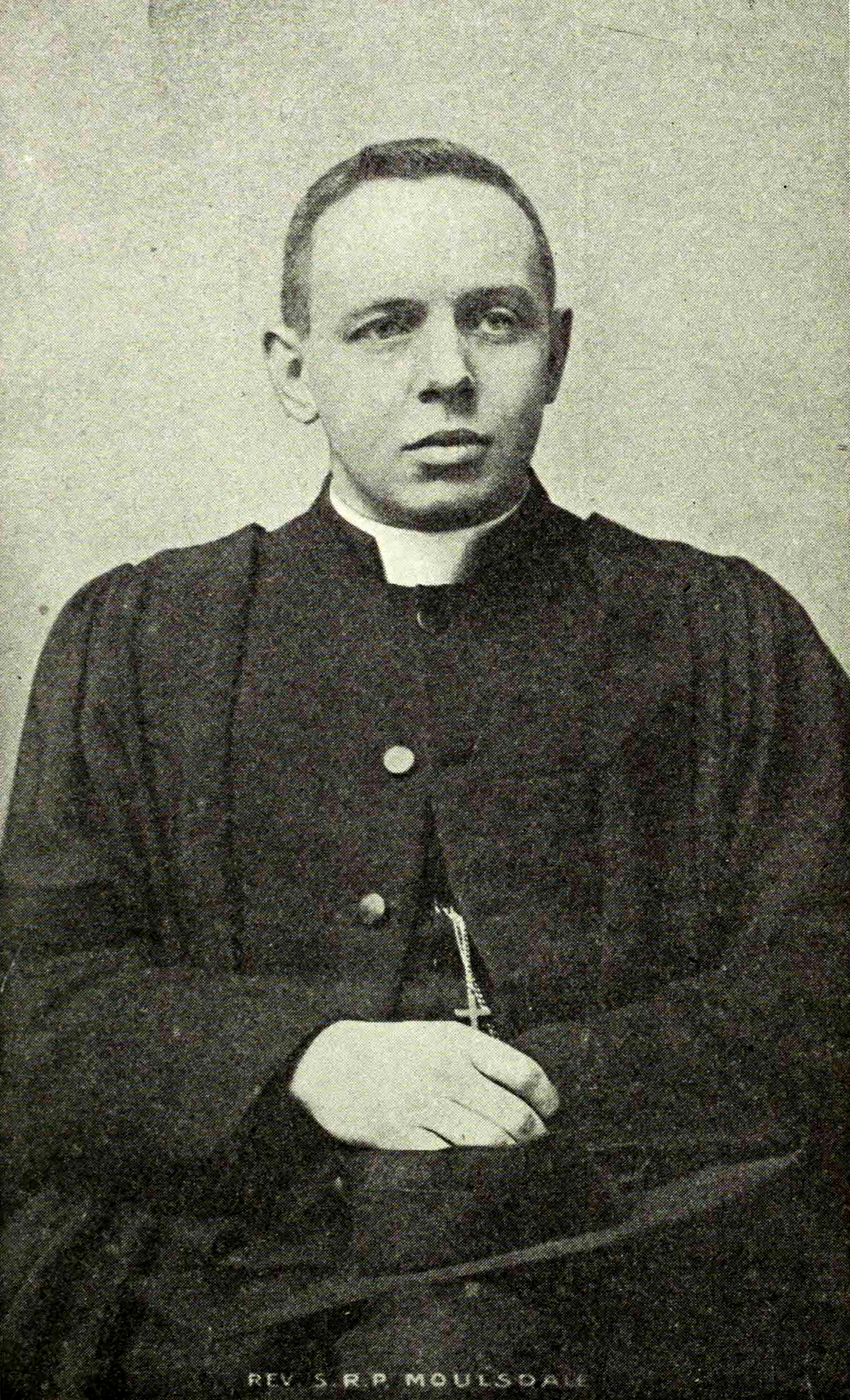
Stephen Moulsdale, principal 1904-closure

=== Principals ===
After the foundation of St Chad's Hall in 1904, the hostel and hall had a single principal based in Durham, with separate vice-principals at each.

1902-1904
Revd Frederick S Willoughby (vicar of Hooton Pagnell)
1904-1916
Revd Stephen R P Moulsdale (also principal of St Chad's College, Durham)

=== Vice-Principals ===
1903-1904
Revd Stephen R P Moulsdale & Revd Harold Merryweather
1904-1905
Revd Sydney W L Richards
1906-1916
Revd Charles E Whiting

== See also ==
- Listed buildings in Hooton Pagnell
