= Listed buildings in Hooton Pagnell =

Hooton Pagnell is a civil parish in the metropolitan borough of Doncaster, South Yorkshire, England. The parish contains 36 listed buildings that are recorded in the National Heritage List for England. Of these, one is listed at Grade I, the highest of the three grades, one is at Grade II*, the middle grade, and the others are at Grade II, the lowest grade. The parish contains the village of Hooton Pagnell and the surrounding countryside. Most of the listed buildings are houses, cottages and associated structures, farmhouses and farm buildings. The other listed buildings include a church and a cross base and shaft in the churchyard, a village cross, a former summer house, and a former smithy.

== Key ==
Grade	Criteria
I	Buildings of exceptional interest, sometimes considered to be internationally important
II*	Particularly important buildings of more than special interest
II	Buildings of national importance and special interest

== Buildings ==
Name and location	Photograph	Date	Notes	Grade
All Saints Church; 53.56593°N 1.26843°W		12th century	The church was altered and extended through the centuries, there was a restoration in 1875–86, and a more thorough restoration by J. L. Pearson in 1885–86. It is built in limestone with red tile roofs, and Norman features have been retained. The church consists of a nave, a chancel with a north aisle, a south porch, and a west tower. The tower has buttresses, a three-light west window, clock faces on the north and south sides, a string course with gargoyles, and an embattled parapet with corner pinnacles. The porch is gabled and has a pointed entrance, and contains medieval graveslab fragments in its walls, The south door is Norman, with a round arch and voussoirs with incised motifs.	I
Hooton Pagnell Hall; 53.56528°N 1.26810°W		14th century	A country house, originating as the gatehouse range of a former medieval manor house, it was extended in the 18th century, remodelled between 1894 and 1904, and subsequently divided into flats. It is in limestone with stone slate roofs, and has an L-shaped plan. The front has the gatehouse on the left and four bays to the right, a nine-bay garden front in the right return, and an extended rear wing. The gatehouse contains a Tudor arched carriage entrance with a moulded surround, a pedestrian entrance with a pointed arch to the left, a window with a trefoil head above, and in the top left corner is an oriel window. The part to the right has various windows, a cornice, a parapet, and a hipped roof. The outer bays of the garden front are bowed, and in the centre is a French window and a cornice with paterae. The main entrance is in the left return, and in the angle with the gatehouse is an embattled turret.	II*
Village cross 53.56730°N 1.26826°W		Medieval	The village cross is in limestone. It has a chamfered square base on four tiered steps, and it carries the stump of a cross shaft.	II
Cross base and shaft 53.56586°N 1.26859°W	—	Late medieval	The cross base and shaft are in the churchyard of All Saints Church, immediately south of the south porch. The base is the older, with the shaft later, and they are in limestone. The base has chamfered corners, and the shaft is square with lightly chamfered corners.	II
Tithe barn, Hooton Pagnell Hall; 53.56475°N 1.26734°W	—	16th century (probable)	The barn was re-roofed in the 19th century, and has since been partly used for other purposes. It is in limestone with quoins and a Welsh slate roof. There are two storeys and an L-shaped plan, with a nine-bay barn, a wing at the northwest corner, and a lower extension on the left. The barn contains a wagon entry with a chamfered and quoined surround and a Tudor arch with voussoirs, a similar doorway, slit vents, and a round-arched hatch, and on the wing are external steps. The extension contains a round-arched carriage entrance and a doorway with a chamfered quoined surround. In the right return is a Tudor arched doorway, external steps, and an eight-light mullioned window.	II
Roadside Cottage; 53.56837°N 1.26747°W		Late 16th to early 17th century	The cottage, which has been much altered, is in limestone with quoins, tile eaves courses, and a pantile roof. There are two storeys and two bays. In the outer parts are two doorways with chamfered quoined surrounds and arched lintels, the left doorway blocked. In each floor are two casement windows, and between them is a blocked window with a double-chamfered surround.	II
Ivy Cottage; 53.56719°N 1.26805°W	—	Early 17th century	The house, which was restored in 1898, is in limestone, with quoins, and a Welsh slate roof with coped gables and shaped kneelers. There are two storeys, five bays, a single-storey wing on the front, and a low extension on the left. The doorway has a lintel with initials and the date of restoration, and most of the windows are mullioned.	II
5 Main Street; 53.56848°N 1.26763°W	—	17th century	The house, which has been extended and altered, is in limestone, and has a Welsh slate roof with coped gables and kneelers. There are two storeys, and two bays, and a later lean-to on the left and a rear outshut. On the front is a gabled porch, and the windows are horizontally-sliding sashes, those in the ground floor with segmental heads.	II
Corner Cottage and Ivy House; 53.56660°N 1.26848°W		17th century (probable)	The house, which was altered in the 19th century, is in limestone, partly rendered, with a Welsh slate roof. There are two storeys, five bays, and extensions on the left and at the rear. On the front is a doorway with a fanlight and a cornice, and to its right is a canted bay window with a hipped roof. Most of the other windows are sashes, and some are casements.	II
Manor Farmhouse; 53.56963°N 1.26727°W		17th century	The farmhouse is in limestone, with quoins, and a Welsh slate roof with coped gables and kneelers. There are two storeys, cellars and attics, and five bays. The doorway has a fanlight, and the windows vary, most having been altered.	II
Roadside farm building 53.56986°N 1.26743°W	—	17th century	The farm building to the north of Manor Farmhouse consists of cowhouses and stables with a hayloft. It is in limestone with quoins, stone slate eaves courses, and a pantile roof. There are two storeys, and it contains doorways, some with quoined surrounds, casement windows, triangular vents, and hatches.	II
Barn, Watchley Farm; 53.56882°N 1.26694°W	—	17th century	The barn was extended and heightened in the 18th century. It is in limestone, with quoins, and a stone slate roof with coped gables and shaped kneelers. The barn is tall, with a single storey and five internal bays. To the left is a blocked doorway with a quoined surround and an arched lintel, to the right is a blocked wagon entry with a cambered lintel, and at the rear is a segmental-arched wagon entry.	II
Wheatcroft House; 53.56693°N 1.26822°W	—	17th century	A house, altered in the 19th century, it is in limestone, partly roughcast, with quoins, and a stone slate roof with gable copings and shaped kneelers on the left. There are two storeys and three bays. On the front are three doorways; the oldest doorway dates from the 17th century, it has a quoined and chamfered surround, and is blocked. The windows on the front are sashes, one horizontally-sliding, and in the left return are casement windows.	II
Falcon House; 53.56633°N 1.26850°W		Late 17th century	The house, at one time an inn, has been altered and extended. It is in limestone, with quoins, and a stone slate roof with moulded gable copings. There are two storeys, three bays, a rear wing on the right, and a rear extension on the left. On the front are a doorway and three-light chamfered mullioned windows.	II
Farm building, Stotfold Farm; 53.55124°N 1.28831°W	—	Late 17th century	A house, later used as a farm building, it is in roughcast sandstone, with stone slate eaves courses, and a pantile roof. There are two storeys and two bays. On the front is a doorway with a chamfered and quoined surround and a Tudor arched lintel, and to the right is an inserted doorway. The windows are double-chamfered and mullioned with hood moulds.	II
Twitchell Corner; 53.56726°N 1.26882°W	—	Late 17th century	A house that has been altered and extended, it is in limestone with a hipped stone slate roof. There are two storeys and attics, four bays on the front, a rear outshut, and a projection with a jettied gable containing applied timber framing. The doorway has a rustic porch, and the windows are a mix of sashes and casements, and in the attic are four dormers.	II
Watchley Farmhouse; 53.56890°N 1.26715°W	—	Late 17th century	The farmhouse was later extended with the addition of a parallel range at the rear. It is in limestone, with quoins, and a Welsh slate roof with chamfered gable copings and shaped kneelers. There are two storeys and three bays. The windows are horizontally-sliding sashes.	II
Bilham House Farmhouse; 53.55232°N 1.26945°W	—	1688	The farmhouse, which was extended in the 19th century, is rendered, and has a red tile roof, hipped on the left. There are two storeys, an original range, a two-bay wing projecting on the left, a porch in the angle, and a rear wing on the right. The doorway has a chamfered quoined surround and a dated and initialled lintel. The windows are a mix of sashes and casements.	II
Home Farmhouse; 53.56869°N 1.26716°W	—	1688	The farmhouse is in limestone, with quoins, and a stone slate roof with moulded gable copings. There are two storeys and attics, a main range of four bays, a two-storey single-bay extension recessed on the right, and a rear lean-to. The doorway has a chamfered quoined surround, a large Tudor arched dated lintel, and a hood mould. The windows in the main range have three lights, they are mullioned, and contain casements. The extension has a pantile roof, and contains horizontally-sliding sash windows with segmental heads.	II
Barn southeast of Ivy Cottage; 53.56700°N 1.26776°W	—	Late 17th to early 18th century	The barn is in limestone, with quoins, a stone slate eaves course, and a pantile roof. There is a single storey, and four internal bays. The barn contains a central door, three rows of triangular vents, and two boarded hatches, and in the right return is a large inserted entry.	II
Lowfold and Lowfold Cottage; 53.56776°N 1.27197°W	—	Late 17th to early 18th century	A house later extended and divided, it is in limestone with quoins and a hipped pantile roof. There are two storeys and a U-shaped plan, with a front range and extensions on the left and at the rear. On the front is a doorway, a blocked doorway with a quoined surround, a French window, and windows, some casements, and some mullioned.	II
Barn, Mappleyard Farm; 53.56815°N 1.26738°W	—	Late 17th to early 18th century	The barn is in limestone, with quoins, a stone slate eaves course, and a pantile roof with a shaped kneeler on the left gable. There are mainly two storeys, and six internal bays. The openings include large wagon entries, doorways, a window, and triangular vents.	II
Range of farm buildings, Stotfold Farm; 53.55131°N 1.28881°W	—	Late 17th to early 18th century	The farm buildings are in sandstone, with stone slate eaves courses, and a pantile roof with moulded copings and kneelers. There are two storeys, and the buildings form an L-shaped plan, with a barn in one range, and a cowhouse and hayloft in the other, and the angle later infilled. The cowhouse contains three doorways with quoined surrounds and Tudor arched heads, another doorway and windows, and in the barn is a Tudor arched wagon entry and slit vents.	II
Forge Cottage; 53.56866°N 1.26750°W	—	Early 18th century	A limestone house that has a Welsh slate roof with square-cut gable copings and shaped kneelers. There are two storeys and two bays. The doorway has a wooden lintel, and the windows are horizontally-sliding sashes, in the ground floor with wooden lintels, and in the upper floor with stone lintels.	II
Stable block, Hooton Pagnell Hall; 53.56503°N 1.26760°W	—	Early 18th century	The stable block was extended in the 19th century. It is in limestone on a plinth, with roofs of Welsh slate and stone slate. There are two storeys, the earlier part has seven bays, and the lower part to the left has four. In the earlier part are quoins, and both parts have round-arched doorways with fanlights, and casement windows. At the rear of the later part are cruciform slit vents, and a figure in a niche.	II
Rock Farmhouse; 53.56916°N 1.26758°W		Early 18th century	The farmhouse is in limestone with quoins, and is in two parts with two storeys, the left part lower. The main part on the right has a roof of stone slate, and the left part has a pantile roof. The gables are coped, with shaped kneelers. In the main part is a central doorway with a hexagonal window above. In the left part is a doorway in a later conservatory, and to its left is a re-set doorway with a chamfered quoined surround and a shaped soffit to the lintel. Above it are slit vents, and on the left return are external steps.	II
Wayside Cottage; 53.56779°N 1.26807°W	—	1770	A limestone house with quoins, stone slate eaves courses, and a pantile roof with square-cut gable copings and shaped kneelers. There are two storeys and two bays. In the centre is a doorway in a rustic porch, and above it is a quatrefoil panel, containing an inner quatrefoil with the date. The windows are horizontally-sliding casements.	II
The Hostel; 53.56874°N 1.26750°W	—	1781	A house extended at the rear in 1903, when it became a hotel for the preparation of candidates for theological college, and it later closed for this purpose. It is in limestone, with quoins, and a Welsh slate roof with coped gables. There are three storeys and two bays. In the centre is a doorway, and to the left is a canted bay window, with a hipped roof over both. To the right is a square bay window, above the doorway is a quatrefoil panel containing a dated plaque, and in each upper floor are two casement windows, those in the middle floor with segmental relieving arches.	II
Coach house, dovecote and houses, Hooton Pagnell Hall; 53.56494°N 1.26690°W	—	1787	The coach house and dovecote were later used for other purposes, including as a water tower. The building is in limestone, with quoins, and roofs of tile and stone slate. It consists of a three-storey three-bay tower, flanked by two-storey wings with three bays on the left and five on the right. The tower has three arched carriage entrances with imposts, and in the middle floor is a round-arched doorway with imposts and a keystone, and flanking casement windows. In the top floor is a Diocletian window flanked by blind oculi, and a dated lozenge-shaped panel, over which is an embattled parapet.	II
Bilham Belvedere; 53.54955°N 1.27386°W		c. 1800	A summer house to the former Bilham Hall which has been demolished, it is in limestone, and in ruins without a roof. It consists of a two-storey central block and single-storey wings. The central block has a vaulted undercroft, quoins, a doorcase with a pediment, and an opening with a quoined surround and tripartite keystone.	II
Barn, Bilham House Farm; 53.55254°N 1.26938°W	—	c. 1800	A limestone barn that has a roof in stone slate and corrugated iron, hipped on the main range, and with coped gables elsewhere. There is an L-shaped plan, consisting of a main range with a central projection, and a rear wing on the right. The projection has an infilled wagon entry with a round arch, an impost band and a keystone containing a doorway and a window. Flanking the projection are rectangular recesses, and there are external steps.	II
Cartshed, Bilham House Farm; 53.55225°N 1.26971°W	—	c. 1800	The cart shed is in limestone with stone slate eaves courses and a pantile roof. There is a single storey, and six bays divided by circular piers on padstones. The first bay contains a horizontally-sliding sash window and a door, the second bay has double doors, the right bay has wooden infill, and the other three bays are open.	II
The Old Forge; 53.56860°N 1.26766°W	—	Late 18th to early 19th century	The former smithy is in limestone with stone slate eaves courses and a pantile roof. There is a single storey and two bays. The left bay is open, with a quoined entrance, and the former workshop to the right has a casement window.	II
Stotfold Farmhouse and Stotfold Farm Cottage; 53.55114°N 1.28804°W	—	Mid 19th century	The farmhouse, later divided, is in sandstone with a stone slate roof. There are two storeys and a U-shaped plan, with a main range of three bays, and flanking projecting wings. On the front are two doorways, one inserted, and most of the windows are recessed casements with chamfered surrounds and mullions.	II
Garden house, steps, wall and gate piers, Hooton Pagnell Hall; 53.56462°N 1.26852°W	—	1912–23 (probable)	The garden house in the grounds of the hall was designed by Granville Streatfeild, and is in red brick and limestone, it has a Cotswold stone slate roof, and is in Arts and Crafts style. There is a single storey with an undercroft. On the east side is a loggia, and a doorway with a surround of moulded quoins, and a Tudor arched lintel. On the south front is a Tudor arched doorway and an eight-light double chamfered mullioned window containing casements. From the entrance front, steps sweep down and are flanked by walls with moulded copings, ending at double gate piers with quoins, cornices and ball finials, and wrought iron gates.	II
Gateway and walls, Hooton Pagnell Hall; 53.56543°N 1.26879°W		1914–20	The entrance to the grounds of the hall was designed by Granville Streatfeild in Arts and Crafts style, and is in limestone with roofs of Cotswolds stone slate. It has a segmental arch with a moulded surround, above which is a corbel table, and it is flanked by tall square piers with cornices, pyramidal caps, and lead finials. The wing walls are angled, on the left leading to a square turret containing a pedestrian entrance with a segmental arch, and a doorway with a pointed arch. Above is a window with an ogee arch, and a pyramidal roof with a finial. On the right, the wall leads to an octagonal tower that has paired ogee-headed windows and a hipped roof with a finial. Beyond this, the wall continues along the road, and behind it, at the south end, is a small garden cloakroom.	II
