= Hooton Pagnell =

Village and civil parish in South Yorkshire, England

Coordinates: 53.5674°N 1.2688°W

- Village and civil parish
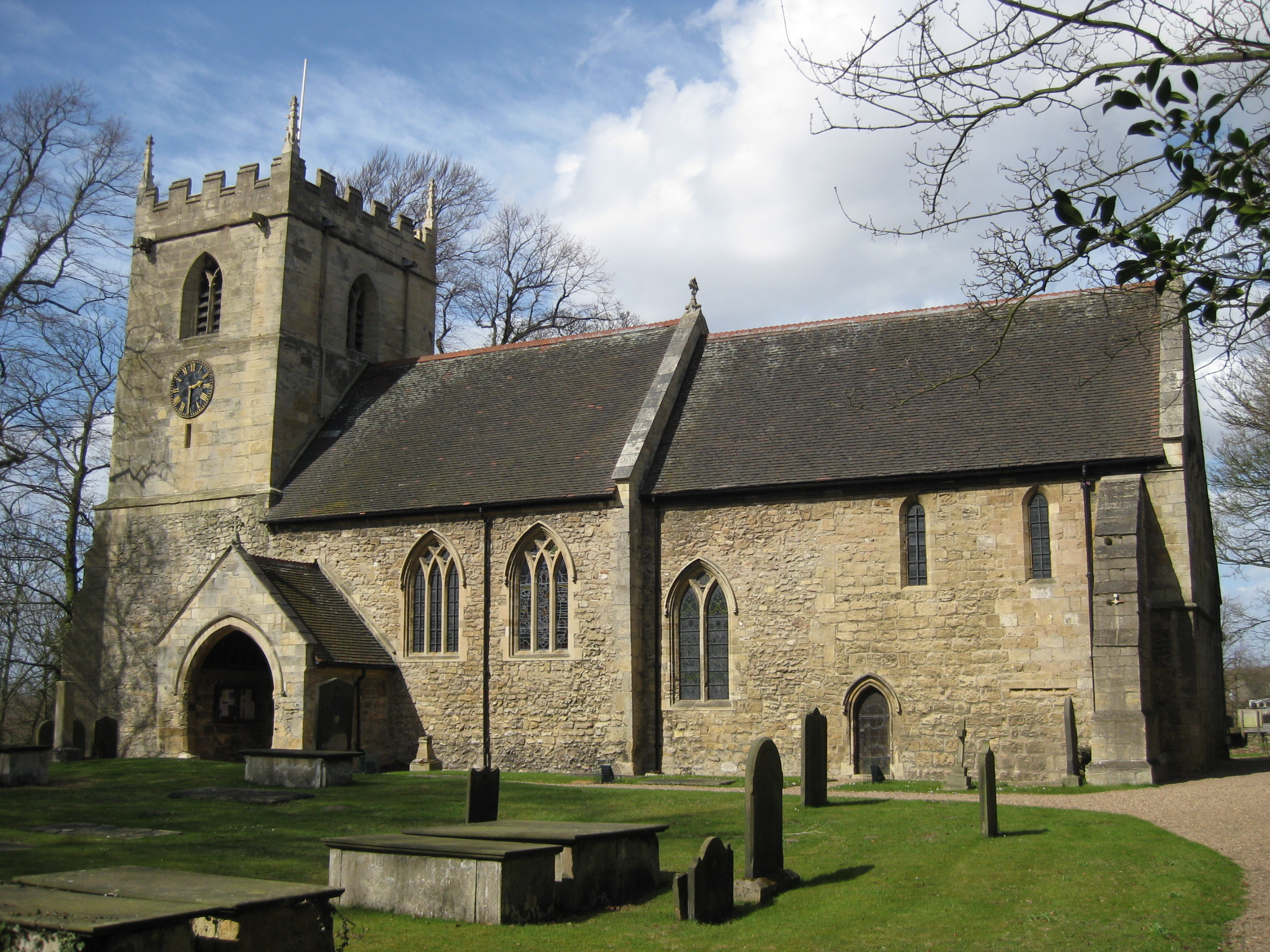
- All Saints Church

- Location within Borough of Doncaster Location within South Yorkshire
- Population: 201 (2011 Census)
- OS grid reference: SE452078
- Civil parish: Hooton Pagnell
- Metropolitan borough: Doncaster
- Metropolitan county: South Yorkshire
- Region: Yorkshire and the Humber
- Country: England
- Sovereign state: United Kingdom
- Post town: Doncaster
- Postcode district: DN5
- Dialling code: 01977
- Police: South Yorkshire
- Fire: South Yorkshire
- Ambulance: Yorkshire
- UK Parliament: Doncaster North

Hooton Pagnell is a village and civil parish in the Metropolitan Borough of Doncaster in South Yorkshire, England, on the border with West Yorkshire. It lies on the B6422 road, between Brodsworth and South Elmsall and is at an elevation of around 78 metres (256 ft) above sea level. It had a population of 211 at the 2001 Census, reducing slightly to 201 at the 2011 Census. The name of the village derives from Ralph de Paganel (sometimes spelled Paynell), a Norman who was a tenant-in-chief in Yorkshire named in the Domesday Book and an extensive landowner.

== History ==
The first recorded mention of Hooton Pagnell is found in Domesday Book, where it is called "Hotone" ("The Town on the Hill" or "The High Dwelling Place"). "In Hotone and Bileham Earl Edwin had one manor of ten carucetes for geld, and ten ploughs may be there.. . . . . . . . . In the time of King Edward it was worth eight pounds, now one hundred shillings." The 200 acres (81 ha), that was in 1086 the extent of the cultivated land in Hooton, were given to Robert, Count of Mortain. He in turn sublet the land to Richard de Surdeval, a Norman knight.

The village was variously called "Hoton", "Howton", "Hutton", the second part of the name being added during the time of the Paganals, a distinguished Norman family into whose hands the manor passed towards the end of the 11th Century. The second part of the name is variously spelt - "Paynel", “Painell", "Pannell", "Pagnell". Hence, "Hooton Pagnell" - "The High Dwelling Place of the Paynels'.

The village received a Royal Charter in 1254 entitling it to hold a market on Thursdays and an annual three-day fair. A butter cross was built, the base of which survives, but the market and fair soon ceased. However the fair has since been revived and is held very first Sunday in July. The ownership of Hooton remained in the hands of the Paganels and their heirs till the reign of Edward IV through the names of Paganel, and through marriage, Luterel and Hilton.

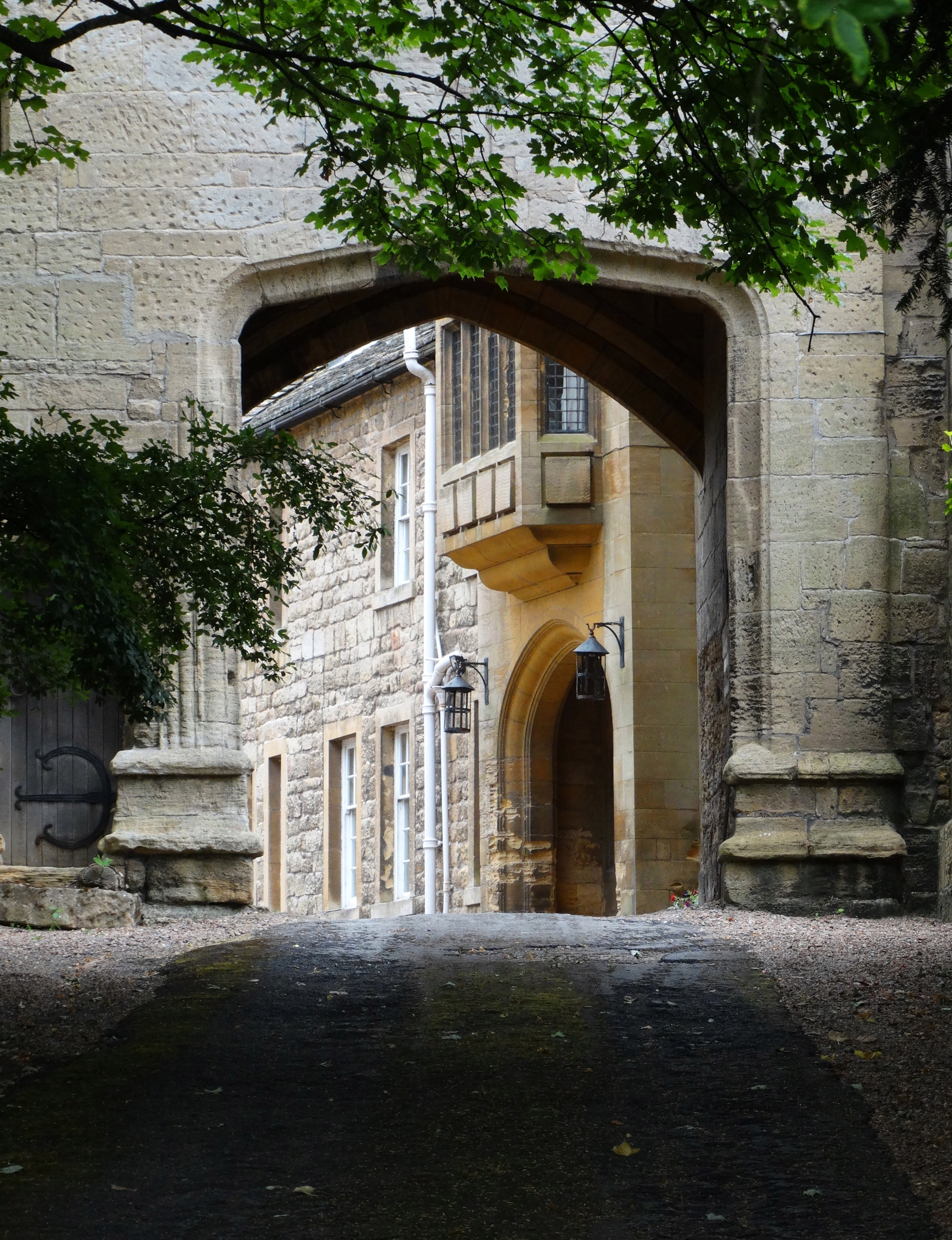
Hooton Pagnell Hall

=== Hooton Pagnell Hall and the Estate ===
Much of the property in the village belongs to the estate of Hooton Pagnell Hall, which has been in the family of former Lord Mayor of London Sir Patience Warde since the 17th century. Before that it was owned by Sir Richard Hutton of Goldsborough Hall who bought the estate in 1605. Hutton's descendant Col Robert Byerley, of Byerley Turk fame, sold the hall and estate to Sir Patience Warde in 1703. With increased wealth, the Hall was extensively restored in Victorian times: following the sale of many large properties to meet death duties, the estate is now owned by a family trust. Mary Betty Norbury received the Hooton Pagnell estate as a gift from her father, Col William St Andrew Warde-Aldam, in 1952, and she and her husband assumed the surname of Warde-Norbury by Royal Licence in 1958.

=== Hooton Pagnell Church ===
Close to the hall is the parish church of All Saints, a Grade I listed Norman square-towered church. Originally built in Norman times, the church was white-washed during the Reformation. With the revival of ritual as a result of the Oxford Movement, the church was restored to a more High Church style in the 1870s by the owner of the estate, Julia Warde-Aldam, who also restored the church in the neighbouring village of Frickley. The Warde-Aldams' wealth was based on land-ownership but was boosted significantly by the exploitation of coal reserves in the estates land with the sinking of Frickley colliery, located in South Elmsall, West Yorkshire.

=== St Chad's Hostel ===
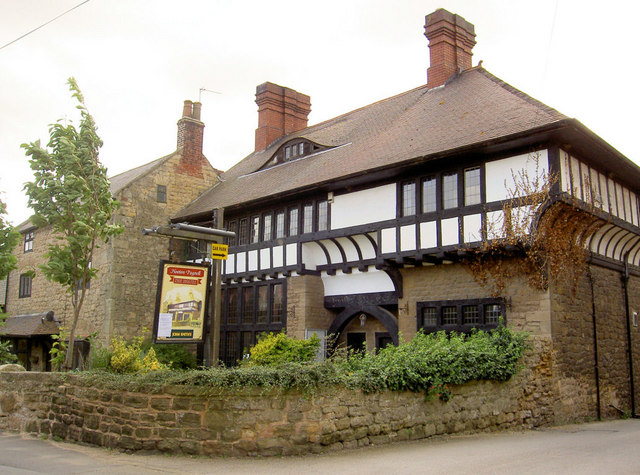
St Chad's Hostel, 1904, now The Hostel pub

In 1902 the vicar of Hooton Pagnell, Revd Frederick Samuel Willoughby, opened St Chad's Hostel in the village to prepare men of limited means to enter theological college. He was supported in this by Lady of the Manor Julia Warde-Aldam. Initially students were housed in the vicarage, then, as numbers grew, in surrounding farms; before a dedicated purpose-built hostel, funded by Warde-Aldam, was opened in 1904.

In 1904, further financial support from Liverpool businessman Douglas Horsfall made it possible to establish St Chad's Hall in Durham as a sister institution to the hostel.

The hostel continued to operate as a preliminary place of study until 1916, when it was requisitioned as a war hospital and all teaching was moved to Durham. The hostel briefly re-opened after the war, but closed permanently in 1921.

The hostel building was bequeathed to the village by the Warde-Aldam family as a village club, and now operates as a pub, "The Hostel".

== Politics ==
Being an estate village, politics were traditionally dominated by the local landowners and by the church since Hooton Pagnell has its own vicar up to 1979. As the economics of the village have changed, it has become a commuter village in one of the very few Conservative wards in the Metropolitan Borough of Doncaster. The Village lies in the constituency of Doncaster North and the local MP is Ed Miliband.

== See also ==
- Listed buildings in Hooton Pagnell
