= Liberal Rite =

Liturgical rite of Liberal Catholic movement

The Liberal Rite is a liturgical rite found within the Liberal Catholic Church.

== Development ==
The Liberal Rite was composed by Bishop James I. Wedgwood, with Bishop C.W. Leadbeater assisting on the collects, psalms, canticles, and readings.

In explaining how the Liberal Rite was developed, Bishop Wedgwood states:

"We set to work to eliminate the many features which from our point of view disfigure and weaken the older liturgies. References to fear of God, to His wrath and to everlasting damnation were taken out, also the constant insistence on the sinfulness and worthlessness of man and the frequent appeals for mercy. The services were made as clear and free from repetition in their structural sequence as possible. And every opportunity was given to the congregation to join in the worship with all the resources of mind and will and emotion and self-dedication they were able to command. The sentiments put into the mouth of the worshiper are such as those who are filled with the spirit of devotion and service can honestly and sincerely utter.... It stresses the idea of co-operation with the Divine Father rather than that of supplication, and being outward-turned in the service of God and His world soon enables a man to realize something of the boundless resources of his own being. They are his by right and not simply by grace."

== Publication ==
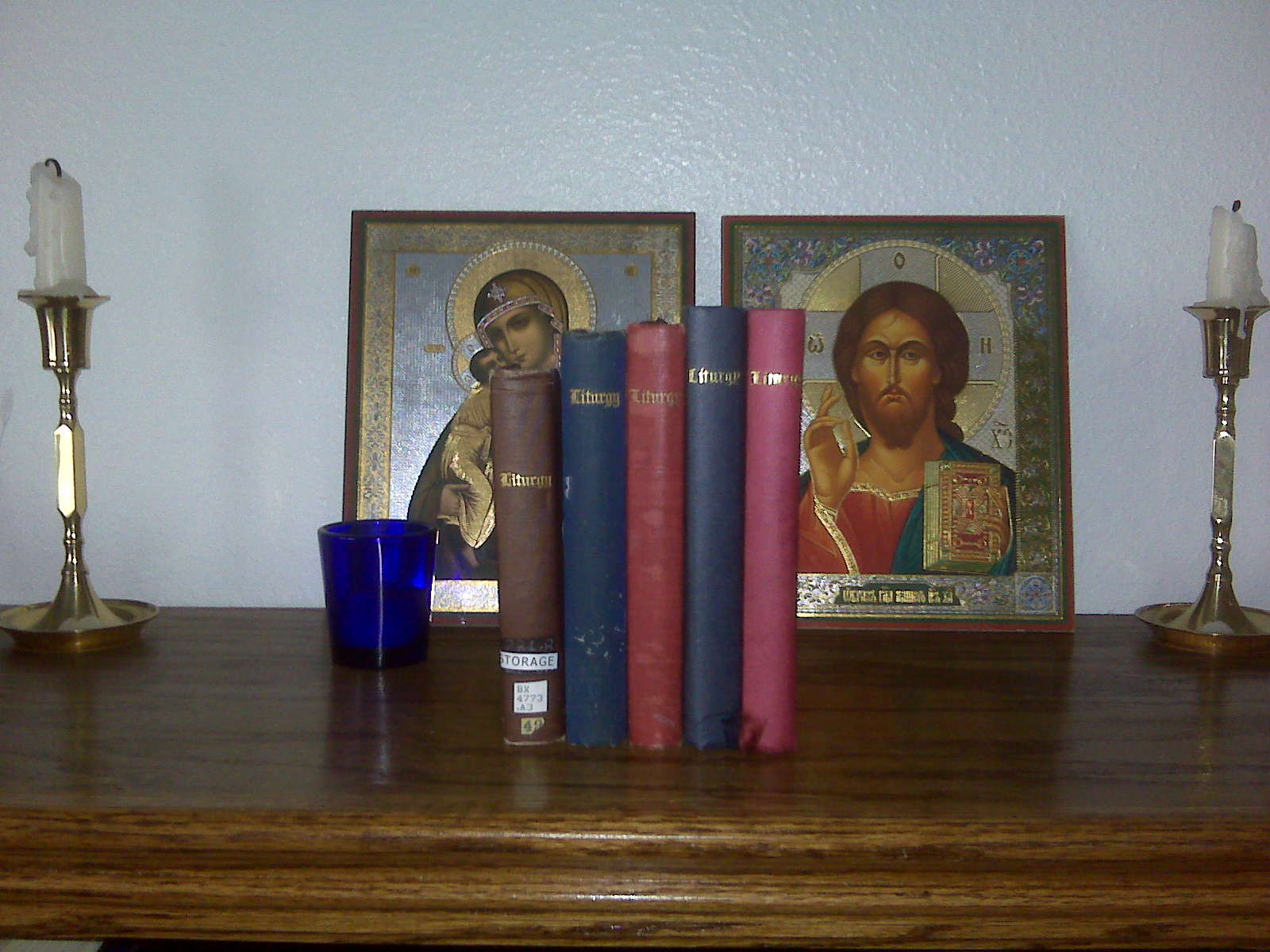
LCC Liturgy Books 1st through 5th editions.

A total of five editions of the Rite exist today.

- 1917 - Private printing booklet with the Liturgy of the Holy Mass (18 pgs).
- 1918 - Two booklets containing the Liturgy of the Mass, a Form for the Administration of Holy Communion, Form for the Communion of the Sick, the Order of Vespers and the Benediction of the Most Holy Sacrament.
- 1919 - The Liturgy was first published in its entirety. - Authorized by Bp. Wedgwood. Reprinted by St. Alban Press, San Diego, CA.
- 1924 - 2nd edition published. - Authorized by Bp. Leadbeater
- 1942 - 3rd edition published. - Authorized by Bp. Pigott
  - 1961 - 3rd edition published in Spanish (Partial). - Authorized by Bp. Vreede under Bp. Ballesteros
    - 1987 - 3rd edition reprint by the LCCI. - Authorized by Bp. Neth
    - 2002 - 3rd edition reprint by the LCCI. - Authorized by Bp. Finn
    - 2010 - 3rd edition published in Spanish(Complete). - Authorized by Bp. Bekken
    - 2017 - 3rd edition reprinted by the St. Alban Press. - Authorized by Bp. Bekken.
- 1967 - 4th edition published by the LCC (old synod). - Authorized by Bp. Sykes
- 1983 - 5th edition published by the LCC (old synod). - Authorized by Bp. Von Krusenstierna

In 2004 the GES of the LCC (new synod) announced that they would issue a new 6th edition of the Liturgy which would "introduce invocations to Our Lady at the Ordination...of the Holy Orders", and introduce gender inclusive language. Also to be changed will be an invocation to Our Lady at the Healing Service, and the Shorter Form of the Eucharist will be taken from the 1967 edition.

== See also ==
- Tridentine Mass
- Divine Liturgy
- Missal
- Breviary
