= Robert Bolam =

British medical doctor, academic and British Army officer

Sir Robert Alfred Bolam (1871 – 28 April 1939) was a British medical doctor, academic and British Army officer. He served as Chair of Council of the British Medical Association from 1920 to 1927. He was President of the British Association of Dermatologists 1933-34. He was Vice-Chancellor of Durham University from 1936 to 1937.

== Early life ==
Bolam was born in 1871 to John Bolam, a chemist. He was educated at Rutherford College in Newcastle upon Tyne, England.

Academic offices
Preceded by The Revd Dr Stephen Moulsdale	Vice-Chancellor & Warden of the University of Durham; 1936 - 1937	Succeeded by Sir James Fitzjames Duff & Lord Eustace Percy
