= William Sinclair Marris =

British civil servant, colonial administrator and classical scholar

Sir William Sinclair Marris KCSI, KCIE
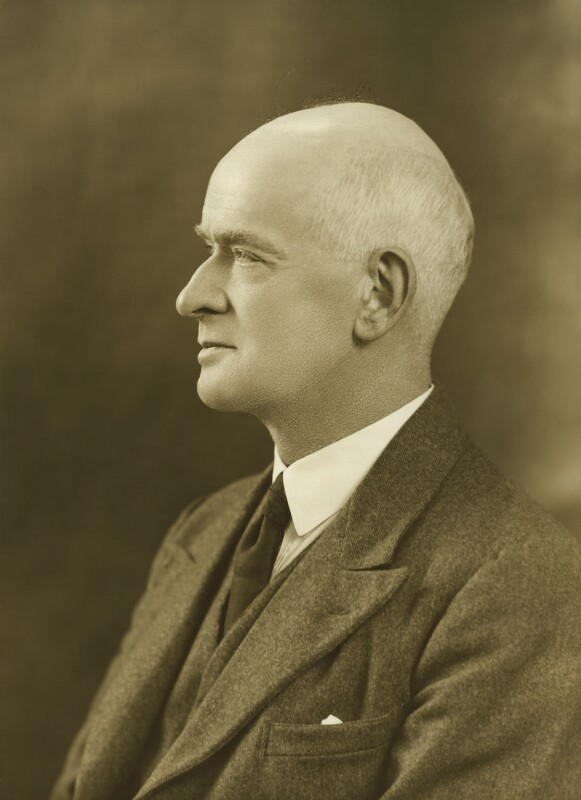
- Photographic portrait, bromide print, by Bassano Ltd. (13 November 1933)

Governor of Assam
- In office 1921–1922

Governor of United Provinces
- In office 1922–1928

Member of Council of India
- In office 1928–1929

Personal details
- Born: 9 October 1873 Aston, Warwickshire, England
- Died: 12 December 1945 (aged 72) Cirencester, Gloucestershire, England

Sir William Sinclair Marris, KCSI, KCIE (9 October 1873 – 12 December 1945) was a British civil servant, colonial administrator, and classical scholar. He was a member of the Indian Civil Service during the British Raj, and later became Vice-Chancellor of the University of Durham.

== Education and life ==
Born on 9 October 1873, Marris was educated at Wanganui Collegiate School and Canterbury College in New Zealand, and later studied at Christ Church, Oxford. He passed first in the Indian Civil Service (open) examination in 1895.

He married Eleanor Mary Fergusson, in 1905, who died a year later in 1906. After retirement from the Indian Civil Service, Marris returned to Northern England and remarried to Elizabeth Wilford in 1934, whom he had known from his childhood in New Zealand.

In 1921, he laid Murari Chand College's foundation stone in Thackeray Hills, Sylhet alongside Syed Abdul Majid.

Following his return from India he resigned as a member of the Council of the Secretary of India to take a principalship at Armstrong College in Newcastle upon Tyne, and he was Vice-Chancellor of Durham University from 1932 to 1934. During this period, he published translations of Greek and Roman Literature. He retired in 1937 and settled in Cirencester, Gloucestershire, where at Dollar House he died on 12 December 1945.

== Indian Civil Service ==
Sir William Sinclair Marris served in the Indian Civil Service in several positions

- Assistant Magistrate, U.P. 1896
- Under Secretary to Government, U.P. 1899
- Under Secretary to Government of India. 1901
- Deputy Secretary to Government of India, 1904
- Magistrate and Collector; Aligarh, 1910
- Member Executive Committee Coronation Durbar, 1912
- Acting Secretary to Government of India, Home Department, 1913
- Inspector-General of Police, U.P. 1916
- Joint Secretary to Government of India 1919–21
- Reforms Commissioner, 1919–20
- Governor of Assam, 1921–22
- Governor of the United Provinces of Agra and Oudh, 1922–28
- Member of Council of India, 1928–29

== Publications ==
Sir William Marris authored and translated several publications including

- The Odes of Horace. By Horace, (translated Sir William Marris). Published London, New York [etc.]: H.Frowde, 1912 (books I-IV and the Saecular hymn translated into English verse)
- The Iliad of Homer. By Homer, (translated Sir William Marris). Published London, New York [etc.]: Oxford University Press, 1934
- The Odyssey of Homer. By Homer, (translated Sir William Marris). Published London, New York [etc.]: Oxford University Press, 1925
- Catullus. By Catallus, (translated Sir William Marris). Published Oxford: Clarendon Press, 1924
- India: the political problem By Sir William Marris. Published Nottingham, 1930?

== Vice-Chancellor of the University of Durham ==
From 1929 to 1937, Marris was Principal of Armstrong College in the Newcastle division of the University of Durham (now Newcastle University), in which role he held the position of Vice-Chancellor of the University of Durham from 1932 to 1934.

Academic offices
Preceded by The Revd Prof Henry Ellershaw	Vice-Chancellor of the University of Durham; 1932–1934	Succeeded by The Revd Stephen Moulsdale
