= Liberal Catholic Church =

Christian groups

The names Liberal Catholic Church (LCC) and Liberal Catholic movement are used to refer to a number of separate Independent Catholic denominations throughout the world descending from James Ingall Wedgwood and Charles Webster Leadbeater; Liberal Catholic churches combine Roman Catholic and Old Catholic sacramental practices with freedom of belief, and in particular openness to theosophical ideas.

== History ==
=== Background ===
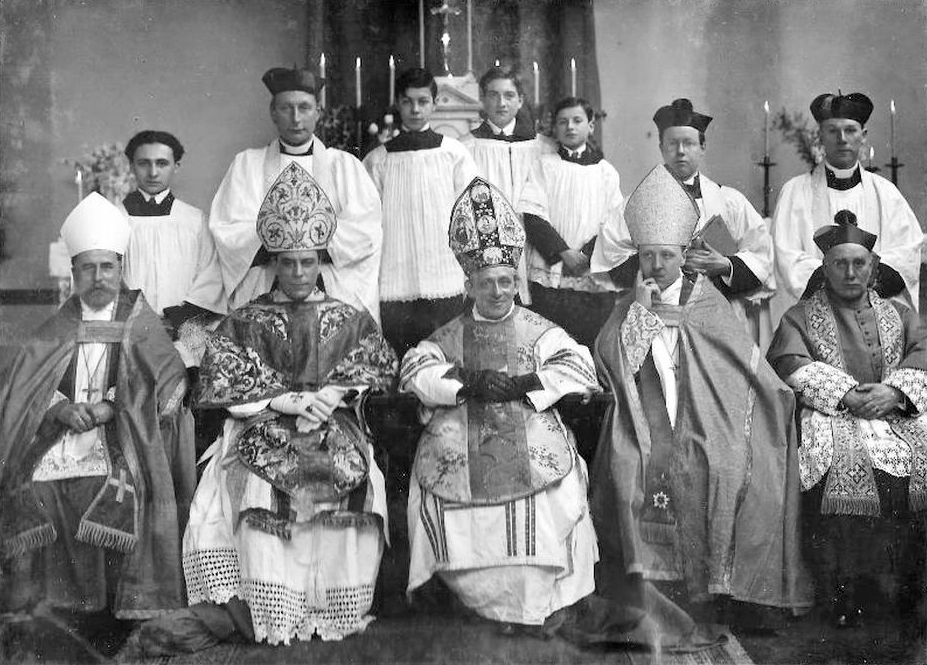
Episcopal consecration of Wedgwood by Willoughby, King and Gauntlett, 13 February 1916

The Liberal Catholic movement descended from the Old Roman Catholic Church in Great Britain, an Independent Old Catholic church founded and led by Arnold Harris Mathew until his death in 1919.

During the initial years of the Old Roman Catholic Church in Great Britain's existence, the majority of clergy involved with Mathew were members of the Theosophical Society and the Order of the Star in the East; and by 1915, they were informed to separate from these organizations.

Weeks later, these clergy separated from Mathew and one of them, Frederick Samuel Willoughby—consecrated and later disowned by Mathew—would then serve as the chief consecrator for James Ingall Wedgwood in 1916.

After he had been consecrated as a bishop in 1916, Wedgwood then travelled to Australia and ordained and consecrated Charles Webster Leadbeater to the episcopacy. He would also initiate Leadbeater into Freemasonry and Martinism.

=== Foundation of the Liberal Catholic Church ===
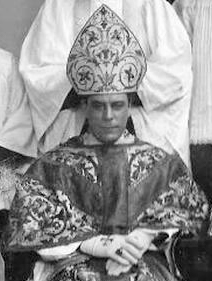
Bishop J. I. Wedgwood

Wedgwood established the seeds for the Liberal Catholic Church in the United States of America, in 1917; and he traveled between New York, Chicago and Los Angeles to assist in ordinations and confirmations. By August 1918, Wedgwood, Leadbeater and others met in synod in London to agree on a name for all churches under their umbrella; the names Liberal Christian Church (Old-Catholic) and Gnostic Catholic Church were rejected. The name Liberal Catholic Church (Old-Catholic) was adopted in recognition of the church's Old Catholic heritage, whilst being more progressive; and by 1919, there were four Liberal Catholic places of worship in the United States.

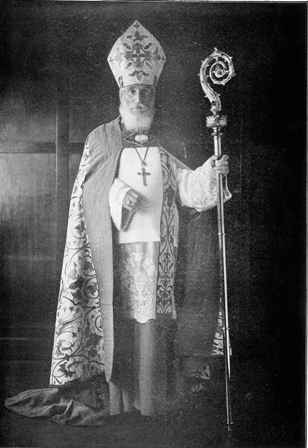
Bishop C.W. Leadbeater

Wedgwood says that during the existence of the early unified Liberal Catholic Church, he created the Liberal Rite, which was published in 1919. Following accusations of sexual misconduct with juveniles, Wedgwood resigned from the Theosophical Society and the Liberal Catholic Church by May 1922; and Leadbeater was unanimously elected as successor to the Liberal Catholic Church's leadership.

=== Schism within the Liberal Catholic Church ===
In 1947, a part of the Liberal Catholic Church schismed due to controversy over the suspension of a Liberal Catholic bishop. This schism became the Liberal Catholic Church International (LCCI), and despite its name it is only present in the United States. The LCCI claims to adhere to Catholicism "with the widest measure of intellectual liberty and respect for the individual conscience." Following continued disputes, by 1962, the bishops in the Liberal Catholic Church incorporated the denomination in Maryland as the Liberal Catholic Church, Province of the United States of America.

Both the Liberal Catholic Church, Province of the United States of America and the LCCI "describe themselves as the Liberal Catholic Church or the Liberal Catholic Church in the Province of the United States and both claim 'official' status as the true church. Both the LCCI and the LCC have similarities and differences, but the critical distinction lies in the succession of bishops."

The Liberal Catholic Church, Province of the United States of America, has served as the mother church of Liberal Catholic denominations throughout the world organized as The Liberal Catholic Church. According to the Liberal Catholic Church, Province of Brazil, this worldwide communion had a presence in South Africa, Argentina, Australia, Belgium, Brazil, Cameroon, Canada, Chile, Colombia, the Republic of the Congo, Croatia, Cuba, Denmark, Finland, France, Indonesia, Ghana, the United Kingdom, the Netherlands, Hungary, India, New Zealand, Puerto Rico, Portugal, Sweden, and Uruguay.

=== The Young Rite and the Alexandrian Community ===
In 2006, a Liberal Catholic bishop—Johannes van Alphen—consecrated Markus van Alphen. Alphen, in turn, established the Young Rite. Bishop Johannes himself eventually joined the Young Rite, serving there until his death. Among the tenets of the Young Rite was the belief that all possessed a path to the priesthood, and anyone requesting ordination should receive it. This practice was abandoned in the United States after Markus van Alphen's retirement and with the establishment of the Community of Saint George, a Young Rite jurisdiction. Young Rite USA then required a multi-year formation program for its clergy. The bishops within the Community of Saint George would later reorganize themselves as the Alexandrian Community, under the leadership of David Oliver Kling.

== Doctrine ==
Within the Liberal Catholic movement, the "Ancient Wisdom religion" and Catholicism are syncretized, and lay members are free to interpret the Bible and all matters of doctrine as they choose. However, in the Liberal Catholic Church, Province of the United States of America, only men who have accepted the Summary of Doctrine are eligible for holy orders. The Liberal Catholic churches accept the seven sacraments, and Bishop Leadbeater defined sacramental theology in esoteric and Theosophical terms through his publication, The Science of the Sacraments. There are some Liberal Catholic churches which are non-Theosophical, whilst maintaining freedom of interpretation.

== See also ==
- Warren Prall Watters
- Old Catholic Church
