= Julia Warde-Aldam =

British estate owner, benefactor, hospital commandant (1857–1931)

Julia Warde-Aldam MBE ARRC
- Born: Sarah Julia Warde; 1857; Carleton-in-Craven
- Died: 18 July 1931 (aged 73–74)
- Occupations: Estate owner; benefactor; hospital commandant
- Spouse: William Wright Aldam (m. 1878)
- Children: 2

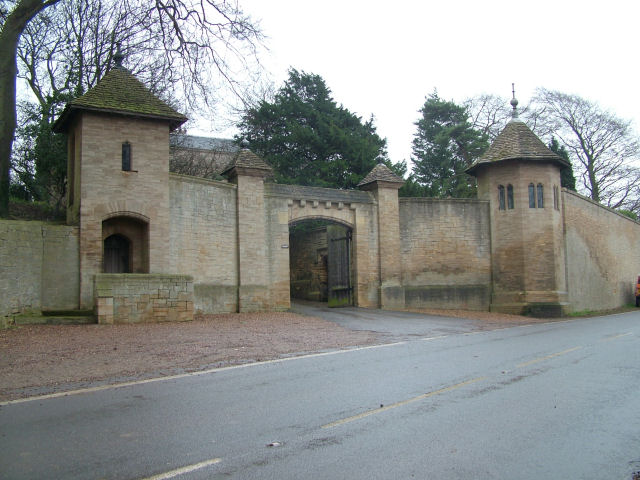
Hooton Pagnell Hall gatehouse, built by Warde-Aldam around 1920

Sarah Julia Warde-Aldam MBE ARRC (née Warde; 1857–1931) was a South Yorkshire estate owner, benefactor and hospital commandant.

== Early life and marriage ==
Julia Warde was born at Carleton, near Pontefract, the younger daughter of Revd William Warde, previously vicar of Campsall, and his wife Marianne (née Smithson).

On her father's death in 1868, she and her elder sister Mary Ann jointly inherited Hooton Pagnell Hall, near Doncaster, which had been bought by the family of Sir Patience Warde in 1704. Mary died in 1880, leaving Julia as sole inheritor.

In 1878 she married William Wright Aldam, son of William Aldam MP and owner of Frickley Hall, taking the name Warde-Aldam. They had two sons, William St. Andrew (1882–1958), who inherited the Hooton Pagnell estate, and John Ralph Patentius (born 1892) who inherited the Frickley estate. On Willam's father's death in 1890, the couple also inherited Healey Hall in Northumberland, and in 1899 they purchased the estate of Ederline in Argyllshire.

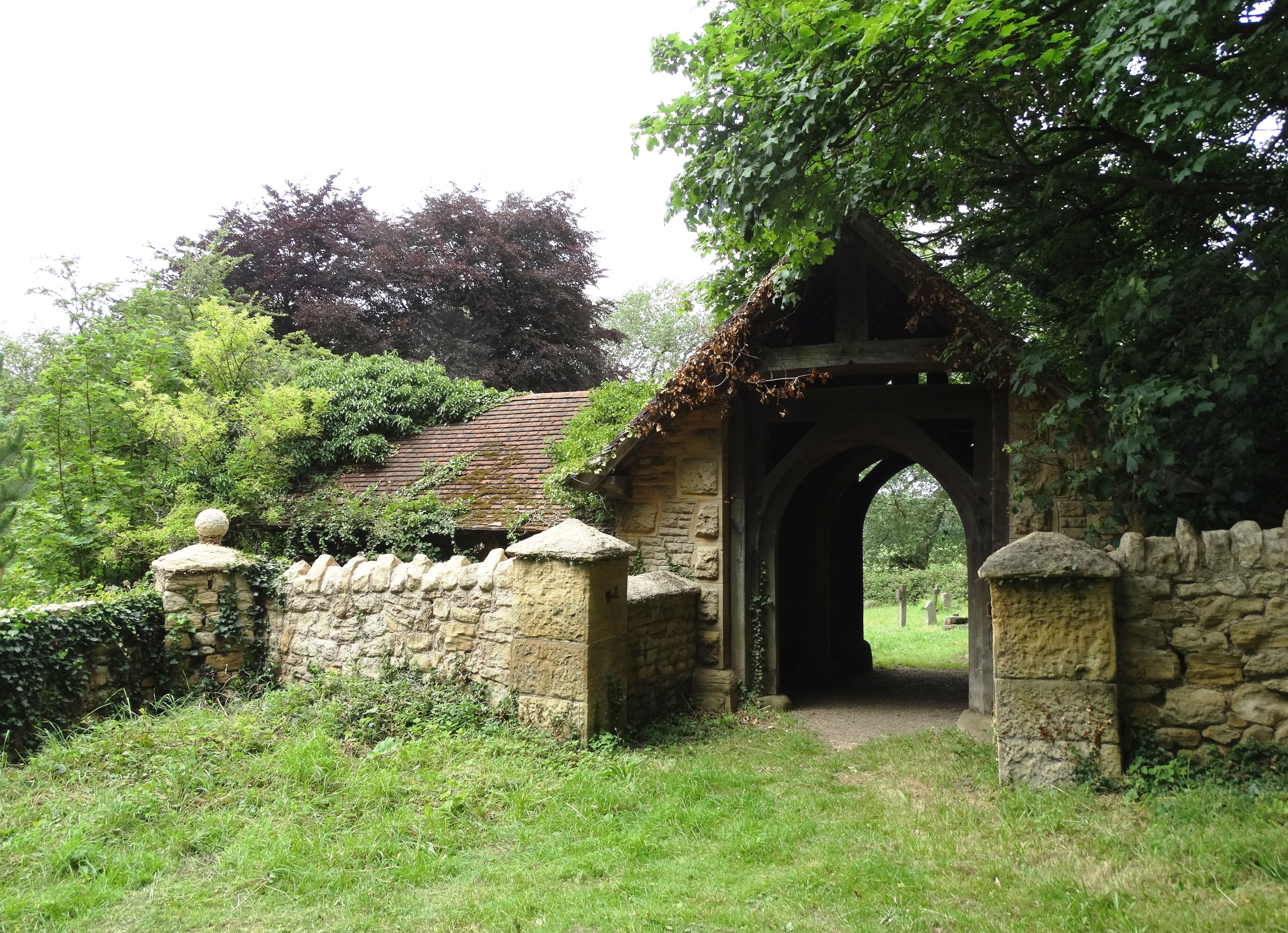
Lych gate given by Warde-Aldam to Hooton Pagnell church

Mining of coal on the various estates, including at Frickley Colliery in South Elmsall (named after the Warde-Aldams' Frickley estate), brought a great deal of wealth to the couple. Julia took a keen interest in the houses and estates, most significantly at Hooton Pagnell hall, which she remodelled substantially, giving its current crenellated gothic appearance, and added the East wing, as well as a gatehouse building in a gothic style. She also added a dining hall and master bedroom to Healey Hall, and restored the churches in both Hooton Pagnell and Frickley.

Described as "a flamboyant benefactor with a fondness for seances" she had a wide range of interests, including collecting a notable collection of 2,000 book-plates. She was a keen amateur artist, and numerous paintings attributed to her survive.

== St Chad's Hostel ==
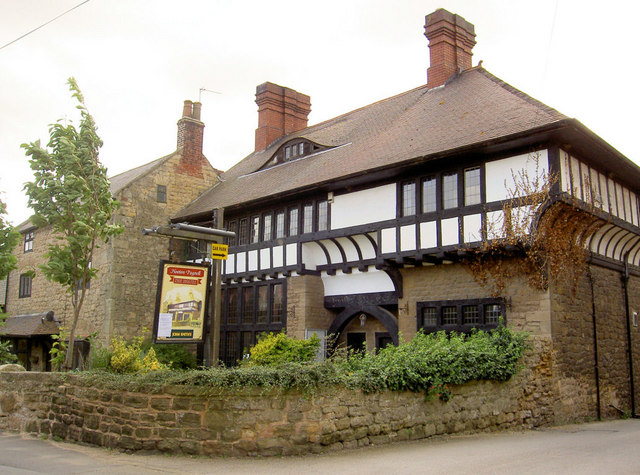
St Chad's Hostel, constructed by Warde-Aldam in 1903-4

In 1902, Frederick Samuel Willoughby, vicar of Hooton Pagnell, founded St Chad's Hostel to train men for ministry in the Church of England. Warde-Aldam was the project's major benefactor, and she provided a new building for the hostel in 1903–4. She continued to support the hostel while it remained in the village until 1916, but no further involvement is recorded after it moved to Durham as St Chad's Hall (now St Chad's College, Durham).

After the closure of the hostel, the building was given by the family to the village to serve as a village club.

== Hospital commandant ==
In September 1914, a month after the Britain's entry into the First World War, Warde-Aldam opened up Hooton Pagnell hall as the Hooton Pagnell Auxiliary Military Hospital. She took on the role of Red Cross Commandant and matron of the hospital, and was honoured with an MBE in the 1918 Birthday Honours, and the Royal Red Cross, Second Class.

== Later life, death and legacy ==
William Warde-Aldam died in 1921, while Julia herself died in 1931.

In the early 21st century, increased awareness of Julia Warde-Aldam's involvement in the early years of St Chad's College, Durham led to the college recognising her as a co-founder, and in 2019 commissioning a new portrait by Alice Channon which was placed in the college dining hall alongside that of fellow co-founder Douglas Horsfall.
