= J. I. Wedgwood =

Bishop of the Liberal Catholic Church (1883–1951)

The Right Reverend James Ingall Wedgwood
- Presiding Bishop of the Liberal Catholic Church
- Church: Liberal Catholic Church

Orders
- Consecration: 1916 by Frederick Samuel Willoughby

Personal details
- Born: 24 March 1883
- Died: 13 March 1951 (aged 67)
- Denomination: Independent Catholicism

James Ingall Wedgwood (24 March 1883 – 13 March 1951) was the first Presiding Bishop of the Liberal Catholic Church. Wedgwood was a former Anglican, a member of the Theosophical Society and a member of a co-Masonic order. His work on the Liberal Rite, as well as his efforts to establish a progressive church, are his greatest legacies.

== Biography ==
=== Early life and adulthood ===
Wedgwood was born in London in 1883, the son of Alfred Allen Wedgwood, son of Hensleigh Wedgwood and Rosina Margaret Ingall. He was a descendant of Josiah Wedgwood, Master-Potter of Etruria. In 1894 he was sent to Windlesham House School, leaving for Brighton College in 1897.

He studied organ construction and became an organist at 14; before 18 was already an authority, writing many standard texts. He then studied at University College, Nottingham, with the intention of making a living as a chemist, but found himself attracted to High Anglican worship, becoming an altar server and later being sent to York Minster, where as choirmaster he trained boys in plainchant. As an Anglo-Catholic he became a member of the Confraternity of the Blessed Sacrament.

=== Theosophy and co-masonry ===
In 1904 Wedgwood attended a lecture on Theosophy given by Annie Besant in York. Having heard her once previously in Nottingham, he determined to end his interest in Theosophy by attending a second lecture and ridding himself of "that woman". Three days later he joined the Theosophical Society and was forbidden to return to the church. Citing the local canon, he wrote: "The Vicar could not have such a heretic as a church official!".

=== Liberal Catholic Church ===
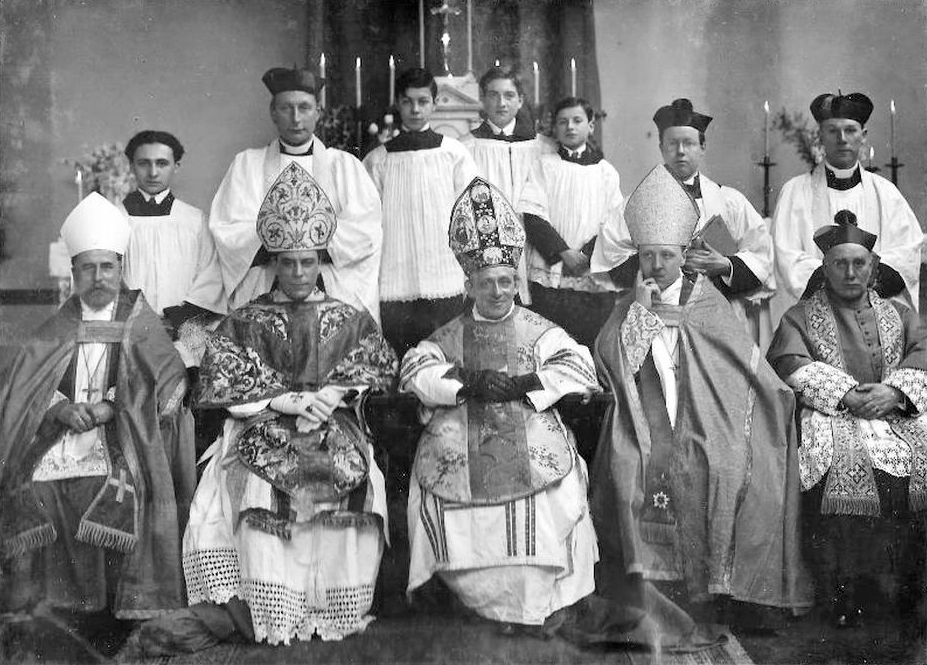
Consecration of Wedgwood by Willoughby, King and Gauntlett, 13 Feb 1916

On his return to England, Wedgwood learned that one of the bishops of the church, Frederick Samuel Willoughby, had become enmeshed in a sexual misconduct scandal and as a result had been suspended by Archbishop Arnold Harris Mathew. Mathew wanted all the clergy of the church to renounce Theosophy as he had heard from a non-Theosophical priest that the beliefs of the society were incompatible.

Bishop Willoughby offered to consecrate Wedgwood to the episcopate in order to guard the apostolic succession as he had received it. Wedgwood, however, approached a number of other bishops seeking consecration. He wrote to the Old Catholic Archbishop of Utrecht, by whom Mathew had originally been consecrated, but received no reply. He then approached Bishop Frederick James, a fellow Theosophist and a number of other wandering bishops, but none would oblige. With no other options open, Wedgwood received from Willoughby, King and Gauntlett the apostolic succession on 13 February 1916. This took place only after Archbishop Mathew had dissolved the Old Roman Catholic Church and published a letter in The Times announcing his intention to join the Roman Catholic Church.

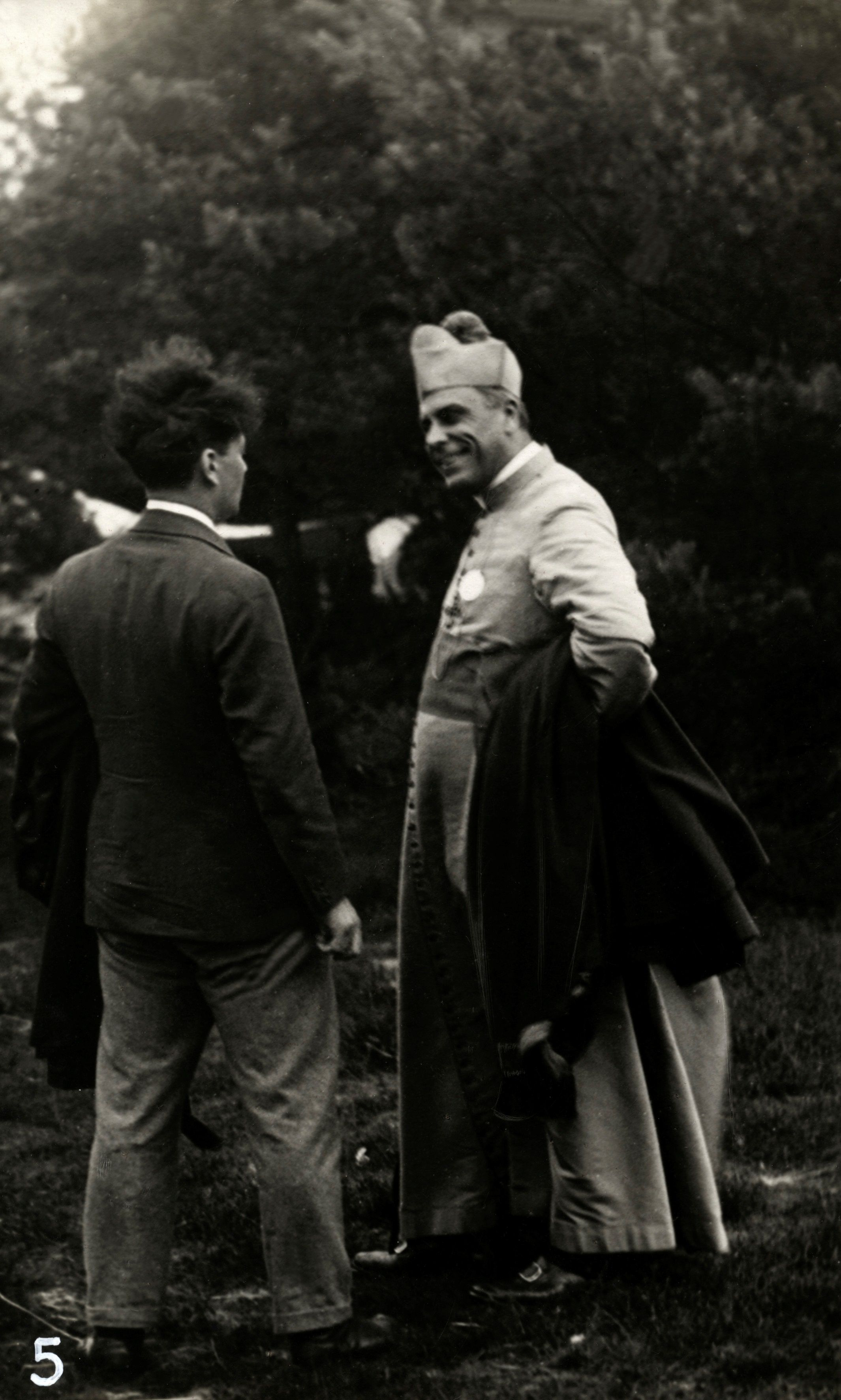
Wedgwood at the theosophical Star Camp in Ommen, the Netherlands (1926)

After his episcopal consecration, Wedgwood traveled to Australia and consecrated Charles Webster Leadbeater as a bishop. He also initiated Leadbeater into Freemasonry and Martinism. By 1917, seeds for the Liberal Catholic Church were established in the United States, and in 1919 there were four Liberal Catholic houses of worship.

In 1919, together with several other priests and bishops of the Liberal Catholic Church, he came under investigation for sexual activities involving boys. The scandals continued through the following years, leading to Wedgwood's resignation from the Theosophical Society and various other bodies and organisations including the Liberal Catholic Church (12 March 1923), announcing in a letter to Annie Besant of the Theosophical Society that he would henceforth retire into private life. Leadbeater was appointed as his successor.

Wedgwood then enrolled as a doctoral candidate at the Sorbonne, combining his studies with experiments at the works of a celebrated organ builder and activities at Russian Orthodox and Old Catholic churches. Whilst in Paris, he became addicted to cocaine, which he used in quantity, smuggling it into England on his visits concealed in the head of his bishop's crozier. Whilst he was in Paris, the symptoms of secondary syphilis manifested themselves—he had contracted the disease as the result of oral sex in Sydney but had refused to admit the fact or to take any treatment.

By 1924, with money running short, Wedgwood approached his old friend Annie Besant and through her influence again became involved with the church in Huizen, Netherlands, where he was offered a house and estate for his use. A small chapel was built and dedicated to Saint Michael and All Angels, where Wedgwood began to celebrate regular services. He also resumed his activities with the Theosophical Society, with increasingly frequent claimed visions and meetings with masters, angels, archangels and denizens of the higher realms.

=== Death and tributes ===
Wedgwood died on 13 March 1951 in Farnham, Surrey, from a fall which broke several ribs and ruptured a lung. In the years before his death he continued to wander in and out of the dementia of tertiary syphilis, in the lucid periods devoting himself to the work of the centre at Huizen and to the establishment of a lesser centre at Tekels Park near Camberley, Surrey, in England, where he lived almost entirely from 1937 onwards. According to Tilet's account of Wedgwood, periods became less and less over the years and during his last months he had to be kept from any involvement in public activities, even from eating in the communal dining room, because of his unpredictable behaviour.

His death brought eulogies from his most devoted followers. Bishop Vreede wrote:

His crucifixion is at an end ... In utter defencelessness and harmlessness and in utter humility he took upon himself the vicarious atonement for the bearers of the apostolic succession he brought over to the Liberal Catholic Church and by that sacrifice occultly founded the church and opened a possibility for the redemption of the Lord's Church at large.

Privately, even his friends were more equivocal. E. L. Gardner, an eminent British Theosophist who was responsible for arranging for Wedgwood to be looked after in his declining years, wrote privately, "JIW was a 'dual' - at times skilled, able and impressive. Then a bout of sensualism of the worst grade, sexual perversion."

Others remembered him differently. This is what Oscar Köllerström wrote in his tribute to Bishop Wedgwood (The Liberal Catholic, July 1951):

I was the blessed witness of a sacramental act of creation. I sat in the same room in which, day after tremendous day, those two men [Wedgwood and Leadbeater] worked out and planned The Liberal Catholic Liturgy – planned, for the first time in two millennia, a Christian and sacramental worship that opened wide the way to communion with all other faiths, indeed with all individual interpretations. The bond with God incarnated in freedom, there before my amazed eyes. Our oak sideboard became the first altar of the new faith, and after the services were over, the dining room furniture would be reassembled for a great meal. My mother would sometimes leave the service immediately after communion to see about the cooking, for in those days there was always at least a dozen to feed. It was all so intimate, personal, and natural, and there was such tumultuous rush of doings – my mother making vestments, Pellegrini, of the Catholic shop, being charmingly voluble, the preparation of the hymn book, endless typing, and the running of errands, buying a church, and – vivid in memory – the great day when I took my first minor orders. What with the candles, and the incense, and the singing, I was intoxicated anew each day. And there were the choir practices, and my mother playing the organ, and then, while I pumped hard, Bishop Wedgwood came up into the organ loft and showed me how to make the organ “hick”. In spite of the tumultuous activity he had instigated, he always had time to be on such human, personal terms with one. I well recall quite a long discussion I had with him in which, while our name was still sub judice, I was urging on him the name Liberal Catholic Church. Though I was only a boy, he discussed the pros and cons with me with the same fullness with which I heard him discuss them with Bishop Leadbeater. He honoured every personality. He could do this because it was the work, and not personalities, that counted. And as for us, we all followed him for whom the call of the Lord’s work made all personalities genuine vehicles of spirit.

== See also ==
- Liberal Catholic Church
