= Old Roman Catholic Church in Great Britain =

- Classification: Western Christian
- Orientation: Independent Old Catholic
- Theology: Ultrajectine
- Governance: Episcopal
- Leader: Archbishop William Myers
- Region: United Kingdom, Ireland
- Headquarters: London
- Founder: Arnold Harris Mathew
- Origin: 1910; London
- Branched from: Union of Utrecht (Old Catholic)
- Official website: oldromancatholic.org.uk

The Old Roman Catholic Church in Great Britain is an Independent Old Catholic church claiming descent from Arnold Harris Mathew in 1910.

== Theology and practices ==
The church holds Catholic dogmas as held by the Church of Utrecht. These include belief, among other things, in the Nicene Creed, seven sacraments and apostolic succession. The church does not hold as dogma the Immaculate Conception, papal infallibility or the Assumption, but these may be believed privately. Parishes use the Tridentine Mass for liturgy.

== Leadership ==
Archbishop Arnold Harris Mathew led the original church after its establishment in 1910 until his death in 1919. He was succeeded by Archbishop Bernard Mary Williams who was in favour of reuniting the church with the Roman Catholic Church and existing as a "uniate" rite. At his death in 1952, the clergy elected Geoffrey Peter Thomas Paget King as his successor. However, there was already a bishop in the United Kingdom named Gerard George Shelley. Seeing no need for two bishops, the clergy elected him to succeed Williams. Paget King was consecrated as a bishop by Shelley in 1960 and succeeded him as head of the church after Shelley had died. He was followed by Archbishop James Hedley Thatcher in 1982 and Archbishop Denis St Pierre.

The church is currently led by Archbishop Douglas Lewins, who succeeded to its headship in 1993. He is assisted by Bishop Howard Weston-Smart. The Society of Mercy is also an integral part of the church.
