= Grade II* listed buildings in South Yorkshire =

South Yorkshire shown in England

There are over 20,000 Grade II* listed buildings in England. This list includes those in South Yorkshire.

== Barnsley ==
Name	Location	Type	Completed (Note: The date given is the date used by Historic England as significant for the initial building or that of an important part in the structure's description.)	Date designated	Grid ref. (Note: The grid reference is based on the British national grid reference system, sometimes known as OSGB36, used by the Ordnance Survey.) Geo-coordinates	Entry number (Note: The "List Entry Number" is a unique number assigned to each listed building and scheduled monument by Historic England.)	Image
Grimethorpe Hall	Brierley, Barnsley	House	c. 1670	18 April 1985	SE4103609639; 53°34′54″N 1°22′54″W	1151202	Grimethorpe Hall More images
Cannon Hall	Cawthorne, Barnsley	Country House	Late 17th century	25 February 1952	SE2721708332; 53°34′15″N 1°35′26″W	1151805	Cannon Hall More images
Church of All Saints	Cawthorne, Barnsley	Church	13th century	18 March 1968	SE2850307960; 53°34′03″N 1°34′16″W	1191523	Church of All Saints More images
Wool Greaves Farmhouse	Cawthorne, Barnsley	Farmhouse	1672	18 March 1968	SE2674806133; 53°33′04″N 1°35′52″W	1192159	Upload Photo
Church of St Michael and All Angels and adjoining Stone Wall to West Side of Churchyard	Great Houghton, Barnsley	Church	19th century	18 April 1985	SE4304106536; 53°33′13″N 1°21′06″W	1151170	Church of St Michael and All Angels and adjoining Stone Wall to West Side of Churchyard More images
Barn at Ingfield Farm immediately West of Ings Cottage	Ingbirchworth, Gunthwaite and Ingbirchworth, Barnsley	Cruck Barn	16th century	18 March 1968	SE2233405641; 53°32′49″N 1°39′52″W	1151108	Upload Photo
Stable Range about 30m west of Gunthwaite Hall Barn	Gunthwaite, Gunthwaite and Ingbirchworth, Barnsley	Stable	1699	25 February 1952	SE2372806558; 53°33′18″N 1°38′36″W	1151107	Upload Photo
Bullhouse Hall including the cottage to left (rear)	Millhouse, Penistone, Barnsley	House	1655	27 April 1988	SE2112202712; 53°31′14″N 1°40′58″W	1151820	Upload Photo
Cat Hill Farmhouse	Penistone, Barnsley	Farmhouse	1634	23 June 1965	SE2477605226; 53°32′35″N 1°37′39″W	1191706	Upload Photo
Summerhouse about 20 Metres north-east of No 1, Bullhouse	Millhouse, Penistone, Barnsley	Summerhouse	1686	27 April 1988	SE2115802758; 53°31′16″N 1°40′56″W	1151824	Upload Photo
Knabbe's Hall	Silkstone Common, Silkstone, Barnsley	Farmhouse	Third quarter of 17th century	25 February 1952	SE2883903821; 53°31′49″N 1°33′59″W	1314749	Upload Photo
Conservatory and linking Bridge at North West corner of Wentworth Castle	Wentworth Castle, Stainborough, Barnsley	Country House	1840s	25 February 1952	SE3194203162; 53°31′27″N 1°31′11″W	1191675	Conservatory and linking Bridge at North West corner of Wentworth Castle More images
Duke of Argyll's Monument	Wentworth Castle, Stainborough, Barnsley	Column	1744	18 March 1968	SE3224502420; 53°31′03″N 1°30′55″W	1151064	Duke of Argyll's Monument More images
Gun Room	Wentworth Castle, Stainborough, Barnsley	Bath House	Late 18th century	25 February 1952	SE3194403224; 53°31′29″N 1°31′11″W	1151066	Gun Room
Obelisk to Lady Mary Wortley Montagu	Wentworth Castle, Stainborough, Barnsley	Monument	c.1746	18 March 1968	SE3171002987; 53°31′19″N 1°31′24″W	1151068	Obelisk to Lady Mary Wortley Montagu
Pillared Barn about 20m to south of Steeple Lodge	Wentworth Castle, Stainborough, Barnsley	Hay Barn	c. 1775	5 November 1973	SE3186103465; 53°31′37″N 1°31′15″W	1315049	Pillared Barn about 20m to south of Steeple Lodge
Rotunda Temple	Wentworth Castle, Stainborough, Barnsley	Garden Temple	1746	18 March 1968	SE3278602722; 53°31′13″N 1°30′25″W	1191615	Rotunda Temple More images
Stainborough Castle	Wentworth Castle, Stainborough, Barnsley	Folly	1728-30	18 March 1968	SE3158003047; 53°31′23″N 1°31′30″W	1151069	Stainborough Castle More images
Statue of the First Earl of Strafford situated at North End of East Front of Wentworth Castle	Wentworth Castle, Stainborough, Barnsley	Statue	1744	4 December 1986	SE3199003220; 53°31′29″N 1°31′08″W	1191709	Statue of the First Earl of Strafford situated at North End of East Front of Wentworth Castle
Queen Anne's Obelisk	Wentworth Castle, Stainborough, Barnsley	Monument	1734	11 November 1966	SE3318702917; 53°31′19″N 1°30′03″W	1192441	Queen Anne's Obelisk More images
Church of St Peter	Tankersley, Barnsley	Church	1901	25 April 1969	SK3495099586; 53°29′31″N 1°28′29″W	1286900	Church of St Peter More images
Huthwaite Hall	Thurgoland, Barnsley	House	1748	27 April 1988	SE2836900454; 53°30′00″N 1°34′26″W	1286726	Huthwaite Hall More images
Wortley Hall with attached South-front Terrace and Steps including attached Retaining Wall and Steps to Wing set back on left	Wortley, Barnsley	Country House	1742-46	25 April 1969	SK3124199495; 53°29′28″N 1°31′50″W	1192585	Wortley Hall with attached South-front Terrace and Steps including attached Retaining Wall and Steps to Wing set back on left More images
Church of St Mary	Barnsley, Barnsley	Church	c. 1400	13 January 1986	SE3435606656; 53°33′19″N 1°28′58″W	1315008	Church of St Mary More images
Church of St Peter Including Attached Wall and Gateway to South West	Barnsley, Barnsley	Gate	1893-1910	13 January 1986	SE3510405883; 53°32′54″N 1°28′18″W	1314984	Church of St Peter Including Attached Wall and Gateway to South West More images
Darley Cliffe Hall including attached Front Garden Wall and Dwellings known as Tudor House and Dower Cottage	Barnsley	House	17th century	11 November 1966	SE3554704510; 53°32′10″N 1°27′54″W	1151042	Upload Photo
Houndhill	Barnsley	House	1606	11 November 1966	SE3372604141; 53°31′58″N 1°29′34″W	1151039	Upload Photo
Locke Park Tower	Barnsley, Barnsley	Tower	1875-1877	13 July 1976	SE3425005092; 53°32′29″N 1°29′05″W	1315014	Locke Park Tower More images
Swaithe House	Swaithe, Barnsley	Farmhouse	17th century	11 November 1966	SE3723004098; 53°31′56″N 1°26′23″W	1286701	Upload Photo
Worsbrough Corn Mill	Barnsley	Corn Mill	Early 17th century	11 November 1966	SE3494503326; 53°31′32″N 1°28′28″W	1151044	Worsbrough Corn Mill More images

== Doncaster ==
Name	Location	Type	Completed	Date designated	Grid ref. Geo-coordinates	Entry number	Image
Church of St John	Adwick upon Dearne, Doncaster	Church	12th century	5 June 1968	SE4702401495; 53°30′29″N 1°17′33″W	1151670	Church of St John More images
Church of St Helena	Austerfield, Doncaster	Church	11th century	5 June 1968	SK6616694691; 53°26′41″N 1°00′19″W	1151575	Church of St Helena More images
Barnburgh Hall Dovecote	Barnburgh, Doncaster	Dovecote	Late C16-Early 17th century	5 June 1968	SE4867703332; 53°31′28″N 1°16′02″W	1314757	Barnburgh Hall Dovecote More images
Church of St Oswald	Kirk Sandall, Barnby Dun with Kirk Sandall, Doncaster	Church	12th century	5 June 1968	SE6092808130; 53°33′59″N 1°04′54″W	1286919	Church of St Oswald More images
Bawtry Hall	Bawtry, Doncaster	House	1785	11 January 1988	SK6506692876; 53°25′43″N 1°01′20″W	1151550	Bawtry Hall More images
Church of St James	Braithwell, Doncaster	Sundial	1828	5 June 1968	SK5299294697; 53°26′47″N 1°12′13″W	1286514	Church of St James More images
Church of St Michael and All Angels	Brodsworth, Doncaster	Church	11th century	5 June 1968	SE5067307230; 53°33′33″N 1°14′11″W	1191555	Church of St Michael and All Angels More images
St Anne's Rest Home	Burghwallis, Doncaster	House	Early 16th century	23 March 1988	SE5362011988; 53°36′06″N 1°11′28″W	1192073	St Anne's Rest Home
Cantley Hall and Outbuildings	Cantley, Doncaster	Country House	1785	5 June 1968	SE6249102139; 53°30′44″N 1°03′33″W	1191866	Cantley Hall and Outbuildings More images
Church of All Saints	Clayton with Frickley, Doncaster	Church	12th century	5 June 1968	SE4684907882; 53°33′56″N 1°17′39″W	1151647	Church of All Saints More images
Hickleton Hall with attached Quadrant Walls and Walls extended to enclose Entrance Front Garden with associated Gate Piers and Statues	Hickleton, Doncaster	Country House	1745-1748	27 May 1953	SE4822605154; 53°32′27″N 1°16′26″W	1286810	Hickleton Hall with attached Quadrant Walls and Walls extended to enclose Entrance Front Garden with associated Gate Piers and Statues More images
Stable to Hickleton Hall including the Stable Cottage and attached Walls and Gatepiers	Hickleton Hall, Hickleton, Doncaster	House	Post Mid 18th century	11 April 1986	SE4820805244; 53°32′30″N 1°16′26″W	1151659	Upload Photo
The Brewhouse	Hickleton Hall, Hickleton, Doncaster	Brewhouse	Mid 18th century	11 April 1986	SE4820305212; 53°32′29″N 1°16′27″W	1286781	Upload Photo
Church of St James	High Melton, Doncaster	Church	12th century	5 June 1968	SE5091701811; 53°30′38″N 1°14′01″W	1192208	Church of St James More images
Hooton Pagnell Hall including Archway Flat. Nos 1 and 2, Hall Cottages, Ground Floor Flat, First Floor Flat and Pump End	Hooton Pagnell Hall, Hooton Pagnell, Doncaster	House	18th century	27 May 1953	SE4856907874; 53°33′55″N 1°16′05″W	1192355	Hooton Pagnell Hall including Archway Flat. Nos 1 and 2, Hall Cottages, Ground Floor Flat, First Floor Flat and Pump End More images
Church of St Mary	Kirk Bramwith, Doncaster	Church	12th century	29 September 1987	SE6199611722; 53°35′54″N 1°03′53″W	1286522	Church of St Mary More images
Church of St Katharine	Loversall, Doncaster	Church	c. 1300	5 June 1968	SK5761398733; 53°28′56″N 1°08′00″W	1193085	Church of St Katharine More images
Tomb Chest about 3m to South of South Chapel to Church of St Katharine	Loversall, Doncaster	Chest Tomb	Early 14th century	26 November 1987	SK5761898718; 53°28′55″N 1°08′00″W	1314861	Tomb Chest about 3m to South of South Chapel to Church of St Katharine
Owston Hall, Flats 1 to 5 and including the Old Hall	Owston Village, Owston, Doncaster	Apartment	1988	5 June 1968	SE5500111090; 53°35′37″N 1°10′14″W	1286676	Owston Hall, Flats 1 to 5 and including the Old Hall More images
Church of St Michael	Rossington, Doncaster	Church	12th century	5 June 1968	SK6250898396; 53°28′43″N 1°03′35″W	1151519	Church of St Michael More images
Church of St Winifred	Stainton, Doncaster	Church	12th century	5 June 1968	SK5552093633; 53°26′12″N 1°09′57″W	1286289	Church of St Winifred More images
Remains of Chapel at Manor House Farm	Thorpe in Balne, Doncaster	Chapel	12th century	5 June 1968	SE5990511084; 53°35′35″N 1°05′47″W	1286641	Upload Photo
Lindrick House	Tickhill, Doncaster	House	Early 18th century	22 January 1981	SK5904792660; 53°25′39″N 1°06′46″W	1191433	Lindrick House More images
St Leonard's Hospital	Tickhill, Doncaster	House	1470	27 December 1962	SK5924693374; 53°26′02″N 1°06′35″W	1191574	St Leonard's Hospital More images
The Friary and Friary Close	Tickhill, Doncaster	House	1983	27 December 1962	SK5860492755; 53°25′42″N 1°07′10″W	1286862	Upload Photo
Tickhill Castle House	Tickhill, Doncaster	House	17th century	22 January 1981	SK5929392902; 53°25′46″N 1°06′33″W	1151747	Tickhill Castle House
East Lodge and attached Forecourt Wall	Wadworth, Doncaster	Gate Lodge	c. 1750	5 June 1968	SK5672797193; 53°28′06″N 1°08′49″W	1193428	Upload Photo
West Lodge and attached Forecourt Wall	Wadworth, Doncaster	Gate Lodge	c. 1750	5 June 1968	SK5669297190; 53°28′06″N 1°08′51″W	1151506	Upload Photo
Warmsworth Hall	Warmsworth, Doncaster	House	1668	5 June 1968	SE5471400608; 53°29′58″N 1°10′36″W	1193489	Warmsworth Hall
Christ Church	Doncaster	Church	1827-9	12 June 1950	SE5797703309; 53°31′24″N 1°07′37″W	1286309	Christ Church More images
Church of St Laurence	Adwick le Street	Church	12th century	19 October 1962	SE5409808601; 53°34′16″N 1°11′04″W	1151473	Church of St Laurence More images
Church of St Wilfrid	Cantley, Doncaster	Tower	15th century	5 September 1988	SE6185001439; 53°30′22″N 1°04′08″W	1151446	Church of St Wilfrid More images
The Market Hall, Corn Exchange and Fish Market	Doncaster	Corn Exchange	1870-3	12 June 1950	SE5759303444; 53°31′28″N 1°07′58″W	1192688	The Market Hall, Corn Exchange and Fish Market More images

== Rotherham ==
Name	Location	Type	Completed	Date designated	Grid ref. Geo-coordinates	Entry number	Image
Aughton Court	Aston, Aston cum Aughton, Rotherham	Country House	c. 1772	29 March 1968	SK4690485181; 53°21′41″N 1°17′48″W	1314660	Aughton Court More images
Hellaby Hall	Bramley, Rotherham	House	c. 1690	1 April 1987	SK5057692271; 53°25′29″N 1°14′25″W	1192650	Hellaby Hall More images
Hoober Stand	Brampton Bierlow, Rotherham	Tower	1747-9	29 April 1952	SK4074798545; 53°28′55″N 1°23′15″W	1132812	Hoober Stand More images
Needle's Eye	Brampton Bierlow, Rotherham	Carriageway	Mid-Late 18th century	29 March 1968	SK3962298821; 53°29′05″N 1°24′16″W	1314588	Needle's Eye More images
Rainborough Lodges and Gates	Brampton Bierlow, Rotherham	Gate Lodge	1798-1804	29 March 1968	SE4075700616; 53°30′02″N 1°23′13″W	1314591	Rainborough Lodges and Gates More images
Dinnington Hall	Dinnington St. John's, Rotherham	House	Early to mid 18th century	29 July 1966	SK5248885686; 53°21′56″N 1°12′46″W	1314652	Dinnington Hall
4, Walseker Lane	Woodall, Harthill with Woodall, Rotherham	Farmhouse	Late Medieval	15 October 1986	SK4828780763; 53°19′18″N 1°16′36″W	1132671	Upload Photo
Church of St John the Baptist	Hooton Roberts, Rotherham	Church	12th century	29 March 1968	SK4840397066; 53°28′05″N 1°16′20″W	1286668	Church of St John the Baptist More images
Slade Hooton Hall	Slade Hooton, Laughton-en-le-Morthen, Rotherham	Country House	1698	29 March 1968	SK5242089240; 53°23′51″N 1°12′47″W	1151845	Slade Hooton Hall More images
Stable and Remains of attached Barn immediately to South West of Slade Hooton Hall	Slade Hooton, Laughton-en-le-Morthen, Rotherham	Barn	1705	29 March 1968	SK5240889217; 53°23′50″N 1°12′48″W	1193434	Upload Photo
Wall enclosing Front Garden to Slade Hooton Hall including attached Gatepiers and Gateway	Slade Hooton, Laughton-en-le-Morthen, Rotherham	Gate	c. 1700	29 March 1968	SK5239789267; 53°23′52″N 1°12′48″W	1151846	Upload Photo
Church of St Peter	Letwell, Rotherham	Church	15th century	29 July 1966	SK5594787052; 53°22′39″N 1°09′38″W	1132679	Church of St Peter More images
Langold Farmhouse	Letwell, Rotherham	Farmhouse	Mid C18, pre 1768	29 May 1966	SK5703886529; 53°22′21″N 1°08′39″W	1132672	Upload Photo
Old Stable and Coachhouse Buildings at Langold	Letwell, Rotherham	House	1986	29 May 1966	SK5703986529; 53°22′21″N 1°08′39″W	1314640	Upload Photo
Church of Saint Bartholomew	Maltby, Rotherham	Church	11th century	13 November 1959	SK5276791883; 53°25′16″N 1°12′27″W	1314662	Church of Saint Bartholomew More images
Malpas Hill Gateway	Sandbeck Park, Maltby, Rotherham	Gate	c. 1760	13 November 1959	SK5885990280; 53°24′22″N 1°06′58″W	1314689	Malpas Hill Gateway More images
Sandbeck Park Stables	Sandbeck Park, Maltby, Rotherham	House	c. 1760	13 November 1959	SK5683690337; 53°24′24″N 1°08′47″W	1151900	Upload Photo
Church of St James	Ravenfield, Rotherham	Church	18th century	29 March 1968	SK4858795452; 53°27′13″N 1°16′11″W	1151867	Church of St James More images
Gatehouse to Thorpe Salvin Hall	Thorpe Salvin, Rotherham	Gatehouse	Mid-late 16th century	29 July 1966	SK5212681243; 53°19′32″N 1°13′08″W	1314668	Gatehouse to Thorpe Salvin Hall More images
Ruins of Thorpe Salvin Hall	Thorpe Salvin, Rotherham	Country House	Mid to late C16, pre 1582	29 July 1966	SK5213981266; 53°19′33″N 1°13′07″W	1286372	Ruins of Thorpe Salvin Hall More images
Church of St Leonard	Thrybergh, Rotherham	Church	11th century	29 March 1968	SK4668795489; 53°27′15″N 1°17′54″W	1132783	Church of St Leonard More images
Thurcroft Hall	Brookhouse, Thurcroft, Rotherham	Country House	1699	29 March 1968	SK5095889213; 53°23′50″N 1°14′06″W	1314692	Thurcroft Hall More images
Church of St Peter and St Paul	Todwick, Rotherham	Church	11th century	29 July 1986	SK4974684126; 53°21′06″N 1°15′15″W	1151903	Church of St Peter and St Paul More images
Church of St John the Baptist	Wales, Rotherham	Church	Early 12th century	29 May 1966	SK4775782683; 53°20′20″N 1°17′03″W	1286360	Church of St John the Baptist More images
Camellia House	Wentworth Woodhouse, Wentworth, Rotherham	Camellia House	Mid 18th century	29 March 1968	SK3909697685; 53°28′28″N 1°24′45″W	1286162	Camellia House More images
Church of the Holy Trinity	Wentworth, Rotherham	Church	1872-76	29 March 1968	SK3838798141; 53°28′43″N 1°25′23″W	1192788	Church of the Holy Trinity More images
Doric Temple	Wentworth Park, Wentworth, Rotherham	Park	c. 1745	29 April 1952	SK3993097174; 53°28′11″N 1°24′00″W	1193160	Doric Temple More images
Gateway with attached Plinth Wall and Ironwork Screen forming South Side of South Court at Wentworth Woodhouse	Wentworth Woodhouse, Wentworth, Rotherham	Gate	c. 1630	21 August 1985	SK3957797633; 53°28′26″N 1°24′19″W	1193422	Gateway with attached Plinth Wall and Ironwork Screen forming South Side of South Court at Wentworth Woodhouse
Holy Trinity Wentworth (old) Church	Wentworth, Rotherham	Church	C14-C15	29 March 1968	SK3838198283; 53°28′48″N 1°25′23″W	1314580	Holy Trinity Wentworth (old) Church More images
Ionic Temple at West End of South Terrace	Wentworth Woodhouse, Wentworth, Rotherham	Temple	Possibly as early as 1735	21 August 1985	SK3912497554; 53°28′24″N 1°24′43″W	1132730	Ionic Temple at West End of South Terrace More images
Church of St Mary Magdalene	Whiston, Rotherham	Church	12th century	29 March 1968	SK4510590025; 53°24′18″N 1°19′23″W	1192880	Church of St Mary Magdalene More images
Morthen Hall	Whiston, Rotherham	Country House	Early 18th century	29 March 1968	SK4788689476; 53°24′00″N 1°16′53″W	1192970	Morthen Hall More images
Whiston Hall Barn	Whiston, Rotherham	Barn	16th century	19 February 1986	SK4473490053; 53°24′19″N 1°19′43″W	1132687	Whiston Hall Barn More images
Clifton House	Rotherham	House	1783	19 October 1951	SK4348892734; 53°25′47″N 1°20′49″W	1286766	Clifton House More images
Keppel's Column	Thorpe Common, Rotherham	Column	1773-80	19 February 1986	SK3894194731; 53°26′52″N 1°24′55″W	1314632	Keppel's Column More images
Moorgate Hall and attached Outbuilding	Rotherham	House	17th century	19 October 1951	SK4313192071; 53°25′25″N 1°21′09″W	1132715	Moorgate Hall and attached Outbuilding
Rockingham Kiln	Rotherham	Pottery Kiln	Early 19th century	11 December 1953	SK4405498814; 53°29′03″N 1°20′15″W	1314614	Rockingham Kiln More images
St Marys Rectory	Rotherham	Vicarage	1752	8 October 1962	SK4363495926; 53°27′30″N 1°20′40″W	1314613	Upload Photo
25 and 27 High Street	Rotherham	Inn	15th century	23 November 1973	SK4287792796; 53°25′49″N 1°21′22″W	1132712	25 and 27 High Street

== Sheffield ==
Name	Location	Type	Completed	Date designated	Grid ref. Geo-coordinates	Entry number	Image
Church of St James	Midhopestones, Bradfield, Sheffield	Church	Medieval	25 April 1969	SK2350099538; 53°29′31″N 1°38′50″W	1132872	Church of St James More images
Fair House Farmhouse	Low Bradfield, Bradfield, Sheffield	Farmhouse	Late 17th century	8 August 1985	SK2602491841; 53°25′22″N 1°36′36″W	1132863	Fair House Farmhouse More images
Loxley United Reformed Church	Loxley, Bradfield, Sheffield	Congregational Chapel	1787	8 August 1985	SK3029890164; 53°24′27″N 1°32′45″W	1314565	Loxley United Reformed Church More images
Onesacre Hall	Oughtibridge, Bradfield, Sheffield	House	1630-1640	25 April 1969	SK2973193436; 53°26′13″N 1°33′14″W	1191806	Onesacre Hall More images
Rolling Mill	Little Matlock, Bradfield, Sheffield	Rolling Mill	1882	24 June 1976	SK3095189419; 53°24′02″N 1°32′09″W	1132839	Rolling Mill More images
The Old Hall & the Priory	Ecclesfield, Sheffield	House	1736	25 February 1952	SK3525494262; 53°26′38″N 1°28′15″W	1314582	The Old Hall & the Priory More images
Whitley Hall Hotel	Ecclesfield, Sheffield	House	16th century	25 April 1969	SK3450694887; 53°26′59″N 1°28′55″W	1192829	Whitley Hall Hotel More images
Beauchief Hall and Adjoining Steps Forecourt Walls and Gates	Beauchief, Sheffield	Country House	1671	1 May 1952	SK3289681522; 53°19′47″N 1°30′27″W	1246567	Beauchief Hall and Adjoining Steps Forecourt Walls and Gates More images
Beehive Works	Sheffield	Cutlery Works	Late 1850s-c1890	13 June 1988	SK3473586663; 53°22′32″N 1°28′46″W	1271239	Beehive Works More images
Bishops' House	Meersbrook, Sheffield	Farmhouse	c. 1500	1 May 1952	SK3535683957; 53°21′05″N 1°28′13″W	1271162	Bishops' House More images
Broom Hall	Broomhall, Sheffield	House	16th century	1 May 1952	SK3368186525; 53°22′28″N 1°29′43″W	1271100	Broom Hall More images
Butchers Wheel	Sheffield	Cutlery Works	c. 1835	13 June 1988	SK3550186867; 53°22′39″N 1°28′04″W	1246467	Butchers Wheel More images
Carbrook Hall Public House	Carbrook, Sheffield	House	c. 1620	1 May 1952	SK3888390012; 53°24′20″N 1°25′00″W	1246476	Carbrook Hall Public House More images
Cathedral Church of St Marie	Sheffield	Parish Hall	1846-1850	28 June 1973	SK3547487293; 53°22′53″N 1°28′05″W	1271205	Cathedral Church of St Marie More images
Central Glasshouse on North West Side of Botanical Gardens	Broomhill, Sheffield	Colonnade	c. 1935	1 May 1952	SK3343986312; 53°22′21″N 1°29′56″W	1247258	Central Glasshouse on North West Side of Botanical Gardens More images
Church of St James the Great	Norton, Sheffield	Parish Church	11th century	1 May 1952	SK3587982166; 53°20′07″N 1°27′46″W	1271180	Church of St James the Great More images
Church of St John	Ranmoor, Sheffield	Parish Church	1879	28 June 1973	SK3195286280; 53°22′21″N 1°31′16″W	1271043	Church of St John More images
Church of St Mary	Sheffield	Church	1826-1830	28 June 1973	SK3524886306; 53°22′21″N 1°28′18″W	1246817	Church of St Mary More images
Church of St Mary the Virgin	Beighton, Sheffield	Parish Church	12th century	28 June 1973	SK4427283353; 53°20′43″N 1°20′11″W	1270442	Church of St Mary the Virgin More images
Church of St Paul	Parson Cross, Sheffield	Church	1958-1959	25 September 1998	SK3535693063; 53°25′59″N 1°28′09″W	1376605	Church of St Paul More images
Church of St Thomas a Becket and Remains of Beauchief Abbey Church	Beauchief, Sheffield	Abbey	c1175-1536	1 May 1952	SK3334381923; 53°19′59″N 1°30′03″W	1271291	Church of St Thomas a Becket and Remains of Beauchief Abbey Church More images
City Hall	Sheffield	Public Hall	1920-34	16 January 1981	SK3518987236; 53°22′51″N 1°28′21″W	1246548	City Hall More images
Crucible Steel Shop in South Corner of Sandersons Kaysers Darnall Works	Darnall, Sheffield	Crucible Steel Works	1871	21 May 1987	SK3847288374; 53°23′27″N 1°25′23″W	1247446	Crucible Steel Shop in South Corner of Sandersons Kaysers Darnall Works
Cruicible Steel Shops on South East Side of Sanderson Kaysers Darnall Works	Darnall, Sheffield	Crucible Steel Works	1872	21 May 1987	SK3849688385; 53°23′27″N 1°25′21″W	1247369	Cruicible Steel Shops on South East Side of Sanderson Kaysers Darnall Works
Cutlers Hall	Sheffield	Banqueting House	1832	28 June 1973	SK3537687402; 53°22′56″N 1°28′11″W	1247108	Cutlers Hall More images
East Range at Cornish Place Works	Kelham Island, Sheffield	Petrol Pump	c. 1924	28 June 1973	SK3491588291; 53°23′25″N 1°28′35″W	1270962	East Range at Cornish Place Works
Endcliffe Hall with Screen Wall to North West and Terrace Wall and Steps to South and West	Endcliffe, Sheffield	House	c. 1860	28 June 1973	SK3248886230; 53°22′19″N 1°30′47″W	1254807	Endcliffe Hall with Screen Wall to North West and Terrace Wall and Steps to South and West More images
Entrance Gateway to Green Lane Works	Kelham Island, Sheffield	Gate	1860	1 May 1952	SK3502588192; 53°23′22″N 1°28′29″W	1255044	Entrance Gateway to Green Lane Works More images
Former Counting House and Workmens' Cottages at Abbeydale Works Museum	Abbeydale, Sheffield	Workers Cottage	1786-93	1 May 1952	SK3257481999; 53°20′02″N 1°30′44″W	1271385	Former Counting House and Workmens' Cottages at Abbeydale Works Museum
Former Stables and Coach House at Number 3 Mount Pleasant Community Centre	Sharrow, Sheffield	Stable	c. 1770	1 May 1952	SK3485485720; 53°22′02″N 1°28′40″W	1270903	Former Stables and Coach House at Number 3 Mount Pleasant Community Centre
Gateway and Adjoining Walls at Garden Entrance to Oakes Park	Norton, Sheffield	Gate	Early 18th century	28 June 1973	SK3654182076; 53°20′04″N 1°27′10″W	1271161	Upload Photo
Gateway to General Cemetery with Screen and Flanking Walls	Sharrow, Sheffield	Gate	1836	8 September 1970	SK3422285835; 53°22′06″N 1°29′14″W	1247054	Gateway to General Cemetery with Screen and Flanking Walls
Globe Works	Kelham Island, Sheffield	Managers House	1825	14 May 1970	SK3481488238; 53°23′23″N 1°28′41″W	1271128	Globe Works More images
Heritage House	Upperthorpe, Sheffield	Hospital	1793-97	8 September 1970	SK3449288247; 53°23′24″N 1°28′58″W	1270452	Heritage House More images
King Edward VII Upper School	Broomhill, Sheffield	School	1995	28 June 1973	SK3364486714; 53°22′34″N 1°29′45″W	1254957	King Edward VII Upper School More images
Leah's Yard	Sheffield	Courtyard	Mid 19th century	31 May 1983	SK3519587112; 53°22′47″N 1°28′21″W	1247012	Leah's Yard More images
Left Hand Glasshouse on North West Side of Botanical Gardens	Broomhill, Sheffield	Glasshouse	1837-38	1 May 1952	SK3341986280; 53°22′20″N 1°29′57″W	1247278	Left Hand Glasshouse on North West Side of Botanical Gardens
Library and Arts Tower, University of Sheffield	Sheffield	Faculty Building	1962-1965	30 March 1993	SK3416987437; 53°22′58″N 1°29′16″W	1247655	Library and Arts Tower, University of Sheffield More images
Lyceum Theatre	Sheffield	Theatre	1897	15 November 1972	SK3557487201; 53°22′50″N 1°28′00″W	1270876	Lyceum Theatre More images
Main Gateway and Lodges to General Cemetery	Sharrow, Sheffield	Gate	1836	8 September 1970	SK3401185928; 53°22′09″N 1°29′25″W	1247071	Main Gateway and Lodges to General Cemetery More images
Managers House and Adjoining Stable on East Side of Abbeydale Works Museum	Abbeydale, Sheffield	Managers House	1838	28 June 1973	SK3236681439; 53°19′44″N 1°30′56″W	1246449	Upload Photo
Mappin Art Gallery	Weston Park, Sheffield	Park	1887	28 June 1973	SK3388587354; 53°22′55″N 1°29′31″W	1254483	Mappin Art Gallery More images
Mount Pleasant Community Centre	Sheffield	House	c. 1770	1 May 1952	SK3488285706; 53°22′01″N 1°28′38″W	1270937	Mount Pleasant Community Centre More images
Norton Hall Hospital with Colonnade and Orangery	Sheffield	Country House	Late 18th century	28 June 1973	SK3580982175; 53°20′07″N 1°27′49″W	1246798	Norton Hall Hospital with Colonnade and Orangery More images
Oaks Park and Adjoining Terrace Wall and Steps	Norton, Sheffield	Kitchen	Early 19th century	28 June 1973	SK3662282067; 53°20′03″N 1°27′05″W	1246843	Oaks Park and Adjoining Terrace Wall and Steps More images
Old Chapel at General Cemetery	Sharrow, Sheffield	Cemetery Chapel	c. 1836	8 September 1970	SK3413485879; 53°22′07″N 1°29′18″W	1247073	Old Chapel at General Cemetery More images
Old Hall Farmhouse	Brightholmlee	House	1484	25 April 1969	SK2907895104	1132870	Old Hall Farmhouse
Old Queens Head Public House	Sheffield	House	Mid 19th century	1 May 1952	SK3581387254; 53°22′51″N 1°27′47″W	1247088	Old Queens Head Public House More images
Park Hill	Park Hill, Sheffield	Flats	1957-1960	22 December 1998	SK3606487093; 53°22′46″N 1°27′34″W	1246881	Park Hill More images
Portland Works	Highfield, Sheffield	Cutlery Works	Late 1870s	12 December 1995	SK3508686027; 53°22′12″N 1°28′27″W	1271036	Portland Works More images
Right Hand Glasshouse on North West Side of Botanical Gardens	Broomhill, Sheffield	Glasshouse	1837-38	1 May 1952	SK3346486348; 53°22′23″N 1°29′55″W	1270952	Right Hand Glasshouse on North West Side of Botanical Gardens
Sharrow Mills	Sharrow, Sheffield	Managers House	Mid 18th century	28 June 1973	SK3386185857; 53°22′07″N 1°29′33″W	1247589	Sharrow Mills More images
Sheffield United Gas Light Company Offices	Sheffield	Office	1875	28 June 1973	SK3582487518; 53°23′00″N 1°27′46″W	1270948	Sheffield United Gas Light Company Offices More images
Shepherd Wheel and Attached Dam Goit and Weir	Whiteley Woods, Sheffield	Dam	c. 1780	28 June 1973	SK3173485396; 53°21′52″N 1°31′29″W	1255068	Shepherd Wheel and Attached Dam Goit and Weir More images
Terminal Warehouse	Victoria Quays, Sheffield	Canal Warehouse	c. 1819	18 August 1971	SK3598087660; 53°23′04″N 1°27′38″W	1247016	Terminal Warehouse More images
The Mount	Broomhill, Sheffield	House	c. 1970	28 June 1973	SK3343786777; 53°22′36″N 1°29′56″W	1254959	The Mount More images
The Old Bank House and Attached Railings	Sheffield	House	1728	1 May 1952	SK3545887574; 53°23′02″N 1°28′06″W	1255072	The Old Bank House and Attached Railings More images
Turret House 150 Metres West of Manor House Ruins	Manor Park, Sheffield	Pavilion	c. 1574	1 May 1952	SK3749086481; 53°22′26″N 1°26′17″W	1271283	Turret House 150 Metres West of Manor House Ruins More images
West Range at Cornish Place Works	Kelham Island, Sheffield	Courtyard	Late 19th century	28 June 1973	SK3487188326; 53°23′26″N 1°28′38″W	1270928	West Range at Cornish Place Works More images
Wicker Arch and Adjoining Viaduct and Buildings	Wicker, Sheffield	Workshop	1995	28 June 1973	SK3594488075; 53°23′18″N 1°27′40″W	1270747	Wicker Arch and Adjoining Viaduct and Buildings More images
Workshop Ranges and Crucible Furnace Attached to Number 35	Netherthorpe, Sheffield	House	c. 1840	13 June 1988	SK3465887744; 53°23′07″N 1°28′49″W	1270867	Workshop Ranges and Crucible Furnace Attached to Number 35 More images
1 to 15 Paradise Square	Sheffield	House	1787	1 May 1952	SK3530787556; 53°23′01″N 1°28′14″W	1246807	1 to 15 Paradise Square
4 to 12 Paradise Square	Sheffield	House	c. 1771	1 May 1952	SK3535787590; 53°23′02″N 1°28′12″W	1271131	4 to 12 Paradise Square
14 to 22 Paradise Square	Sheffield	House	MID C20	1 May 1952	SK3534187602; 53°23′03″N 1°28′13″W	1246808	14 to 22 Paradise Square
17 and 19 Paradise Square	Sheffield	House	Late 18th century	1 May 1952	SK3529787565; 53°23′02″N 1°28′15″W	1271132	17 and 19 Paradise Square
24 Paradise Square	Sheffield	House	c. 1771	1 May 1952	SK3530087595; 53°23′03″N 1°28′15″W	1246809	24 Paradise Square
War Memorial	Sheffield	War memorial	1925	28 June 1973	SK3520687182	1271299	War Memorial More images
