= Cementation Furnace, Sheffield =

Steel making furnace in Sheffield, South Yorkshire, England

Coordinates: 53.3874°N 1.4775°W

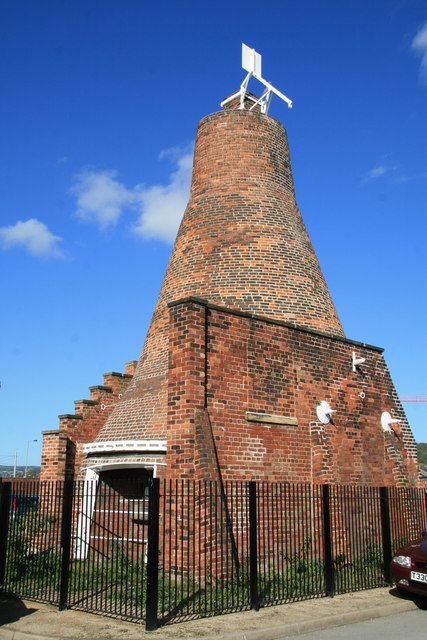

The Cementation Furnace in Sheffield is a Grade II Listed Building and is the only example of this type of steel making furnace to survive intact in Great Britain. It is situated on Doncaster Street in the St Vincent's Quarter of Sheffield city centre, close to Shalesmoor tram stop of the South Yorkshire Supertram.

== History ==
The furnace was built in 1848 to produce steel by the cementation process by the local steel firm of Daniel Doncasters and Sons, a firm which had been established in Sheffield in 1778. By 1860 there were 250 cementation furnaces in Sheffield capable of producing 80,000 tons of blister steel and the large conical structures were a characteristic feature of the city's industrial landscape. The furnace on Doncaster Street is the only remaining example which is undamaged although there are two other sites in the immediate area which have examples which are partially intact, these being at Bower Spring and Millsands. The Doncaster Street furnace operated throughout World War II and a blackout cover was fitted to the furnace outlet as a precaution during air raids, this is still in place today (painted white). The furnace ceased operation in 1951.

== Present day ==
After standing unused for 40 years the furnace was restored in 1992/93 with financial assistance from the HSBC (then Midland) Bank. The furnace is surrounded by low fencing and a locked gate with the key being available from the curator at the nearby Kelham Island Museum.
