= Hooton Pagnell Hall =

Historic building in Hooton Pagnell, England

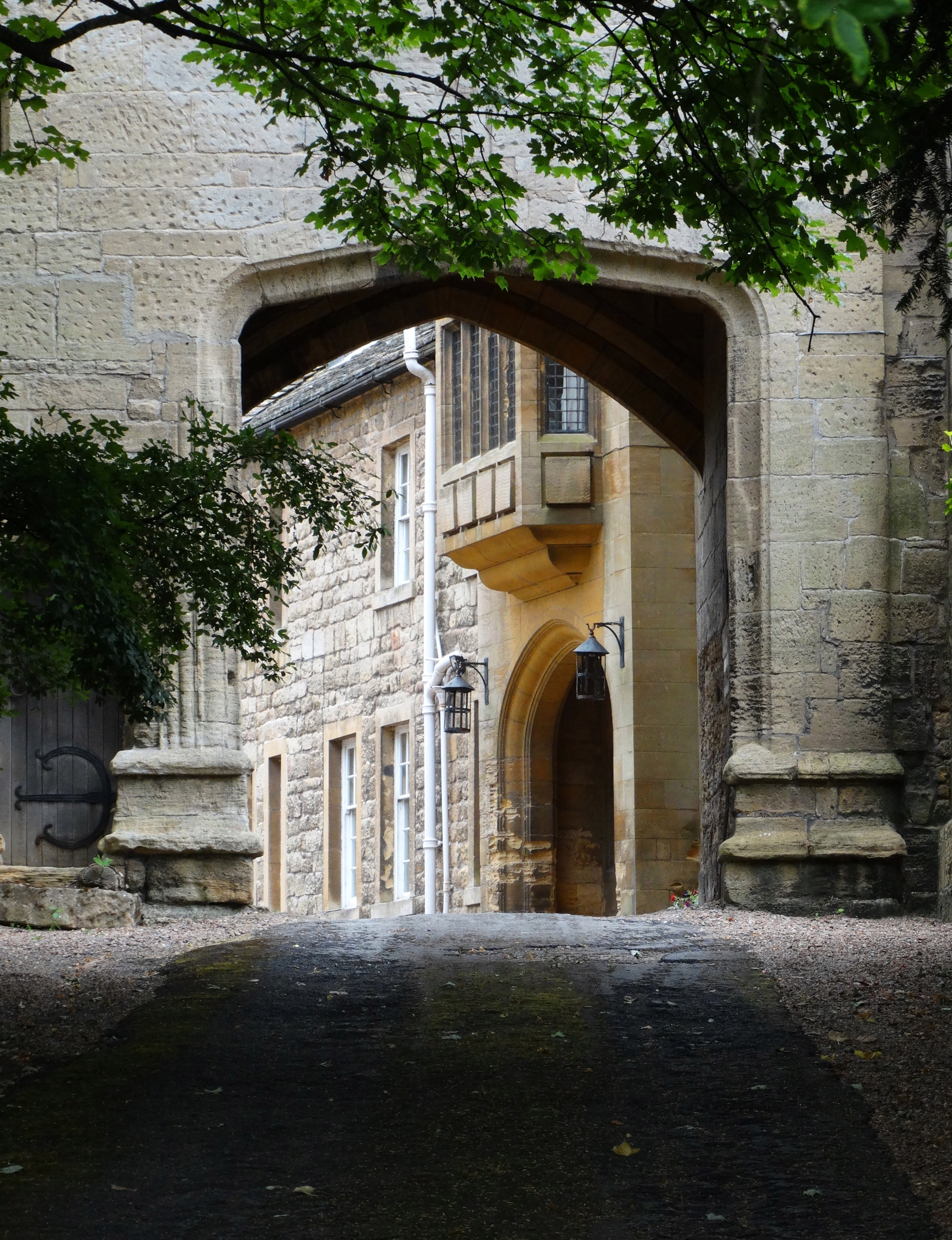
- The front of the hall, seen through the 14th century gatehouse

- Location within South Yorkshire

General information
- Location: Doncaster, England
- Coordinates: 53.565213°N 1.268210°W
- Construction started: 14th century
- Owner: Warde-Norbury Family Trust

Website
- https://hootonpagnellhall.com/

Listed Building – Grade II*
- Official name: Hooton Pagnell Hall including Archway Flat, Nos 1 and 2 Hall Cottages, Ground-Floor Flat, First-Floor Flat and Pump End
- Designated: 27 May 1953
- Reference no.: 1192355

Hooton Pagnell Hall is a historic house in Hooton Pagnell, near Doncaster, South Yorkshire, occupied by the Warde family since the 18th century.

== History ==
Before the Norman invasion, the estate was held by Edwin, Earl of Mercia. In 1071, ownership passed to Sir Ralph de Paganell, whose name is reflected in the current name of the house and village.

In 1190, Frethesant Paganel married Sir Geoffrey de Luterel, and the estate passed into the Luttrell family, whose arms appear above the gateway of the house. The estate remained with the Luttrells until 1406, then passed through various owner before coming into the possession of the Crown during Richard III's reign.

The core of the current building dates to the 14th century.

It was purchased from the Gifford family in 1605 by Sir Richard Hutton of Goldsborough Hall. Hutton's descendant Col Robert Byerley (known as the owner of the Byerley Turk thoroughbred stallion) began negotiations around 1681 with Sir Patience Warde, Lord Mayor of London, to purchase the estate. The purchase was eventually completed in 1703 by his nephew, also called Patience Warde.

The main staircase is 17th century, and was brought to the house from Palace Yard in Coventry in the 19th century.

With increased wealth, the Hall was extensively remodelled in the 19th and early 20th centuries by Julia Warde-Aldam, who remodelled the hall to its current gothic appearance, and added an East Wing as well as a gatehouse onto the road in a gothic style. During the First World War, the house was opened as Hooton Pagnell Auxiliary Military Hospital, with Warde-Aldam as commandant and matron.

Following the sale of many large properties to meet death duties, the estate is now owned by a family trust. Mary Betty Norbury received the Hooton Pagnell estate as a gift from her father, Col William St Andrew Warde-Aldam, in 1952, and she and her husband assumed the surname of Warde-Norbury by Royal Licence in 1958. It is now owned by Mark Warde-Norbury and his wife Lucianne.

== See also ==
- Grade II* listed buildings in South Yorkshire
- Listed buildings in Hooton Pagnell
