= St Vincent's Quarter =

Area in Sheffield, England

Coordinates: 53.385°N 1.477°W

St Vincent's Quarter is one of Sheffield's eleven designated quarters, centring on and named after St Vincent's Church. Primarily an office and industrial location, its regeneration has increased rapidly over the past few years, with the new Metier residential block and Velocity Village. office and residential accommodation springing up on the north side of Tenter Street. Despite recent development, the area still contains several dilapidated or derelict workshops and prostitution is common in the area.

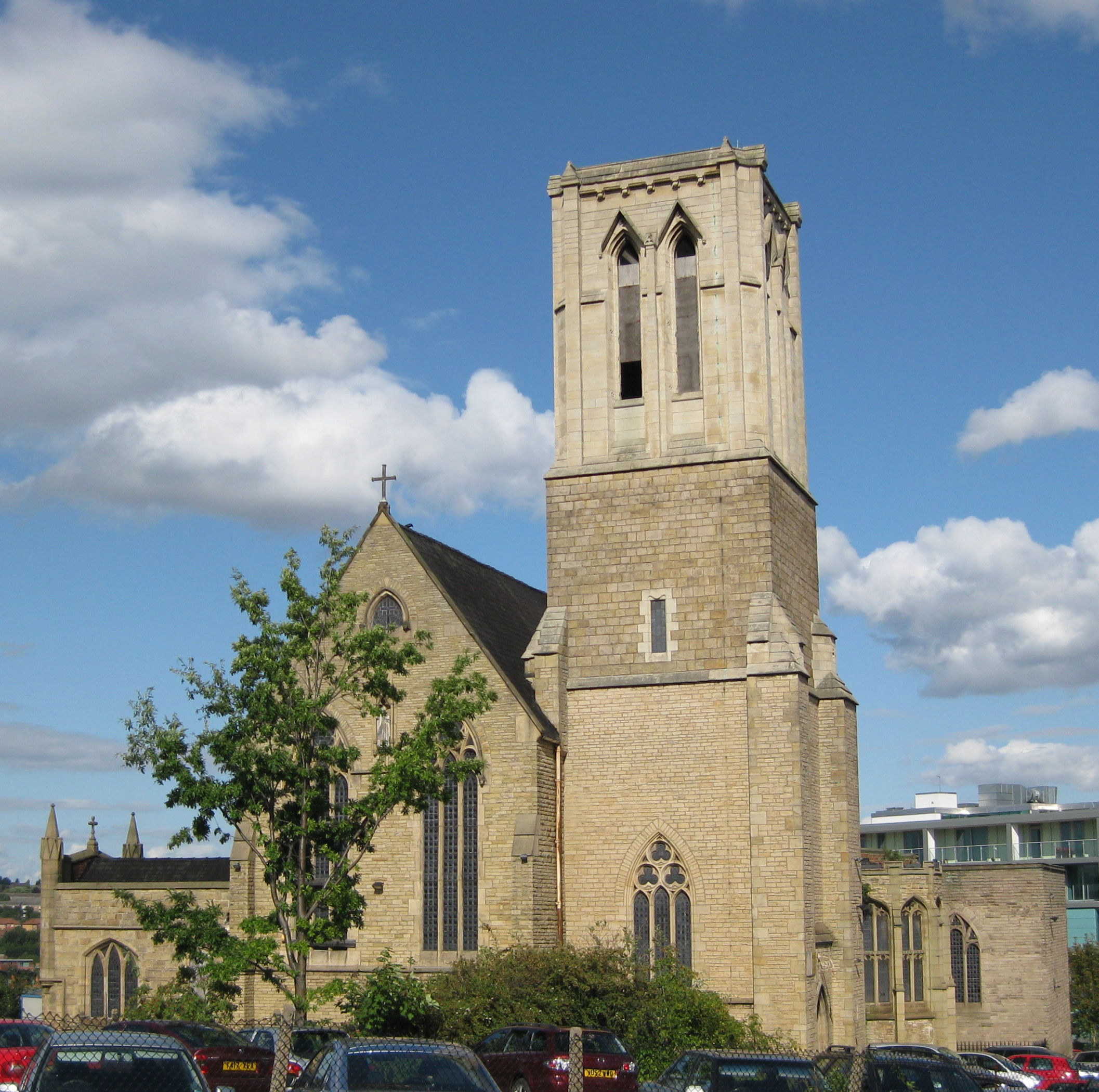
St Vincent's Church, for which the area is named.

It is broadly triangular in shape, with Tenter Street and Broad Lane to the south, Netherthorpe Road and Hoyle Street to the north-west and Shalesmoor, Moorfields, Gibraltar Street and West Bar to the north-east.

Currently, the A57 runs through the middle of the quarter but upon the completion of the Northern Relief Road, a dedicated route will be provided around the quarter, with the intention of improving the character of the area.

It currently has three designated character areas: Furnace Hill, Solly Street, Well Meadow.

The quarter played an important part in Sheffield's industrial heritage and examples include the cementation furnace on Doncaster Street and the crucible furnace and buildings at 35 Well Meadow Street.

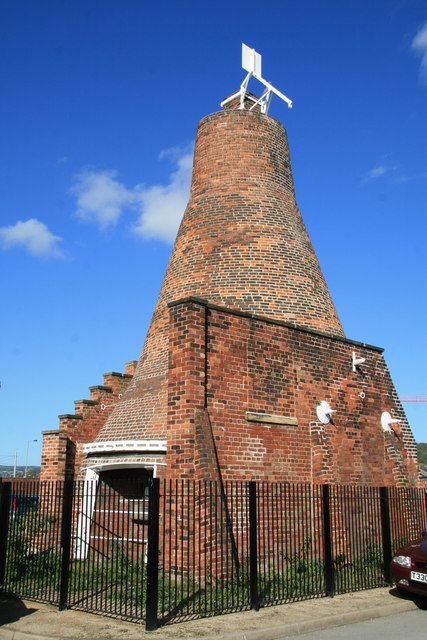
Cementation Furnace within this area
