= Listed buildings in Brierley and Grimethorpe =

Brierley is a town and Grimethorpe is a village in the North East Ward in the metropolitan borough of Barnsley, South Yorkshire, England. The ward contains six listed buildings that are recorded in the National Heritage List for England. Of these, one is listed at Grade II*, the middle of the three grades, and the others are at Grade II, the lowest grade. The listed buildings consist of three houses, a farmhouse, a milepost, and a church.

== Key ==
Grade	Criteria
II*	Particularly important buildings of more than special interest
II	Buildings of national importance and special interest

== Buildings ==
Name and location	Photograph	Date	Notes	Grade
Grimethorpe Hall; 53.58177°N 1.38174°W		c. 1669	A house that has been altered, it is in red brick with sandstone dressings, on a plinth, with quoins, bands, and a twin roofs in Welsh slate, the gables at the front linked by a coped parapet. There are two storeys and an attic, and a half-basement at the rear, The front has five bays, and steps lead up to a central doorway with a quoined and moulded surround, plinth blocks, and imposts. Flanking the middle bay are two-storey pilasters and a cornice, the pilasters decorated with inset stones. The windows on the front are sash windows, and at the rear are cross-mullioned windows, and a gabled dormer.	II*
Brierley Manor Farmhouse; 53.58514°N 1.36626°W		18th century	The farmhouse, which retains earlier fabric, is in sandstone, partly rendered, and has a Welsh slate roof and cellars. The main range has two storeys, and there is an L-shaped plan, with a three-storey rear wing. The main range has a chamfered plinth and quoins, and the right part projects. Opposite the entrance to the rear wing is a medieval stair turret that has a chamfered plinth, a projecting band, a window, and a lean-to roof. The windows throughout the building are a mix of sashes and casements, and some windows are mullioned.	II
Bridge Farmhouse; 53.57879°N 1.37717°W	—	Early 19th century	A farmhouse in sandstone with an earlier core, it has paired moulded gutter brackets and a Welsh slate roof. There are two storeys, three bays, a rear outshut, and a rear wing. The central doorway has a plain surround, a frieze and a cornice, and the windows are sashes. In the outshut are the remains of mullioned windows.	II
Milepost; 53.59820°N 1.38228°W		Early 19th century	The milepost is on the south side of Barnsley Road (A628 road) to the north of Brierley. It is in sandstone with cast iron overlay, and has a triangular plan and a rounded top. On the top is inscribed "BARNSLEY & PONTEFRACT ROAD" and "BRIERLEY", and on the sides are the distances to Barnsley and Pontefract.	II
Brierley Hall; 53.59534°N 1.38222°W		Mid 19th century	A house, later used for other purposes, it is in sandstone, with hipped stone slate roofs. The main block has a modillion cornice, three storeys, a double-depth plan with twin roofs, and five bays. There is a sill band, and a half-octagonal porch in the left two bays, The windows are sashes, the middle window in the upper floor with an architrave, a frieze, and a cornice. To the left is a projecting wing with two storeys and three bays that is linked to the main bay by a short bay containing a round-headed stair window.	II
St Paul's Church, Brierley; 53.59437°N 1.38091°W		1869	The church is in sandstone with a slate roof, and is in Early English style. It consists of a nave, a south porch, a chancel with a north vestry, and a west steeple. The steeple has a tower with two stages, offset angle buttresses, two-light bell openings with hood moulds, a clock face, flanked by a corbel table under a string course, a pierced balustrade with pinnacles, and a recessed octagonal spire with lucarnes and a weathervane. At the west end is as circular window, and the east window has three lights.	II
