= Grimethorpe Hall =

Manor house in South Yorkshire, England

Coordinates: 53°34′54.4″N 1°22′54.3″W

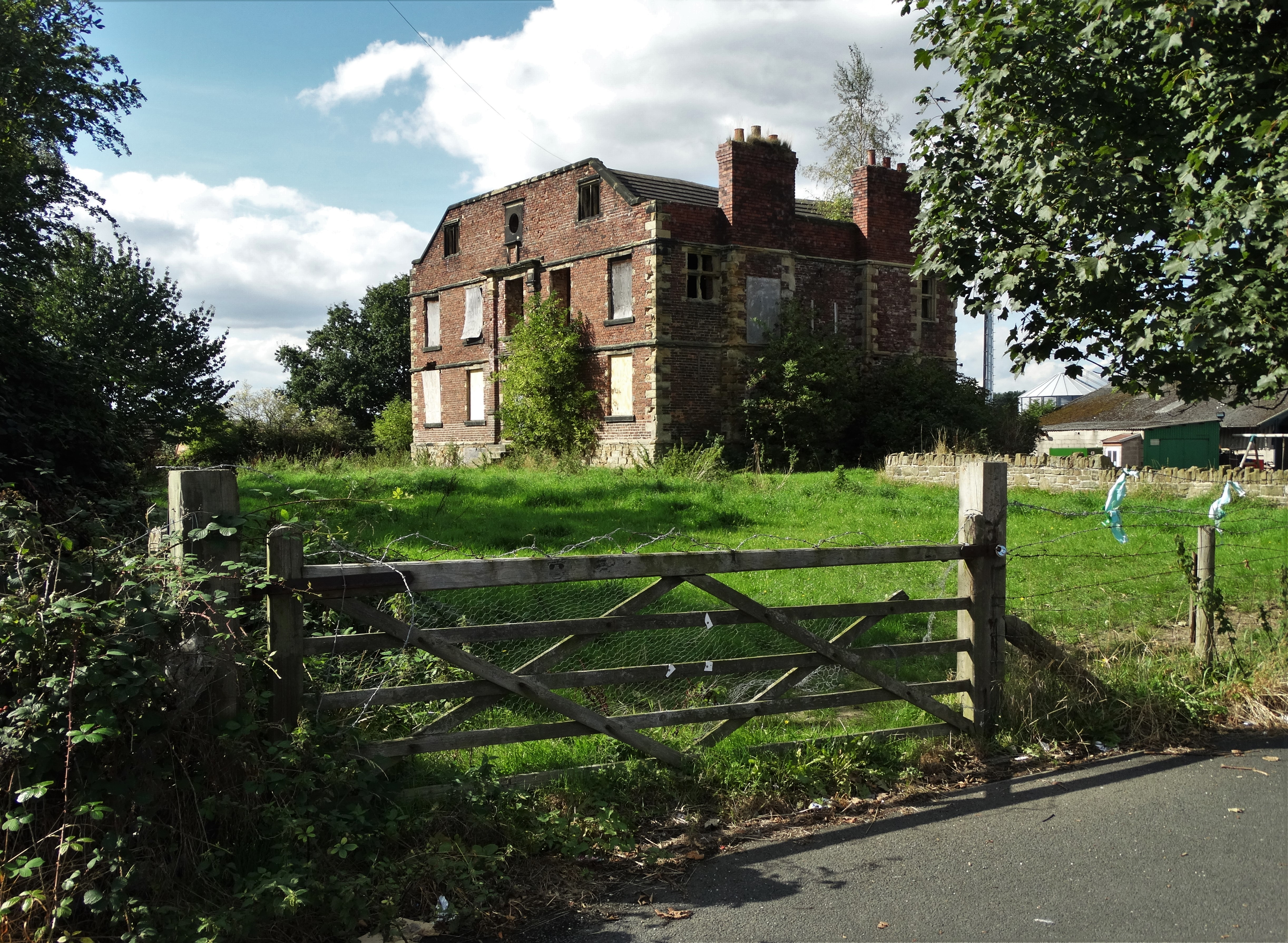
Front (south) and east elevation, pictured in 2016

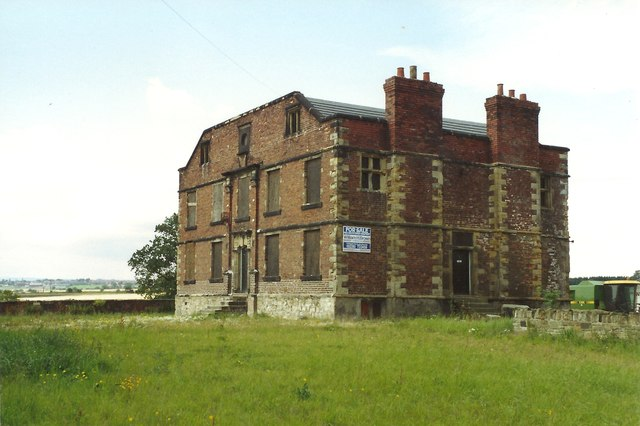
Front (south) and east elevation, pictured in 1992

Grimethorpe Hall is a manor house in Grimethorpe, South Yorkshire, England. Built circa 1670 for Robert Seaton (also spelled Seton), it is thought to be in the style of York architect Robert Trollope. Around 1800 the hall passed to John Farrar Crookes of Tunbridge Wells. It was last used as a house in the 1960s and afterwards was purchased by the National Coal Board. The National Coal Board applied to demolish it in 1981 but, after a campaign by the Ancient Monuments Society, this was unsuccessful. The structure received statutory protection as a grade II* listed building in 1985.

Proposals by later owners to convert the hall into a nursing home, restaurant or social housing came to naught and the hall fell into the ownership of the Crown Estate in 2016 after the company owning it was dissolved. Concerns have since been raised over the structure and a local campaign has been launched in an attempt to restore it.

== Description ==
Grimethorpe Hall is square in plan. Its front (south) elevation is of two storeys and its rear elevation is of three storeys, incorporating a half-basement. The front and side elevations are of red brick laid in English Bond with stone dressing details, while the rear elevation is of sandstone blocks engraved with herringbone patterns. The roof has three ridges, running from front to rear, and is covered in Welsh slate. Gables are visible on the rear elevation but are masked at the front by a brick parapet, with stone coping.

On the front elevation, the ground floor lies partly above the surrounding land; a chamfered band marks the transition between the brickwork and a rubble-stone plinth wall. Plain stone bands run around the perimeter of the structure at the top of the ground floor and first floor levels. The front elevation has five bays and the main entrance, reached by stone steps, lies in the central bay of the ground floor. The door is surrounded by projecting stone moulding and flanked by two Doric-style, two-storey, brick pilasters. A stone pediment above the entrance, at the top of the first floor, was originally curved but was replaced by a straight pediment in the Georgian period. During the same period the original windows were replaced with the sash windows that remain today. The attic rooms have a mullioned window on the parapet wall in between the outer two bays, the central bay features a blind opening.

The rear elevation is of three bays and three storeys. A central door, with curved head, provides access to the basement. The ground floor has a cross mullioned window in the central bay, flanked by two sash windows; the first floor is all cross mullioned windows and the attic floor has mullioned windows on the three gable ends.

The side elevations both feature two projecting chimney stacks. The east elevation has a ground floor doorway, and two cross mullioned windows at the outer bays of the first floor. The west elevation formerly held a door on the left-hand side but this has been partially blocked up to form a window. Above the blocked door is a second cross-mullioned window, all other windows on this elevation have been blocked-up. The parapet wraps around the side elevations.

The interior of the hall features three Doric columns to the right-hand side of the entrance hall. These have been painted but are presumed to be formed of stone. The hall features several old wooden doors with decorative iron hinges.

== History ==
Grimethorpe Hall was built circa 1670 for Robert Seaton. The design of the hall was probably inspired by the work of the York architect Robert Trollope whose design for Norton Conyers House was similar. The hall passed to John Farrar Crookes of Tunbridge Wells around 1800. Some alterations to the hall were made in the 18th, 19th and 20th centuries. The 20th century changes, included replacement of much of the parapet brickwork.

The hall has not been lived in since the 1960s. It was later purchased by the National Coal Board, who applied for permission to demolish it in 1981. The demolition was successfully opposed by the Ancient Monuments Society and the National Coal Board afterwards sold the hall. The hall has become surrounded by dense residential development. The hall received statutory protection as a grade II* listed building on 18 April 1985. Successive owners since then have planned to convert the hall into a restaurant, nursing home or social housing. The last private owner was a company which was dissolved in 2016, leaving the hall to fall into the ownership of the Crown Estate by escheat. The legal position is complicated by an outstanding mortgage on the property. The Crown Estate has stated that it will not carry out any repairs at its cost, but would not object to any being carried out by other parties. As legal action cannot be taken against the Crown, there is no means for the local authority, Barnsley Council to order works or recover costs under listed building legislation.

The property remains without any interested buyer. In winter 2015/16 Historic England carried out a series of inspections to determine priority areas for repair. In 2021 SAVE Britain's Heritage raised concerns over the condition of the hall. A July 2022 Historic England inspection found the roof "full of holes .. providing very little protection to the already fragile building". Local residents have formed a campaign to save the property and it has been considered as a potential new headquarters by the Grimethorpe Colliery Band.

== See also ==
- Listed buildings in Brierley and Grimethorpe
