= Old Bank House =

Building in Sheffield, England

Coordinates: 53.384°N 1.468°W

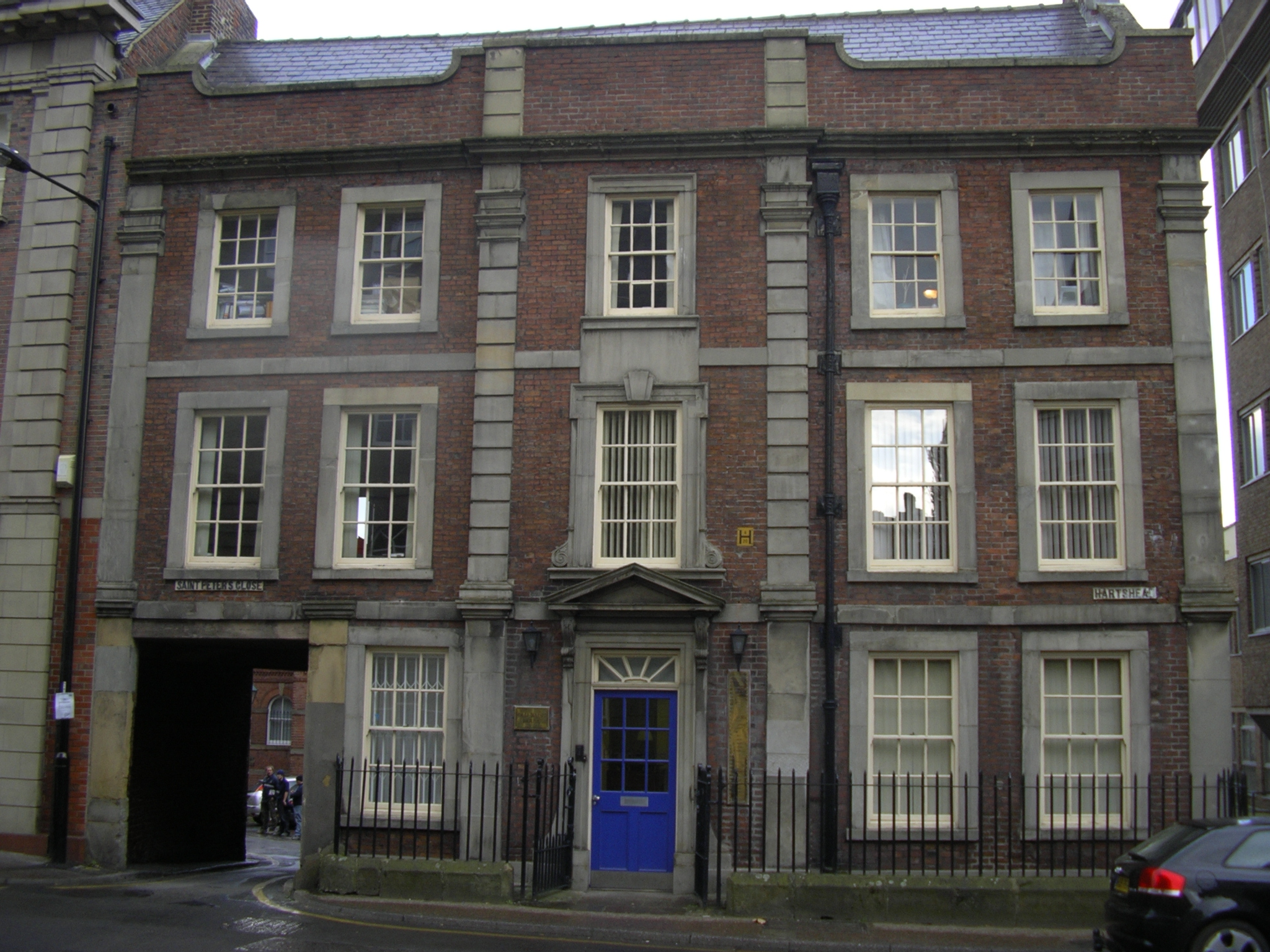
Old Bank House

Old Bank House is the oldest surviving brick-built house in Sheffield City Centre in South Yorkshire, England. It lies on Hartshead, north of the High Street.

Although the Manor Lodge had been partly constructed from brick, the first brick building in Sheffield city centre was not completed until 1696, and was initially much ridiculed. However, by the 1720s, several houses had been rebuilt in brick, and Burrowlee House in Hillsborough had been completed, so the style was no longer a novelty.

The building was constructed in 1728 by the Quaker merchant Nicholas Broadbent. From 1771 until 1782, his grandson Thomas Broadbent ran a bank from the building, having moved to Page Hall.

The three-storey building is divided into five bays, with the central bay brought slightly forward. The central bay and corners of the building are marked with giant pilasters, and a plain pediment tops the facade. St Peter's Close runs through the ground floor of the leftmost bay.

The interior of the building, restored in the 1970s and further improved in 2006 contains some original panelling and plasterwork and is partially Grade I listed. The building is Grade II* listed and is now used as offices by Bank House Chambers, the longest established set of barristers chambers outside of London, situated on the North Eastern Circuit. The chambers began operating in 1862.
