= St Paul's Church, Wordsworth Avenue =

Coordinates: 53.4332°N 1.4693°W

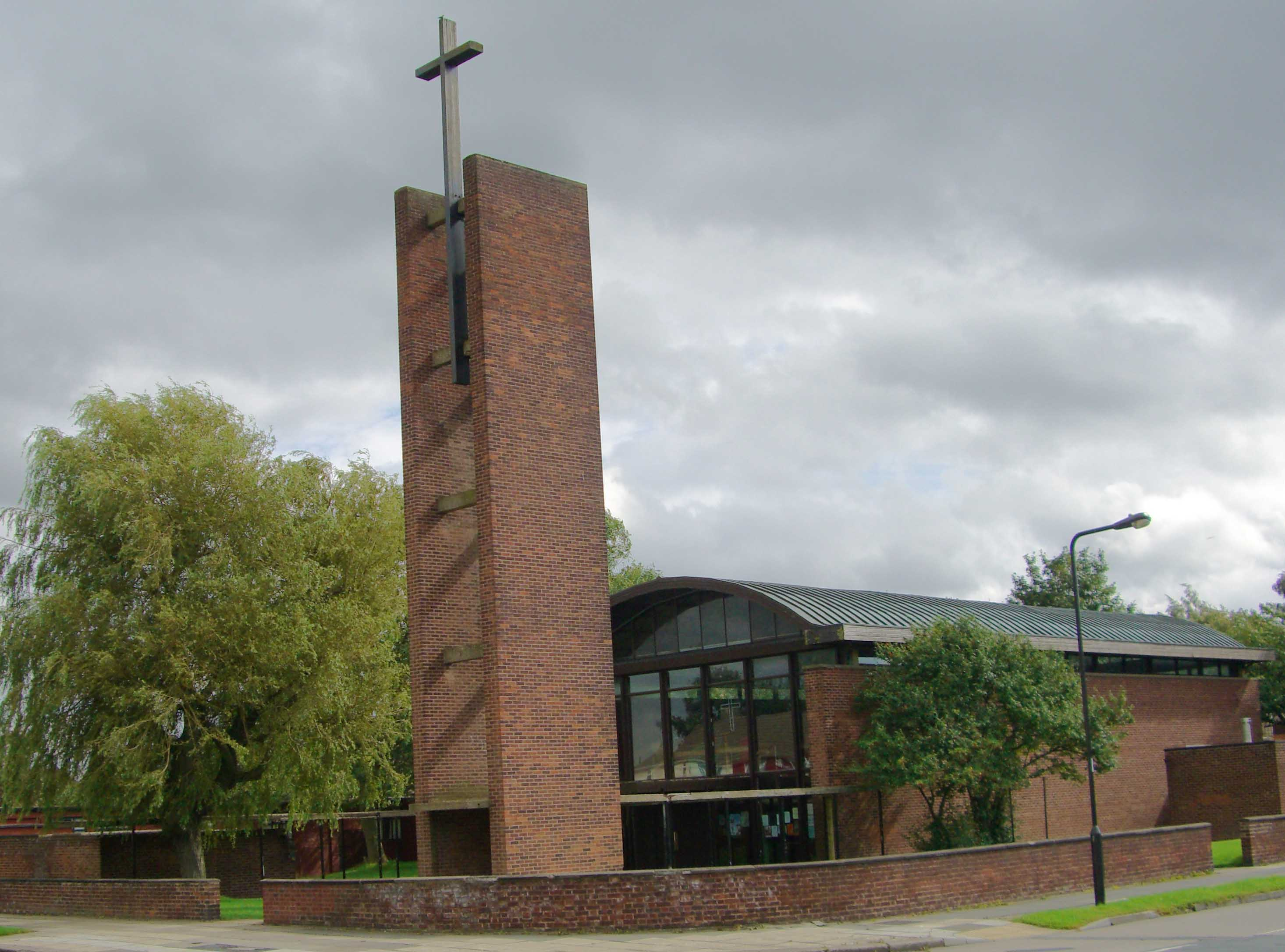
- St Paul's Church, Wordsworth Avenue
- St Paul's Church, Wordsworth Avenue
- OS grid reference: SK 35356 93063
- Denomination: Church of England
- Churchmanship: Broad Church

History
- Dedication: St. Paul

Administration
- Province: York
- Diocese: Sheffield
- Parish: Sheffield

St Paul's Church is situated within the city of Sheffield, South Yorkshire, England, in the suburb of Parson Cross on Wordsworth Avenue. St Paul's is a modern looking post war church which has been designated as a Grade II* listed building.

== History ==
St Paul's was opened in 1959 to serve the New Parson Cross estate which had been constructed on previous greenfield land in the late 1940s as the City of Sheffield cleared its slum housing and expanded into the countryside. The church was designed by the Scottish architect Basil Spence who was forced to work with a limited budget. Spence was working on his most famous design Coventry Cathedral at the same time that he was overseeing the construction of St Paul's.

When St Paul's was opened in 1959 it did not have its own parish and was purely a daughter church to St Mary's, Ecclesfield. However the area around St Paul's was declared a Conventional District within the Ecclesfield parish and in 1973 the separate parish of St Paul, Wordsworth Avenue was created. The new housing estate never had an official name, so the parish is one of the few which is identified by its street address rather than by its district. The parish was badly hit by the collapse of the Sheffield steel industry in the 1980s.

== Architecture ==
Spence's design for St Paul's is quite simple although this is not obvious at first glance. The church is basically two brick walls joined by a shallow barrel vault roof strengthened by diagonal steel bracing. The ends of the church consist almost entirely of glass with Spence integrating some the ideas he had used at St Oswald's, Tile Hill in 1957. To the front of the church is a 49-foot (15 m) high campanile consisting of just two brick walls with concrete ties in between. There is a twenty-foot (6 m) cross on top of the campanile. The church hall stands just to the north within the church grounds. The interior has a balcony reached by steps on which the organ stands. While the altar is screened to give it some privacy from the big end window by a hardwood panel made from African Teak. Spence's personal gift for the church were the altar ornaments which are made from hammered iron.
