= Well Meadow Street Crucible Furnace =

Building in Sheffield, South Yorkshire, England

Coordinates: 53.385543°N 1.480241°W

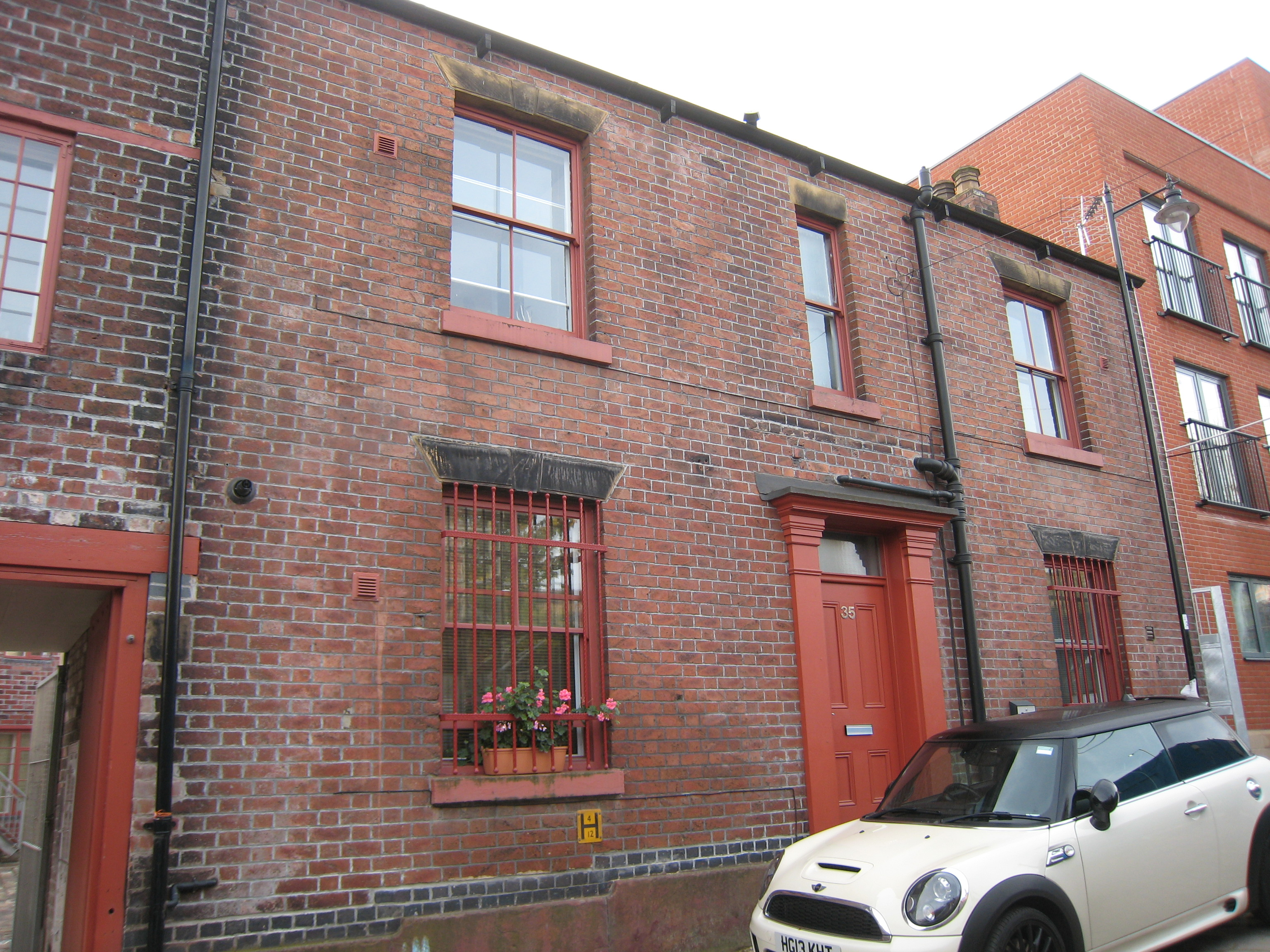
The owner's house, number 35

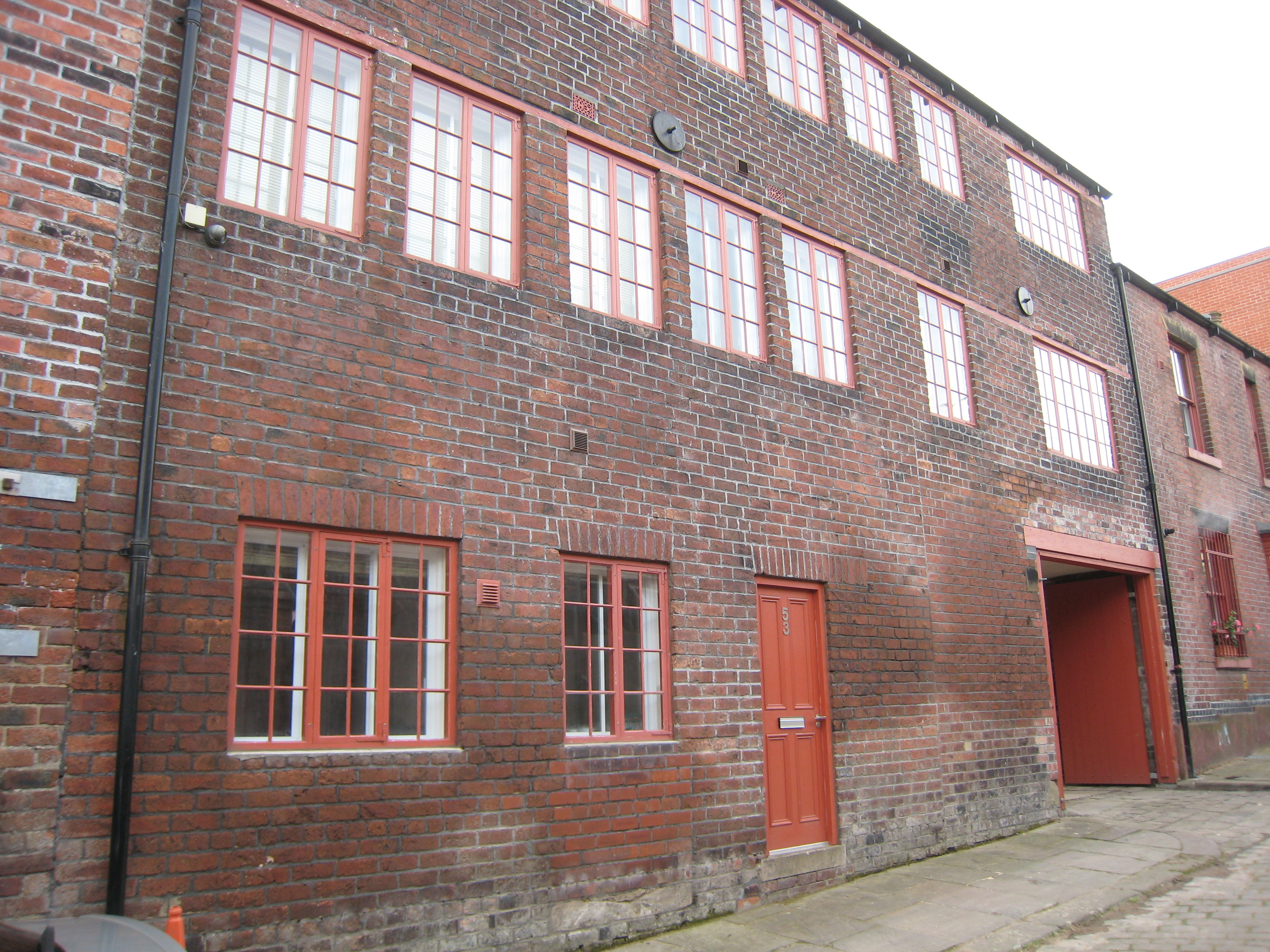
Frontage of the Works

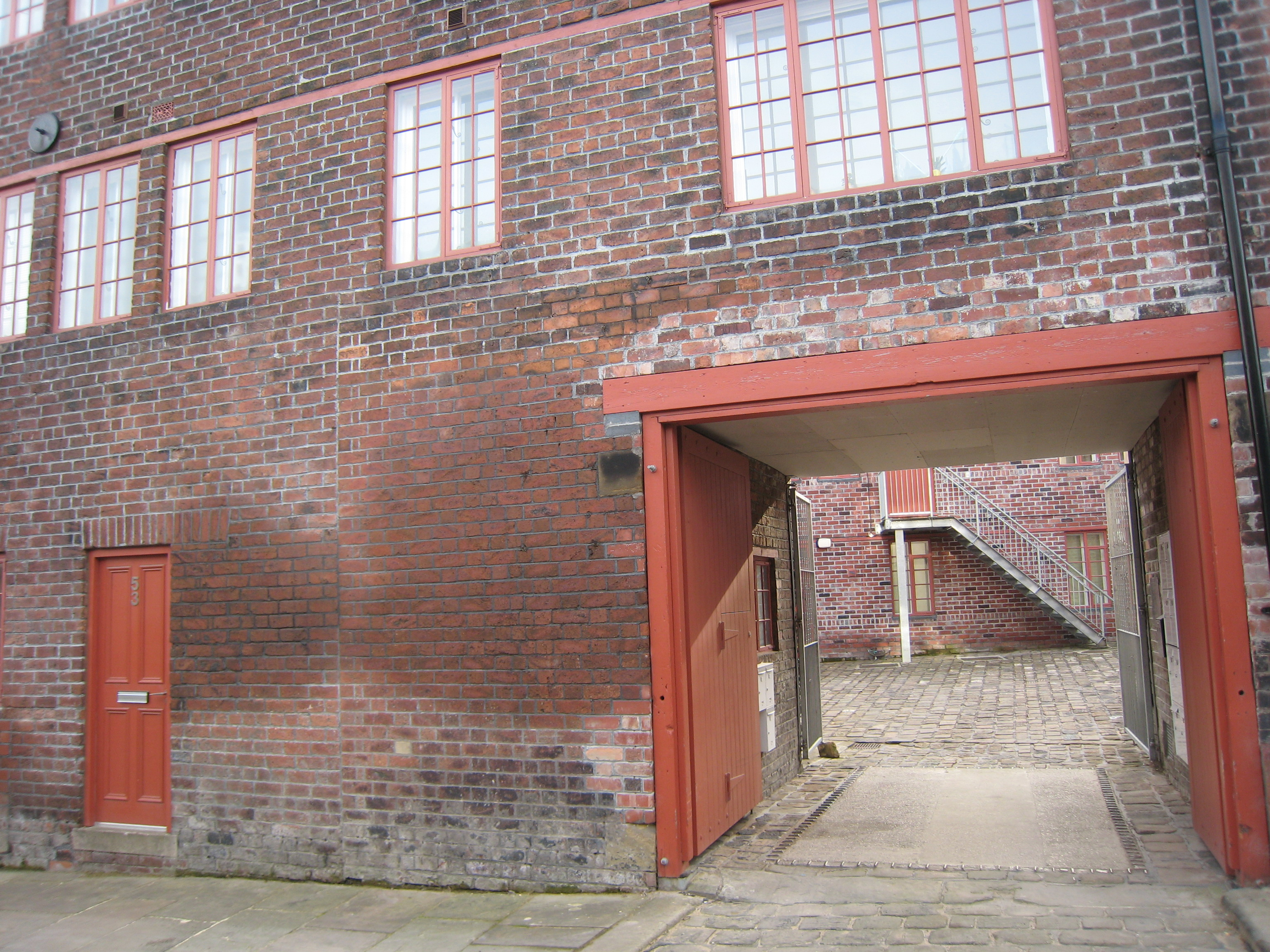
Entry to the courtyard: Joel's Yard

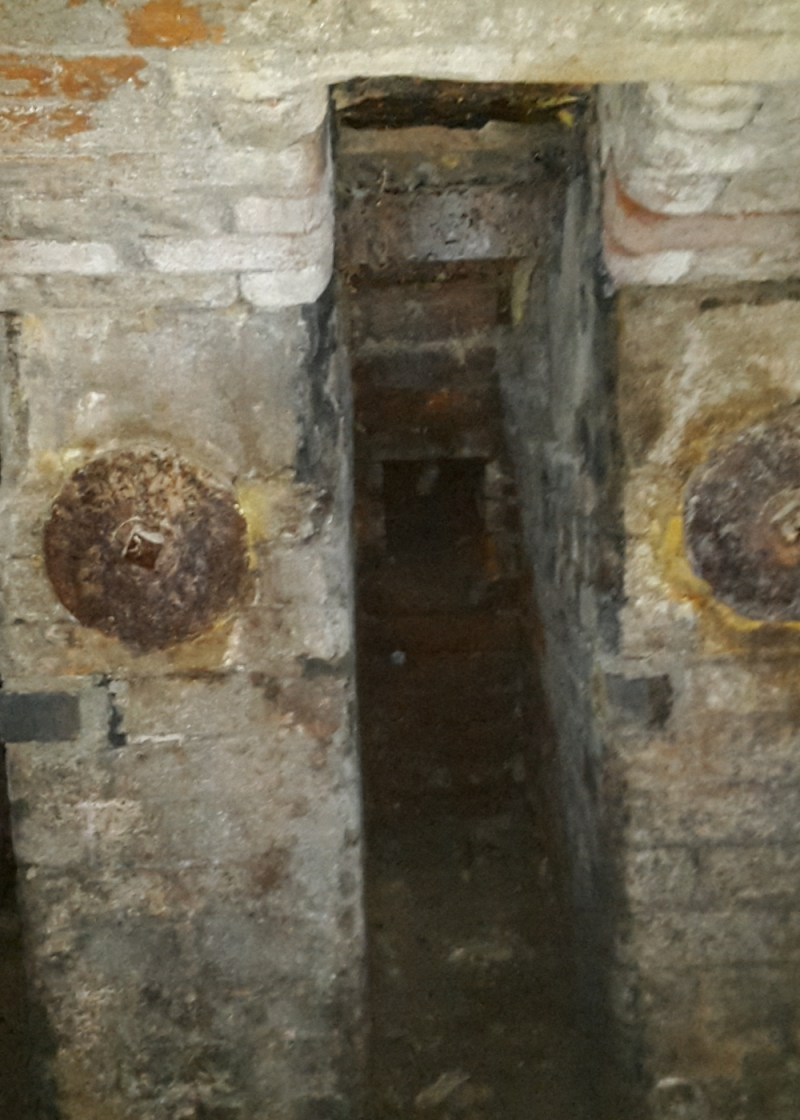
Crucible furnace under Number 51

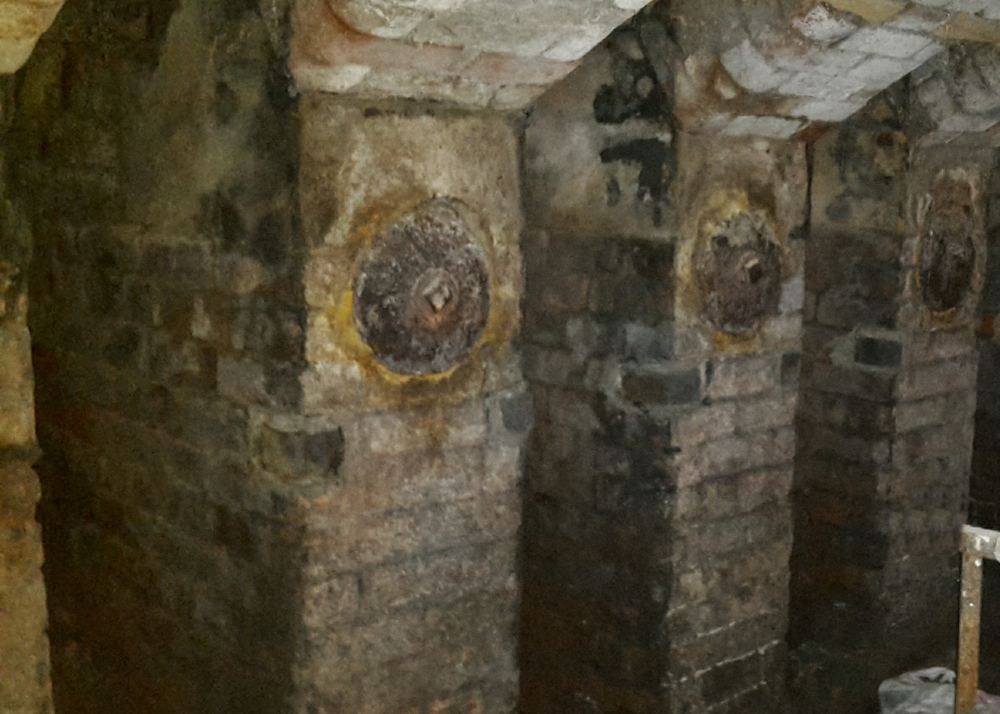
Crucible furnaces in vaulted cellar

35 Well Meadow Street is the site of a house, attached workshops, courtyard complex and a crucible furnace. It is located in the St Vincent's Quarter of the City of Sheffield in England, it is also part of the Well Meadow Conservation Area. The buildings and furnace are grade II* listed buildings because of their importance as part of Sheffield’s industrial heritage and it is regarded as, “One of the most significant of the city’s 19th century industrial monuments”. It has now been converted into residences.

== History ==
The Well Meadow area was developed from farmland, starting in the early part of the 19th century as the industrial city of Sheffield expanded in boundaries. The original development consisted of back-to-back houses combined with small industrial works. 35 Well Meadow Street dates from around 1840 and was built by the established industrial firm of Samuel Peace. The firm started in 1787 with premises in nearby Scotland Street and had a wide diversity of products such as files, saws, cutlery and scythes. When they opened the 35 Well Meadow Street premises it was as steel and file manufacturers' and iron merchants. The manufacturing process included primary steel production in the crucible furnace and the finishing of the final product in the adjacent workshop.

Small scale Crucible steel making remained economically viable into the 1930s although manufacturing at the Well Meadow site ended in 1926. Much of the social housing around the works was demolished in the 1930s under a slum clearance programme with the cleared space was used by small workshops of the metal trades industry. By the 1990s much of 35 Well Meadow Street was disused, boarded up and in a dilapidated state although one block was used for the production of scissors. Recent developments have seen some renovation to the building with new windows being installed. It now stands in the middle of the St Vincent Quarter, an action plan announced in 2004 proposes the restoration of all 16 Grade II* and Grade II listed buildings within the quarter.

== The building ==
The building is constructed from brick with stone dressings and a slate roof. The frontage of the building facing Well Meadow Street has an owner’s house to the right with a three storey workshop to the left incorporating the furnace with its stack, six crucible holes and vaulted brick cellar. The walls of the furnace building have been strengthened with vertical iron straps to withstand the heat. The courtyard to the rear has three storey workshops added in 1853 which were probably used for file cutting.
