= Leah's Yard =

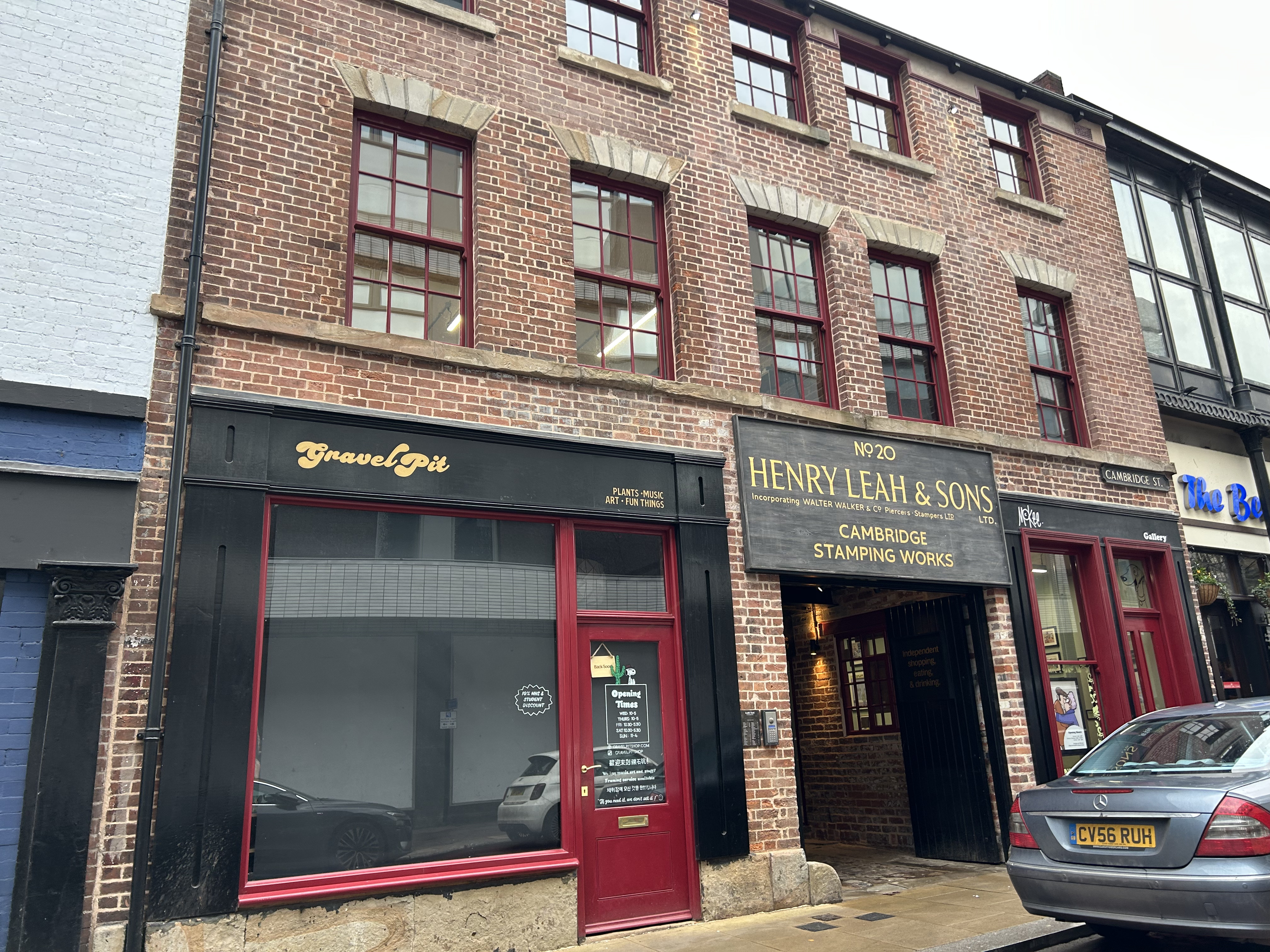
- The redeveloped frontage of Leah‘s Yard on Cambridge Street

- Location within South Yorkshire

General information
- Architectural style: Industrial Revolution manufactory
- Location: Cambridge Street, Sheffield, South Yorkshire, England
- Coordinates: 53.3797°N 1.4723°W
- Current tenants: Various, including Hop Hide Out, Gravel Pit, Chocolate Bar, Mesters’ Market and art galleries
- Opened: Originally opened early 19th century; reopened 2024, following restoration

Other information
- Public transit: B Y City Hall

Website
- https://leahsyard.com/

Leah's Yard is a retail and trading hub, and former collection of small industrial workshops situated on Cambridge Street in the city centre of Sheffield in South Yorkshire, England. The building has been designated as a Grade II* listed building and has been noted for its importance as an example of Sheffield's industrial heritage. It has recently undergone a significant restoration to bring it back into use.

== History ==
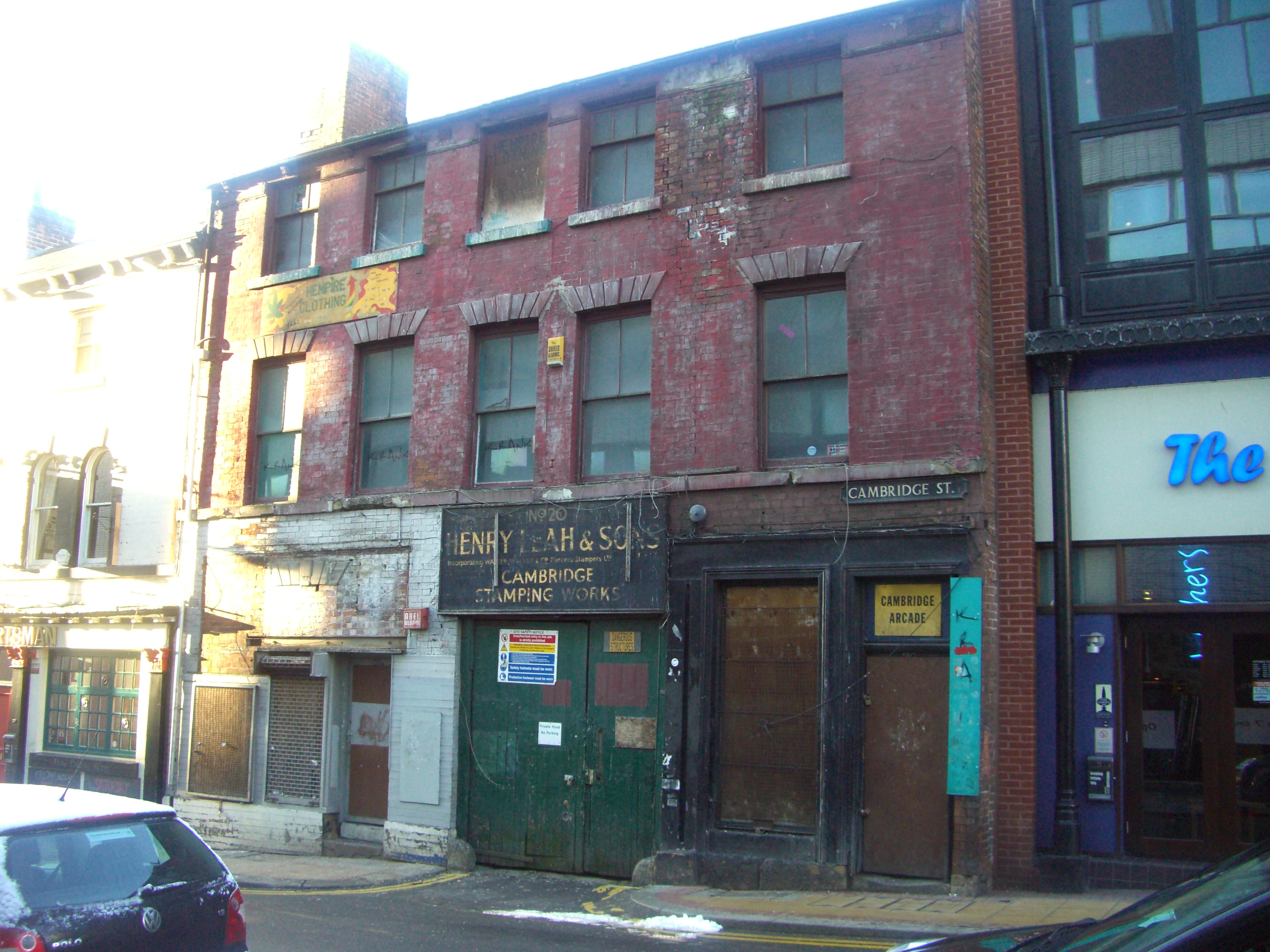
The derelict Cambridge Street frontage, pictured in 2010

Leah's Yard was constructed in the early part of the 19th century as a works for the manufacture of shears and other hand tools. As was typical with small works of this type. Leah's Yard had many different trade occupants and as such the building underwent many alterations and additions which are evident today. Throughout the 19th century the yard was used by a horn dealer (who supplied the cutlery handle making trade), Sheffield platers, knife manufacturers and silver stampers. In the 1880s the building was known as the Cambridge Street Horn Works. In 1892, Henry Leah took over the building as a producer of die stamps for silverware, giving the building the name that it is known by today. Sharing the building at that time was Walter Walker & Co Ltd, who were piercers and stampers; the building was alternatively known as the Cambridge Stamping Works.

At the end of the 19th century, steam power was introduced to run a grinding hull and drop hammers in a silver die stamping shop. The key to the success of buildings such as Leah's Yard was that they could be adapted to provide accommodation for a number of different metal industry trades on the same site. They provided adaptable, cheap work space by crowding buildings into a confined area. By 1905, the workshops around the courtyard of Leah's Yard were occupied by eighteen little mesters whose trades included dram flask manufacturer, hollow ware and silver buffers, palette knife makers, steel fork manufacturer, silver ferrule maker, brass and nickel silver turners, electroplate producer and a cutler.

== The building ==
The front of the Leah's Yard building which faces onto Cambridge Street has a carriage entrance within it, this opens up into a small rear courtyard surrounded by small two and three storey brick workshops. There are external wooden staircases to give access to the upper floors and large casement windows to give plenty of natural light for the workmen.

== Present day ==
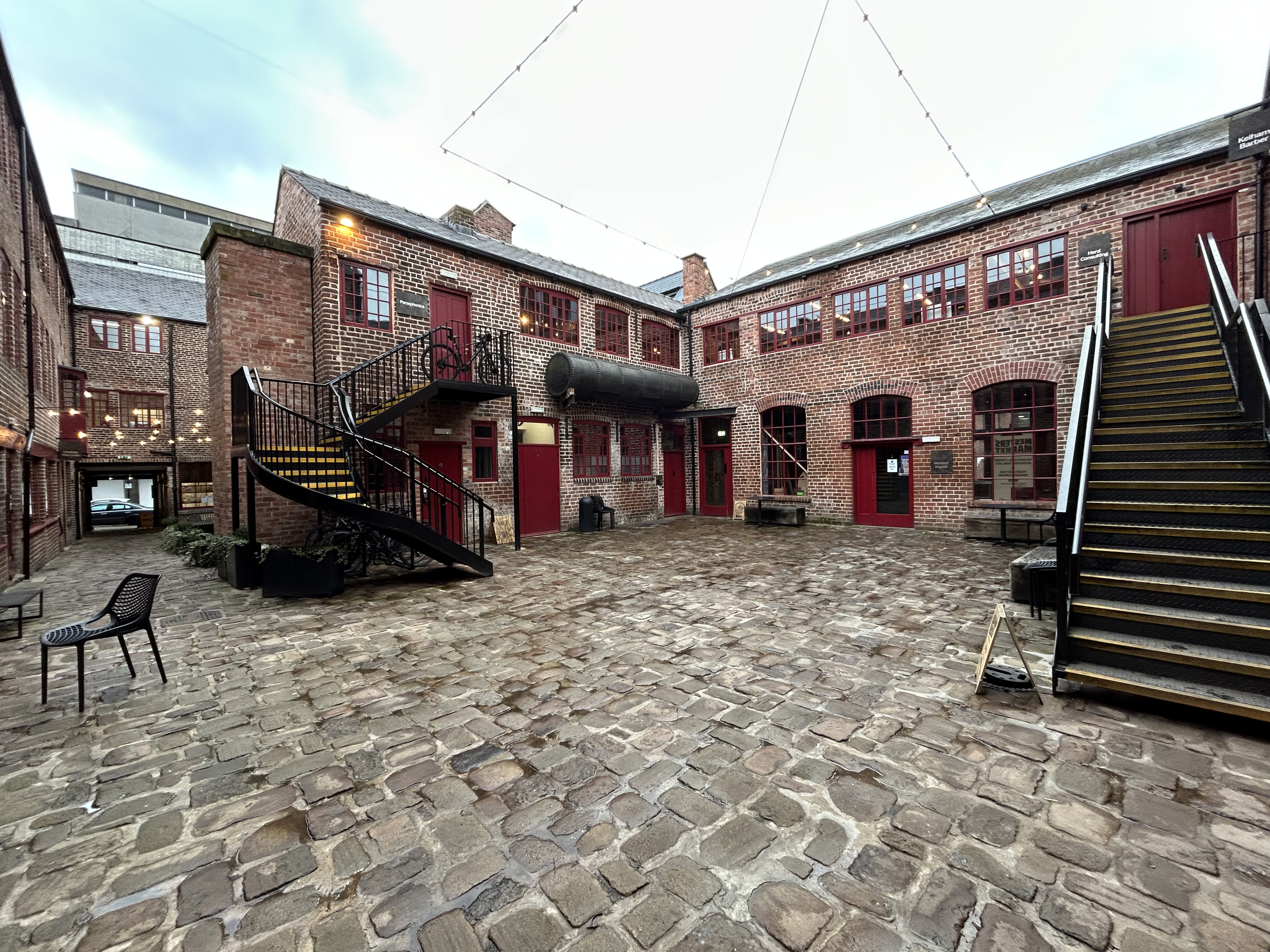
Interior courtyard of Leah's Yard, pictured in 2026

Until recently Leah's Yard stood in a derelict state, having not been used for over 20 years when the lower floor was used as a shop. The building is located next to a public house on Cambridge Street, The Benjamin Huntsman. Older buildings were demolished to make way for the pub. The Leah's Yard buildings were left standing because of their listed building status. The site is part of Sheffield City Council's Heart of The City II project, and in February 2021 it was announced that Sheffield Science Park Company, which operates the similar premises Sheffield Technology Parks, had been successful in their bid to refurbish and operate Leah's Yard. The works are now complete and the complex is home to a range of small independent shops and businesses.
