= Christ Church, Doncaster =

Historic building in South Yorkshire, England

Coordinates: 53°31′24″N 1°07′37″W

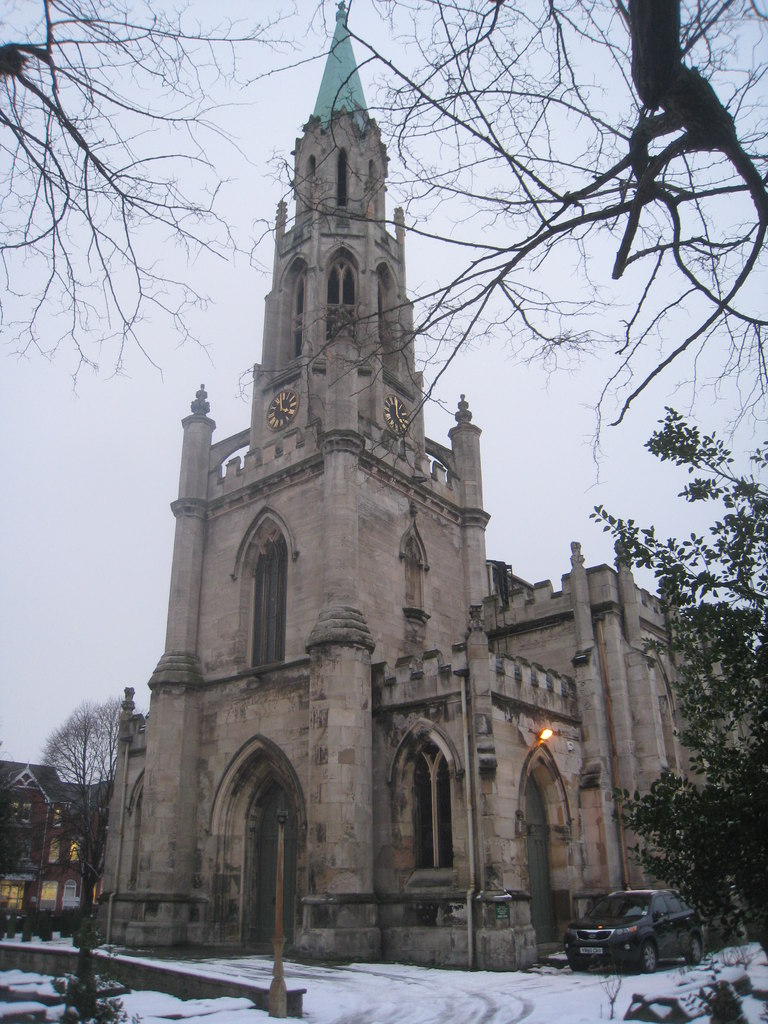
The church, from the south east, in 2013

Christ Church is a historic building in Doncaster, in South Yorkshire in England.

The church was designed in 1827 by William Hurst, and was completed in 1829. It originally had a stone spire, but it was hit by lightning in 1836, and was badly damaged. In the 1850s, George Gilbert Scott enlarged the chancel, and between 1863 and 1865, several stained glass windows designed by Jean Baptiste Cappronier were installed. A new, copper covered, spire was added in 1939, and the church was Grade II* listed in 1950. The church closed in 1989, when repair costs were considered prohibitive. It was purchased by the Reachout Christian Fellowship in 1994, and reopened as a church in 2004.

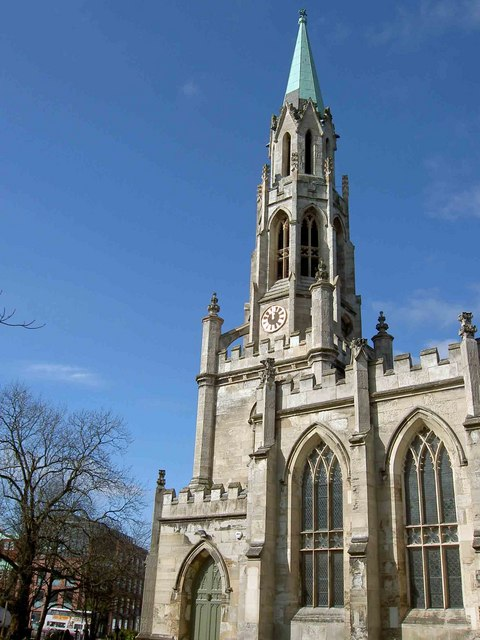
View from the east, in 2010

The church is in the Gothick style. It is built of Roche Abbey limestone, with a slate roof. The tower is at the south, and has four stages, with single storey entrance bays either side. The two lower stages are square in plan, while the upper two are octagonal, and supported by buttresses. The nave is six bays long, and the chancel is at the north end, narrower, and two bays long, with a small vestry on its west side. Inside, the pulpit and pews are original, while the other fittings are 20th century.

== See also ==
- Listed buildings in Doncaster (Town Ward)
