= Butchers Wheel =

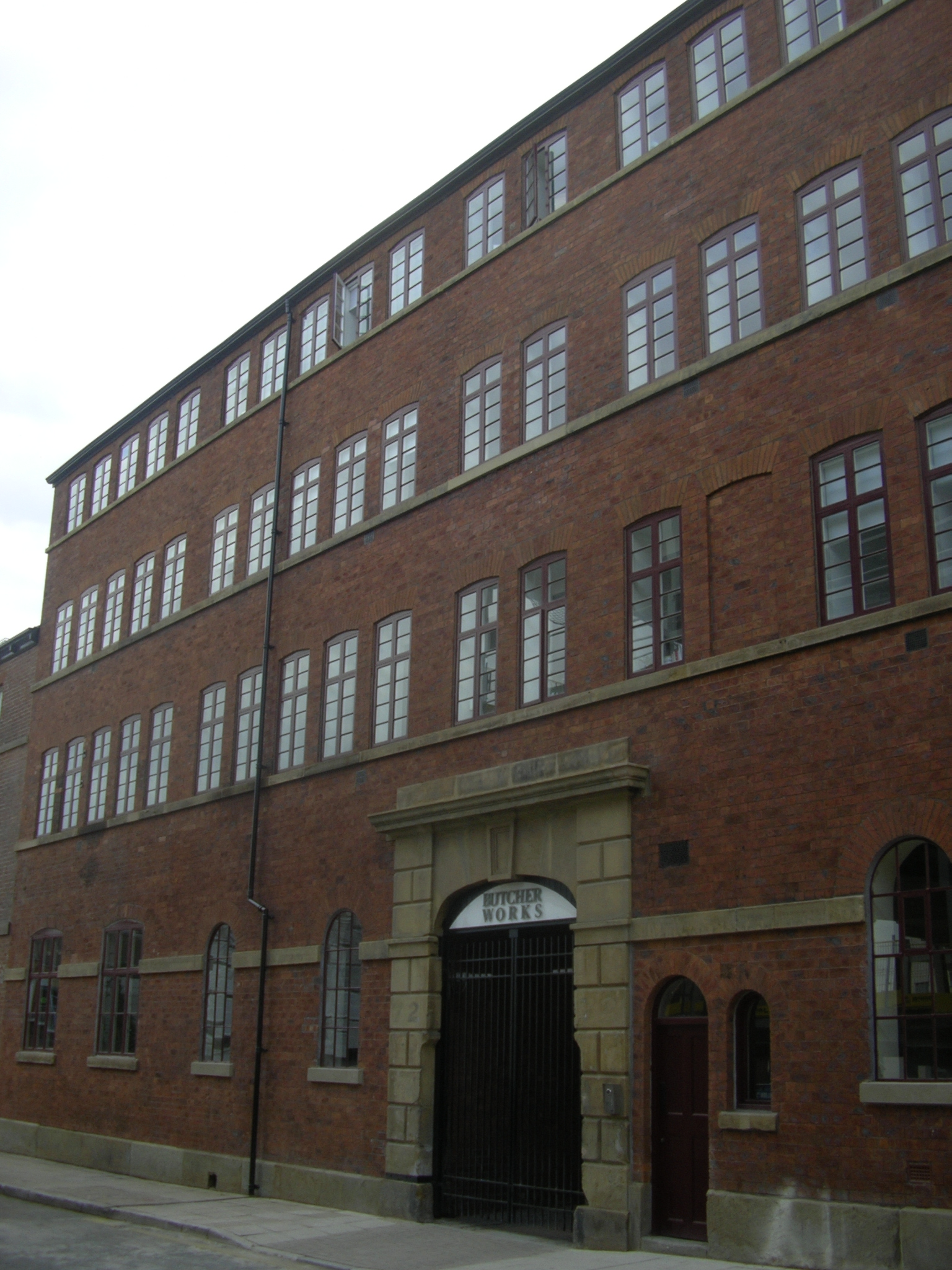
- Arundel Street frontage of Butchers Wheel

- Location within Sheffield
- Alternative names: Butcher Works

General information
- Type: Former cutlery works
- Location: 47 Eyre Lane, Sheffield, United Kingdom
- Coordinates: 53.37693°N 1.46634°W
- Construction started: c.1820

Technical details
- Floor count: 4

Other information
- Public transit: B P Sheffield station; Sheffield Interchange

Butchers Wheel or Butcher Works is a former cutlery and tool factory in Sheffield, South Yorkshire. The last of the manufacturing tenants left in 2004. The building is a listed historic site, and is now used for residential and retail purposes.

== Location ==
The building lies in the Cultural Industries Quarter, between Sheffield City Centre and the River Sheaf. This area was made available for long-term lease by the Duke of Norfolk in the 1770s, intending high-class residential development. However, interest was low and, by the end of the century, much of the district was occupied by small housing doubling as cutlers' workshops. Later in the century, a few, larger, "integrated works" were developed, and Butchers Wheel was one of the first of these.

== Origins ==
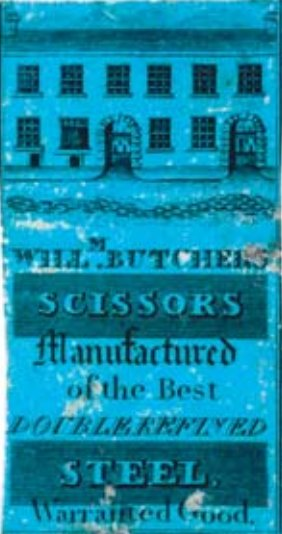
Label from the 1820s advertising William Butcher's scissors, depicting the Eyre Lane frontage of the works at the time

William and Samuel Butcher, sons of cutler James Butcher, began manufacturing steel in Sheffield in the late 1810s. By 1822, William had acquired three adjacent plots of land on Eyre Lane, and constructed a small steelworks, including a purpose-built crucible steel furnace. This was expanded in around 1835 to a three-storey block. A former cottage on the corner of Eyre Lane and Brown Lane, long forming part of the complex, is of similar date.

In 1843, Samuel Butcher held the position of mayor of Sheffield.

== Growth ==
In the 1850s, Butcher bought up the neighbouring steam-powered grinding wheel of J. B. Raworth, incorporating this into the works. This marked a refocusing of activity on the site towards tool, blade and cutlery manufacture, with steel production moving to a new site in the Neepsend area of the city.

During the 1860s, some trade unions in Sheffield used violence against non-members, in what became known as the "Sheffield Outrages". At the time, Butchers Wheel was known as a safe workplace for those who had incurred the opposition of such unions, given that access was only through a single, guarded door.

During the 1860s and 1870s, two four-storey ranges were constructed, one facing Arundel Street, and the other abutting Sterling Works. In similar style to the earlier work, with red brick walls and grey slate roofs, the new buildings created a courtyard at the centre of the site. These buildings were unusually austere for their date, lacking the classical detailing of contemporary works elsewhere in the city. Grinding workshops were on the upper levels, the machinery's weight necessitating arched ceilings of fireproof brick up to one metre thick.

In the centre of the courtyard, a tall chimney was constructed, linked by a curving wall to the edge. This removed fumes from the boiler house which supplied steam power to the entire works. According to English Heritage, power was transmitted by a system of belts and pulleys on the outside walls. In the 1950s, this was decommissioned and electric power was introduced.

== Decline ==
By the early twentieth century, works such as Butchers Wheel were dwarfed by major industrial complexes in the Lower Don Valley. Cutlery manufacture continued, although precision instrument making became increasingly important. In the 1920s, Durham Duplex manufactured safety razors in part of the building. In 1988, some cutlery processes still took place in the works, but they gradually fell into disrepair, the last tenant moving out in 2004. The building was also used for filming, including Asylum, Silent Witness and Micawber.

== Conversion ==
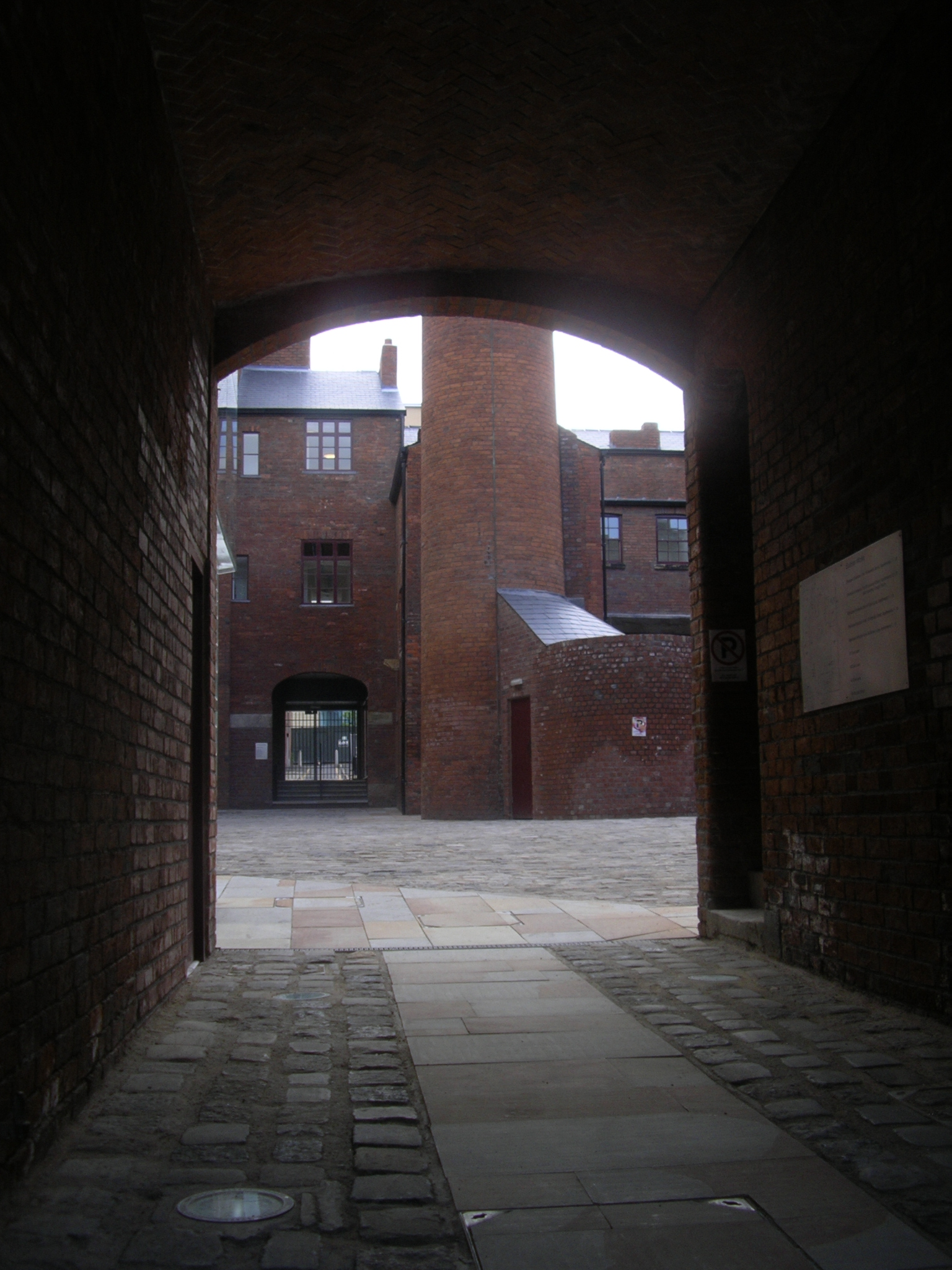
View into the courtyard of Butchers Wheel

The works were Grade II listed in 1988, then upgraded to Grade II* in 2009. They were converted to residential usage in the 2000s, with part of the ground floor housing the Academy of Makers workshops and gallery, and a cafe. Work was completed in 2007, the building being officially opened by the Lord Mayor of Sheffield, Arthur Dunworth.

During restoration, a Bramah flush toilet was discovered, as was a hand forge, complete with anvil and bellows.
