= St Michael and All Angels Church, Great Houghton =

Coordinates: 53.554°N 1.351°W

- St Michael and All Angels Church
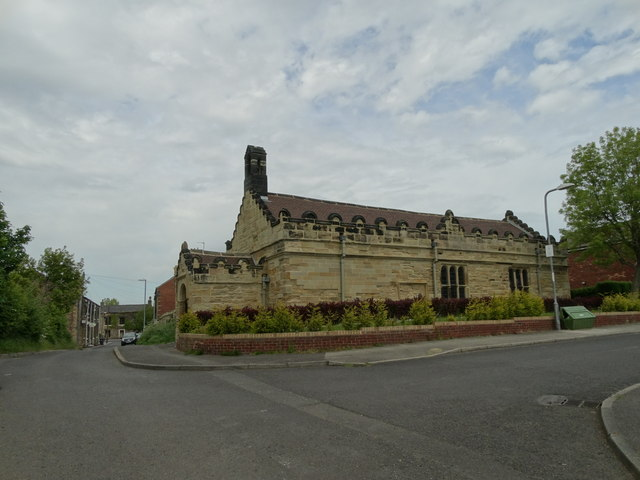

- Location within South Yorkshire
- OS grid reference: SE429066
- Location: Great Houghton, South Yorkshire
- Country: England
- Denomination: Church of England
- Website: www.darfieldallsaintschurch.org.uk/st-michael-and-all-angels/

History
- Founded: c. 1650

St Michael and All Angels Church is the parish church of Great Houghton in South Yorkshire.

The church is dedicated to St Michael, and was originally a private chapel and was built by Sir Edward Rodes, the High Sheriff of Yorkshire, who was a conspicuous Parliamentarian. It was built about 1650 and used for worship by his family and the tenants of his land.

Sir Edward was a great friend of Oliver Cromwell, when he was the Lord Protector of England. He served in Cromwell's Privy Council and was also the Colonel of his Cavalry. Cromwell visited the church on its completion and approved of its simple design. Sir Edward died on 19 February 1666 and is buried in Darfield Church. His Coat of Arms appeared in stone on the east gable of the church. This mysteriously disappeared over the years but the space where it lay still remains.

The first religious ceremony in the chapel was the baptism of one of the younger sons of Sir Edward by Mr Edward Bowles of York, one of the most eminent Presbyterian clergy of his day. Richard Taylor was the first officiating minister as Chaplain to the Rodes family. He had been prevented from exercising his ministry in public by the Act of Uniformity. The Rodes family were great patrons of nonconformity. The chapel at Great Houghton must have been well known throughout the country as a haven for persecuted clergy of the period. The chapel had a succession of non-conforming ministers who existed under Rode's protection.

The chapel remained private for many years and it was not until 1849 that it became ‘Episcopally licensed’ for worship. It only became part of the Church of England (under Darfield parish) in 1906 and the first Anglican service was a Holy Communion which took place on 24 November 1908.
