= Carbrook Hall =

Listed house in South Yorkshire, England

Coordinates: 53°24′20″N 1°25′0″W

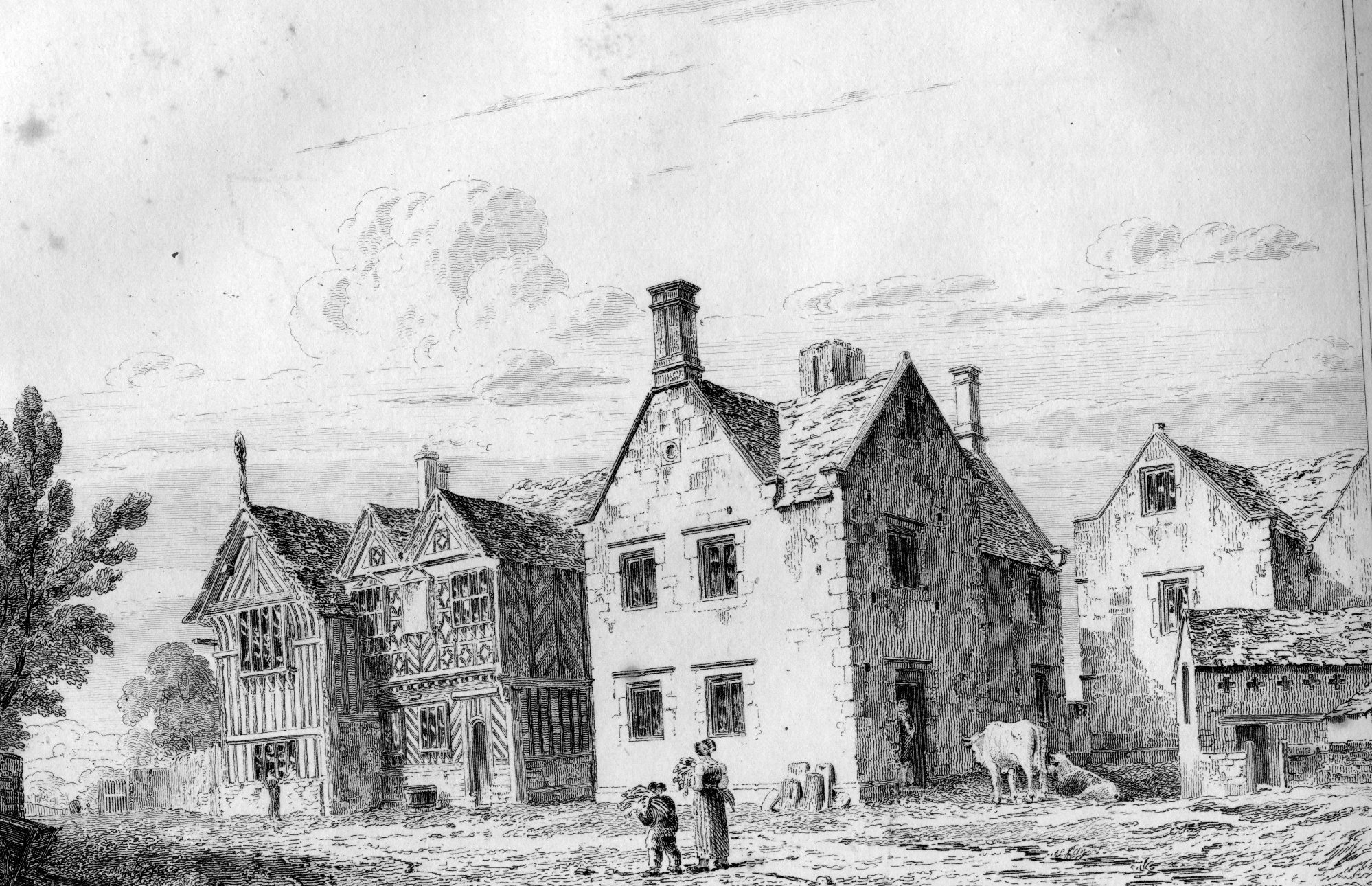
Carbrook Hall c. 1819

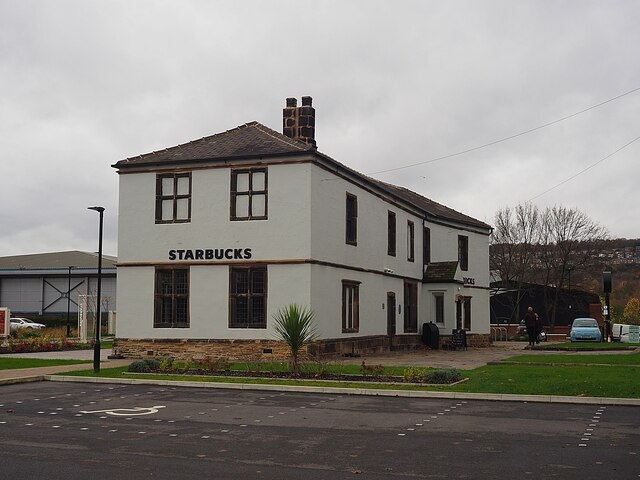
Carbrook Hall

Carbrook Hall is a historic house in Sheffield, England. Located in the Carbrook district of the city, the original building was owned by the Blunt family from 1176. This was rebuilt in 1462, and was bought by Thomas Bright (Lord of the manor of Ecclesall) in the late 16th century. His descendant, John Bright, was an active Parliamentarian during the English Civil War, and the building was used as a Roundhead meeting place during the siege of Sheffield Castle. The Bright family continued to play a prominent role in Sheffield, however, by the end of the eighteenth century the gentry line had died out. Writing in 1819 Joseph Hunter, a minister and antiquarian from Sheffield wrote "the hall at Carbrook...has been deserted by its owners for more than a century but still retains traces of its former consequence".

Most of the building was demolished in the 19th century, what survives is a Grade II* listed stone wing that was added c. 1620.

In recent times, the building served as a public house. Planning permission was granted in November 2018 to turn the building into a Starbucks drive-through and coffeehouse. The original features of the building, such as plaster mouldings and wood panelling, were retained.

== See also ==
- Listed buildings in Sheffield
