= Onesacre Hall =

House in Sheffield, England

Coordinates: 53.4369°N 1.5539°W

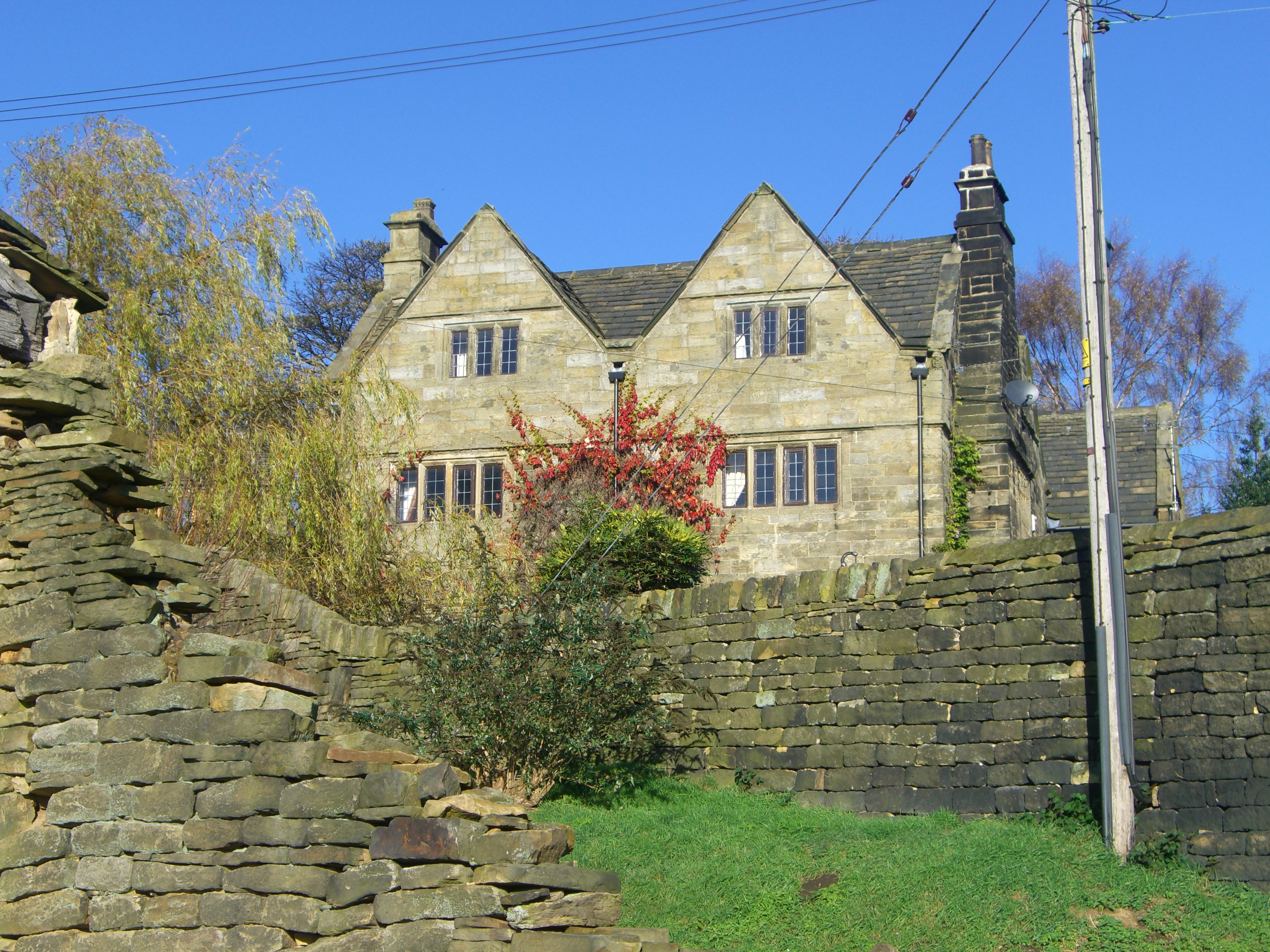
The halls gabled southern end seen from Green Lane.

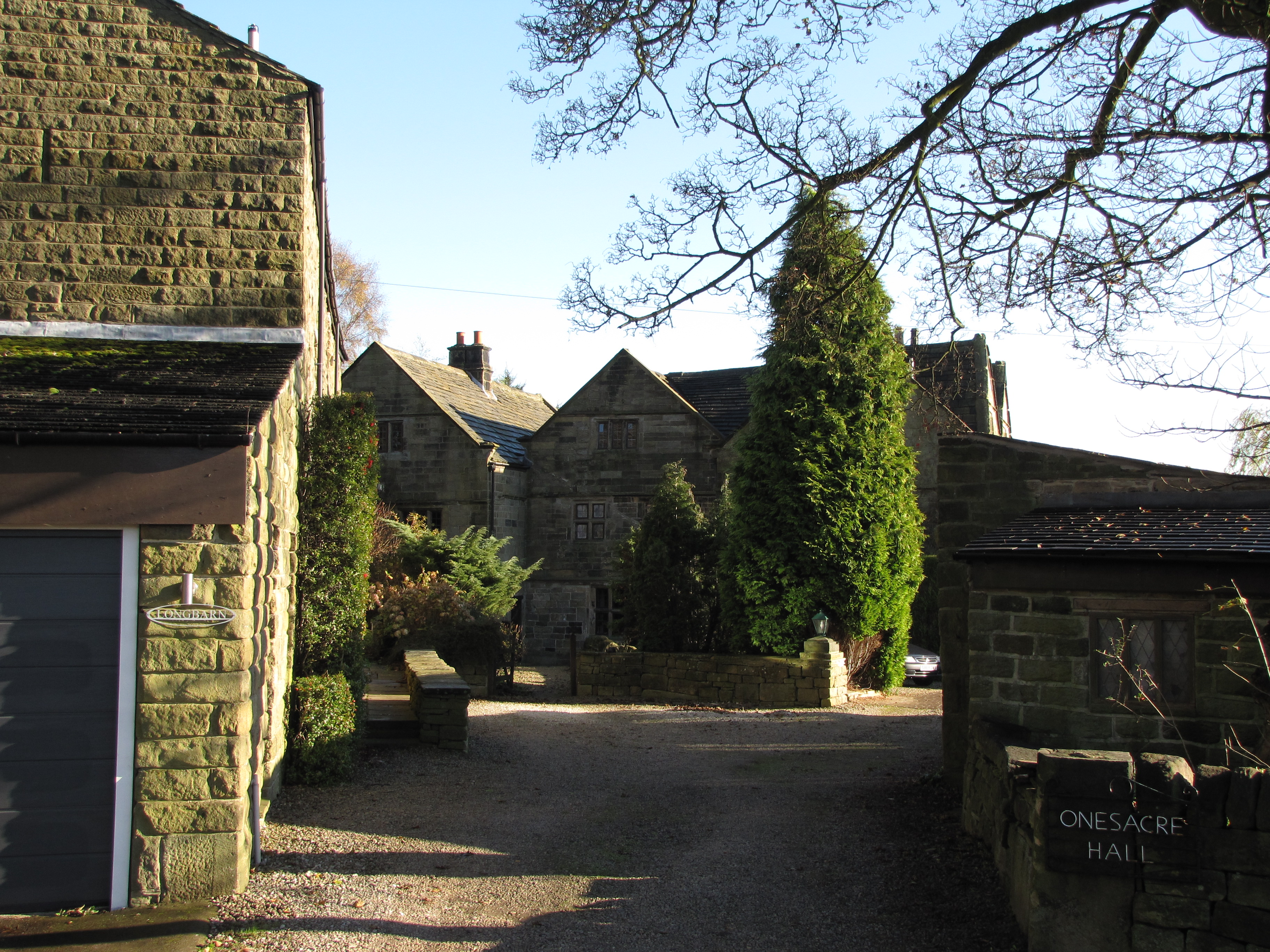
The halls western side seen from the main entrance.

Onesacre Hall is a Grade II* Listed building situated in the rural outskirts of the City of Sheffield in South Yorkshire, England. The hall is located on Green Lane in the small hamlet of Onesacre in the suburb of Oughtibridge, 5 miles (8.5 km) north west of the city centre.

== History ==
The present Onesacre Hall has no exact date of construction but is believed to have been built in the early and middle parts of the 17th century, however Onesacre itself is a hamlet of some antiquity, it was mentioned in the Domesday Book of 1086 and before that was part of the estate of the Saxon Lord, Godric. In the Domesday Book the hamlet is spelt Anesacre meaning "The Field of An" and comes from the Old Norse language. Onesacre was originally created as a forest clearing on high ground above the Don valley by Norwegian settlers. After the Norman Conquest the Onesacre lands were owned by the Le Rous family who were probably of Norman descent. Around 1380 the lands passed to the Stead family when Alice Le Rous, the sole heiress married John Stead of Wentworth.

The Steads were to become substantial landowners throughout South Yorkshire and owned the Onesacre estate for over 400 years until the year 1794, they were also connected to the nearby Hillsborough House and Burrowlee House. It was Nicholas Stead (1583-1639) and his son Thomas (1619–86) who instigated the building of the gabled and mullioned Onesacre Hall using the master mason John Hawley of nearby Thorn House Farm to construct the hall. The building was done in two phases the first being 1630 -1640 and the second between 1660 -1670. In 1672 the Steads were taxed on six hearths at the hall. After the Steads left Onesacre Hall in 1794 it became a farm with a writer commenting in 1862,

Here was a fine specimen of domestic architecture common a century or two ago - a many gabled mansion now used as a farmhouse.

The hall was divided into two farmhouses. One was Tophill Farm. The other was rented by Mr. Joe Wood who delivered milk to Oughtibridge and the surrounding district. The hall fell into disrepair during the second half of the 20th century and substantial renovation work has turned the hall into two private dwellings. Before the restoration a cock pit was found in the roof area of the hall.

== Architecture ==
The hall is constructed from ashlar sandstone with a stone slate roof, it is built in a rough "H" plan and has two storey with an attic. It has doubled chamfered mullion windows throughout some of which have had 20th century modification. The interior has chamfered beams in the left wing while the right wing has a large arched kitchen fireplace.
