= Hellaby Hall =

Country house in Hellaby, South Yorkshire, England

Coordinates: 53.4252°N 1.2402°W

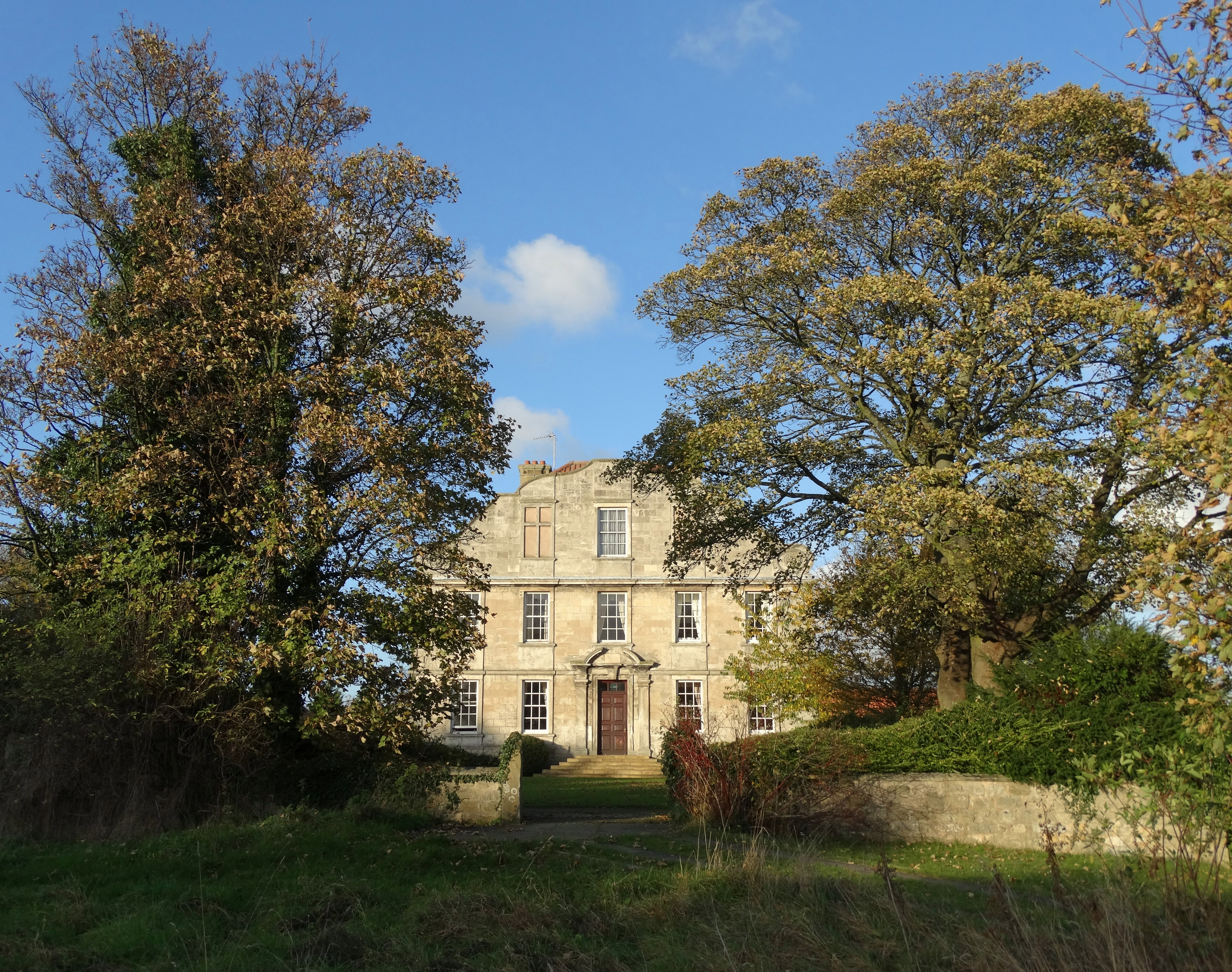
Hellaby Hall

Hellaby Hall, in Hellaby, South Yorkshire, England is a house of historical significance and is listed on the English Heritage Register as a Grade II* listed building. It was built in about 1688 by a wealthy English merchant and was the home to several notable residents over the next three centuries. Today it is a hotel and spa and caters for special events including weddings.

== Owners and residents ==
Ralph Fretwell (1631–1701) built the Hall between 1688 and 1692. He was from a notable family who had owned land in Hellaby since about 1500 in the time of Henry VIII. He was the eldest son of Ralph Fretwell and Margaret Spencer who was the daughter of William Spencer of Bramley Grange and Attercliffe. He married Mabel Saunderson and the couple had three daughters.

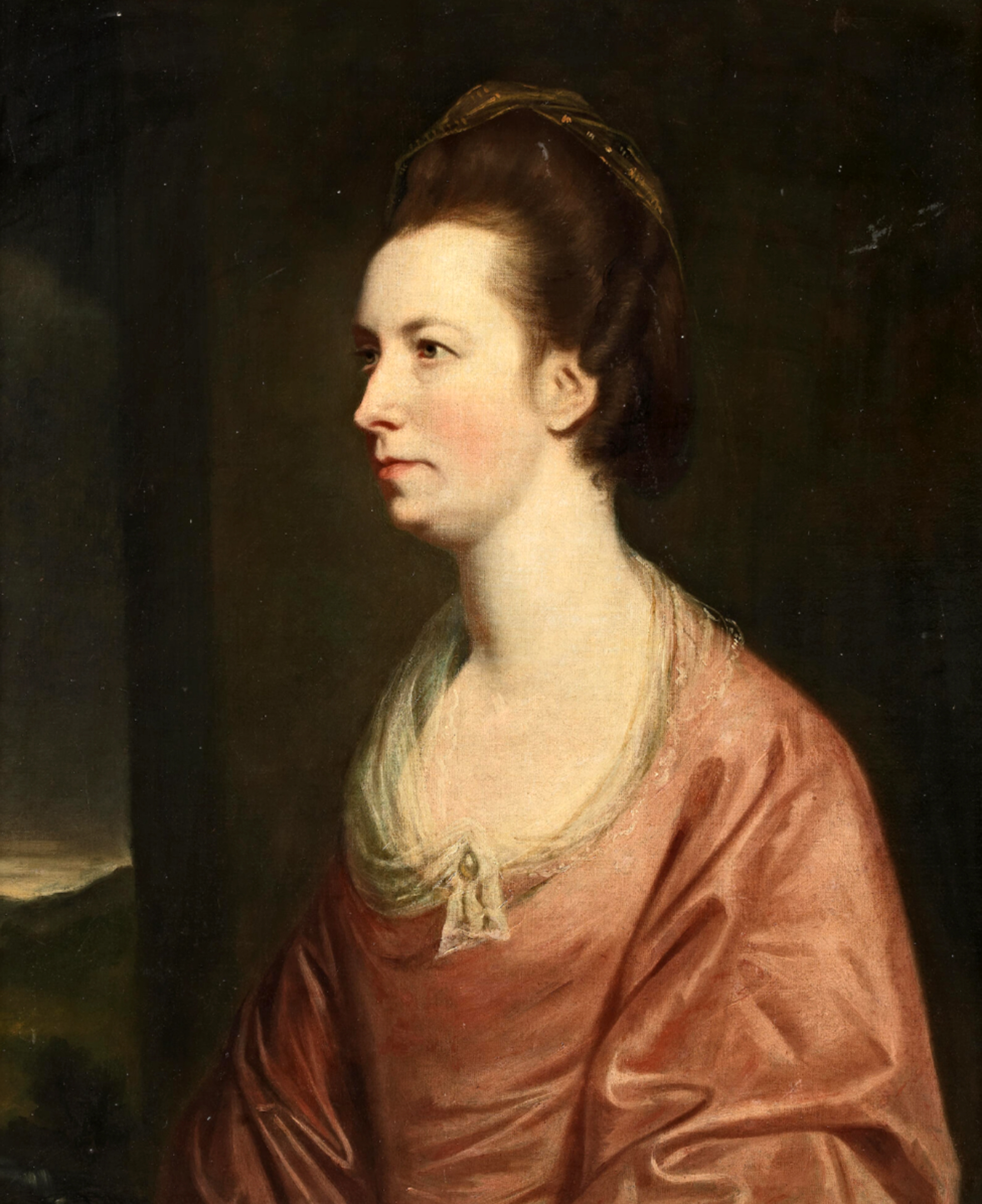
Lady Dorothea Eden circa 1750

In 1653 he went to Barbados and established successful sugar plantations. He held high offices in Barbados including that of a judge of the Court of Common Pleas. In 1671 He became a Quaker and is frequently mentioned in their publications. He amassed a considerable fortune and in the late 1680s he returned to England and built Hellaby Hall. He died in 1701 and left the Hall to his two surviving daughters Dorethea and Mabel. Mabel later relinquished her share to Dorethea.

Dorethea Fretwell (1687–1743) married John Pyott (1688–1729) of Streethay Hall in 1712 and the couple had two children. Their daughter Dorethea Pyott (1722–1810) married Peter Johnson (1725–1796), Recorder of York. They had one daughter Dorothea Johnson (1747–1792) who in 1767 married Sir John 4th Baronet Eden of West Auckland. As she was the only heir Helleby Hall was brought into the estate of the Eden family. She became Lady Dorothea Eden; her portrait was painted in around 1750.

From about the beginning of the 1800s the house was rented by the Clarke family for the next fifty years. Samuel Clarke (1766–1842) was a gentleman farmer He was an active member of the Methodist Church and is credited with bringing Methodism to Maltby. In 1806 he married Martha Johnson (1780–1809) and the couple had three children. Martha died in 1809. The eldest son John Clarke (1807–1887) who had married Ellen Cattle (1810–1880) in 1836 remained with his father at Hellaby Hall until Samuel died in 1842. He then continued farming at the property until about 1852.

In 1869 the Eden family sold the Hall to Edward Morrell (1806–1884) who owned a farm of about 500 acres in Bellasize. His son Thomas Edward Morrell (1851–1914) who assisted his father with their farming business appears to have lived at Hellaby Hall while Edward remained at the Bellasize farm. Thomas married Annie Child (1856–1921) in 1877 and the couple had seven children. Thomas operated the property as a horse stud and won numerous prizes at horse shows.

When Thomas died in 1914 his eldest son Edward Cecil Plumpton Morrel (1879–1922) inherited the Hall. He continued to run the estate as a horse stud. In 1922 he was killed in a shooting accident. He was not married and had no direct heirs so the property was sold. The new owner was Percy Carnelly.

Percy Carnelly (1890–1982) married Ethel Platts (1886–1973) in 1913 and the couple had one son, Clifford Carnelly (1922–1995). The 1949 Electoral register records Percy, Ethel, Clifford and his wife Dorothy all living at the Hall. The family remained there until about 1975 and it was then sold to a series of companies. It was finally converted into a hotel and it retains this function today.
