= Listed buildings in Wentworth, South Yorkshire =

Wentworth is a civil parish in the Metropolitan Borough of Rotherham, South Yorkshire, England. The parish contains 82 listed buildings that are recorded in the National Heritage List for England. Of these, three are listed at Grade I, the highest of the three grades, eight are at Grade II*, the middle grade, and the others are at Grade II, the lowest grade. The parish includes the village of Wentworth and the surrounding area. The most important building in the parish is Wentworth Woodhouse, a large country house, which is described as "one of England's greatest and most remarkable houses", and is "celebrated for being the longest front of any English country house". The house is listed together with associated structures and items in its grounds. Most of the other listed buildings are houses, cottages, and associated structures, farmhouses and farm buildings. The other listed buildings include churches and items in churchyards, a public house, a former school with attached almshouses, a folly, a mausoleum and a memorial tower, two windmills converted into houses, bridges, a weir and a causeway, a milestone and a milepost, workshops and a forge, a junior school, a former mechanics' institute, a war memorial, and a telephone kiosk.

== Key ==
Grade	Criteria
I	Buildings of exceptional interest, sometimes considered to be internationally important
II*	Particularly important buildings of more than special interest
II	Buildings of national importance and special interest

== Buildings ==
Name and location	Photograph	Date	Notes	Grade
Barn, Nether Haugh Farm; 53.46695°N 1.37024°W	—	15th century	The barn has a timber framed core, it has been encased in sandstone and brick, and has an asbestos sheet roof. There are two storeys and five bays. The barn contains doorways, casement windows, hatches, and slit vents, and there is some exposed timber framing.	II
West Hall and attached dwellings 53.48023°N 1.42398°W		15th century	The houses have been altered and extended, there is a timber framed core, the external walls are in sandstone with some brick, and the roofs are in Welsh slate and stone slate. They form an irregular plan with one or two storeys and attics. The main part of West Hall has quoins and coped gables. There are two storeys and an attic, and three bays. The doorway has a quoined surround and a fanlight, and the windows are sashes. Some internal timber framing remains in the houses.	II
Wentworth Old Church; 53.47991°N 1.42316°W		1490s	The oldest part of the church is the tower, and the rest was rebuilt in 1684. The nave was dismantled in the late 19th century, and is a ruin, and the chancel and chapel were restored in 1925. The church is built in sandstone, and the roof of the chancel and chapel are in stone slate. The tower at the west end has a small west window with a four-centred arched head, a quatrefoil, two-light bell openings, and a string course with corner gargoyles. The nave has retained a porch with a round arch, Ionic pilasters, a moulded impost band, an archivolt with a carved keystone, and a pediment with a re-set finial in the tympanum. In the chancel is a central doorway with a moulded surround and a cornice, and above it is a cartouche.	II*
60 and 62 Main Street; 53.48035°N 1.42231°W		16th century (probable)	A pair of houses with a timber framed core, encased in the 17th and 18h centuries, and later altered and extended. They are in sandstone, partly rendered, with quoins, and a stone slate roof. There are two storeys and a T-shaped plan, with a hall range of two bays, a two-bay cross wing, and to the left is a single-storey single-bay extension. The windows on the front are casements with lintels tooled as voussoirs, in the extension is a sash window, and in the rear is a three-light mullioned window. There are porches in the angles at the rear, and inside the houses is exposed timber framing.	II
Manor House and Harley Hall; 53.48196°N 1.44141°W	—	16th century	A group of houses with a timber framed core, later encased, altered and extended. They are in sandstone with roofs of stone slate, Welsh slate and tile. There are two storeys and an H-shaped plan, consisting of a six-bay hall range and cross-wings, with later additions to the cross-wings. Many of the windows and doorways have been altered.	II
Gateway, South Court, Wentworth Woodhouse; 53.47398°N 1.40526°W		c. 1620	The wall and screen were probably added to the gateway in the 18th century. The gateway is in limestone and has a square head, and fluted Doric pilasters with alternate blocks. On the top is an open pediment with scrollwork in the tympanum, a panel beneath, and surmounted by pedestals and scrolls. Flanking it are sandstone plinth walls ending in piers with cornices. On the walls is an elaborately decorated screen with panels in wrought iron.	II*
107–113 Main Street; 53.48016°N 1.42216°W	—	17th century	A group of houses and a shop, later altered and extended, they are roughcast with sandstone dressings and stone slate roofs. There are two storeys and six bays. In the left bay is an inserted shop window, and to its right is a doorway over which is an inscribed plaque. Over the fourth and fifth bays is a gable, and most of the windows are sashes.	II
Statue of Roman soldier (north); 53.47533°N 1.41270°W	—	17th century (probable)	The statue in the grounds of Wentworth Woodhouse is in limestone, and much weathered. It depicts an almost life-size Roman soldier.	II
Statue of Roman soldier (south); 53.47530°N 1.41284°W		17th century (probable)	The statue in the grounds of Wentworth Woodhouse is in limestone, and much weathered. It depicts an almost life-size Roman soldier leaning on a shield to his left, with a bearded face. The right arm and leg are missing.	II
The George and Dragon and Court Cottage; 53.47927°N 1.42084°W		Mid 17th century	A public house and a dwelling in sandstone, partly rendered, on a chamfered plinth, with quoins, and a stone slate roof with coped gables and shaped kneelers. There are two storeys and an attic. The east front has two gables and three bays. It contains a doorway with a moulded and quoined surround, a Tudor arched lintel, and a keystone. Most of the windows are mullioned with hood moulds, and some mullions missing. The south front has two bays, a central doorway with an arched lintel, sash windows, and over the doorway is an iron lantern with a decorative bracket.	II
Wentworth Woodhouse; 53.47425°N 1.40495°W		17th century	A large country house that was much extended and remodelled during the 18th century, the architects involved including John Carr and Henry Flitcroft. It is in sandstone and brick with roofs of copper and lead, and has two main fronts. The west front is in Baroque style, with two storeys in the middle part, single-storey wings and a half-basement. There are 17 bays, the central three bays with four giant Corinthian columns, and a parapet with urns and a statue. The east front is in Palladian style, and has two and three storeys and 49 balustraded bays. In the centre is a portico with six Corinthian columns and a pediment. There are flanking service wings with three storeys and eleven bays, linking to end pavilions with domed roofs.	I
Hoober Hall; 53.48973°N 1.37463°W		1691	A farmhouse in sandstone, with quoins, and a tile roof with chamfered gable copings and shaped kneelers. There are three storeys, three bays, and a rear outshut. The doorway has a chamfered quoined surround, a large lintel, and a hood mould continuing over the flanking windows. The windows are casements with mullions removed, some with hood moulds.	II
Pair of ornamental vases, Wentworth Woodhouse; 53.47491°N 1.40737°W	—	Late 17th or early 18th century	The vases flank the main drive to the west front of the house, and are in limestone on a square sandstone plinth. They are oval, and each vase has a turned foot, a base carved with foliage, a body entwined with fruiting vines in relief, and scrolled decorated handles.	II
Wentworth Hospital and railings 53.48115°N 1.42837°W		1725	A school with almshouses at the rear, the building is in red brick with a stone slate roofs that have coped gables and shaped kneelers, forming a quadrangle around a courtyard. The front range was the school and school house, it has two storeys, a floor band and an eaves band, and a symmetrical front of eleven bays. The central bay contains an archway, above it is a gable containing a clock, and on the roof is a timber bellcote. The almshouses have a single storey and in the centre of the rear range is a gable with an inscribed panel. The windows are a mix of sashes, casements, and later replacements. Along the front of the forecourt are iron railings on a coped stone plinth wall.	II
Glass House and Green House; 53.48118°N 1.40393°W	—	Early 18th century	A farmhouse, later divided, it is in red brick, with a gable end in sandstone, and a stone slate roof with a coped parapet and gables. There are two storeys, two bays on the front, a recessed two-bay extension on the left, and two rear wings. On the front is a trellised porch, the windows are tripartite sashes with mullions, and over the porch is a sundial with inscriptions, an iron gnomon with a scrolled support, and a cornice.	II
Needle's Eye; 53.48466°N 1.40439°W		Before 1728	A folly in the form of a square pyramid in sandstone about 45 feet (14 m) high. It is pierced by an ogee carriage arch, and has a plinth, an impost band, and moulded voussoirs. It is surmounted by an elaborate vase entwined with foliage on a square plinth.	II*
South Terrace wall, parapet and gateway, Wentworth Woodhouse; 53.47293°N 1.40860°W	—	c. 1735	The retaining wall to the South Terrace is in sandstone, with buttresses on the south-facing part, and a coped parapet. It extends from the south tower of the house to a bastion, where it turns to the west and contains two curved projections, then proceeds as a freestanding wall containing a carriage entrance with side gates. The bastion contains a wall sundial.	II
Ionic Temple; 53.47330°N 1.41203°W		1736	The ornamental temple in the grounds of Wentworth Woodhouse was designed by Henry Flitcroft, and is in Ionic style. It is in sandstone, and in the form of a peristyle rotunda. There is a plinth of three steps on which is a colonnade of ten columns with a full entablature. At the top are stepped courses and a saucer dome, and inside is a statue of Hercules fighting a beast.	II*
Doric Temple; 53.46982°N 1.39992°W		1744–45	The ornamental temple in the grounds of Wentworth Woodhouse was designed by Henry Flitcroft, and is in Doric style. It is in sandstone, and consists of an open-sided octagon with a vaulted dome. There is an arcade of attached columns with bands of stalactite rustication. Each round arch has a moulded plinth, an impost, and an archivolt with a console-shaped keystone. Over the columns, the cornice projects and carries ball finials.	II*
47 Clayfield Road; 53.47856°N 1.41109°W		c. 1745	A tower windmill that was converted into a dwelling in 1793, it is in red brick on a sandstone plinth. It consists of a truncated three-storey cone, with a porch on the front, and a concentric lean-to at the rear. The windows are casements with segmental brick arches, and at the top is a cogged band, a corbel table, and a stone-coped embattled parapet.	II
Hoober Stand; 53.48204°N 1.38754°W		1746–48	A memorial tower 26 metres (85 ft) high designed by Henry Flitcroft. It is in sandstone and has a triangular section, tapering from a perpendicular base to a parapet on corbels, and with rounded edges. At the base is a plinth, and a doorway with a keystone in a rounded arch with an impost band. Above this is an inscribed marble panel. On the tower are windows and, at the top, the parapet has an iron balustrade enclosing the remains of three sundials, and a domed cupola.	II*
117 and 119 Barrowfield Lane; 53.48178°N 1.42287°W	—	18th century	A pair of mirror-image houses in sandstone with quoins and a stone slate roof. There are two storeys and each house has three bays. The doorways are at the outer ends, and the windows are horizontally-sliding sashes.	II
Bear pit 53.47483°N 1.41312°W		18th century	A garden feature in the grounds of Wentworth Woodhouse, re-using a limestone doorway dating from about 1630. The feature is set in an overgrown earth mound, it has two storeys, and contains a curved tunnel leading to a circular vaulted chamber with a domed roof, and spiral steps leading to an upper landing. The lower entrance is the limestone doorway, which has extravagantly-carved piers, a frieze, a scrolled pediment, and a cartouche finial. The upper entrance is in sandstone, and has a shouldered lintel with an inscribed cast iron plaque.	II
Camellia House; 53.47447°N 1.41242°W		Mid 18th century	The camellia house is in the grounds of Wentworth Woodhouse, and most of it dates from the early 19th century. The earlier part is in limestone with a slate roof, the later part is in sandstone with brick returns, and the roof is glazed. There is a single storey and a front of nine bays, the middle three bays projecting and approached by steps. The building has a plinth, in the centre are four ionic columns and casement windows, and the outer bays are divided by Ionic pilasters, doubled at the ends, and contain sash windows. At the top is a plain frieze, a cornice, and a partial balustrade.	II*
Kennels House and attached buildings 53.47978°N 1.40927°W	—	Mid 18th century	Two houses linked by a range of buildings, they are in sandstone, and have stone slate roofs with coping gables and shaped kneelers. There are two storeys and an L-shaped plan, with Kennels House forming one range. This has three bays, a porch, two doorways with quoined surrounds, and casement windows. The other longer range includes a cartshed with six basket-arched openings, with five bays to its right, and the house to its left with two bays.	II
Morley Bridge; 53.46183°N 1.38400°W		18th century	The bridge crosses the stream between Dog Kennel Pond and Mill Dam in the grounds of Wentworth Woodhouse. It is in sandstone and consists of three segmental arches, the middle arch wider and taller. The bridge has tooled voussoirs, and parapets with domed copings. The southern wing walls curve and terminate in round-ended piers, and the northwest wing wall terminates at a square-ended pier.	II
Peacock Lodge Farmhouse; 53.46681°N 1.39824°W		Mid 18th century	The farmhouse is in rendered sandstone, with quoins, an eaves cornice and gutter brackets, and a stone slate roof with coped gables and shaped kneelers. There are two storeys and an attic, three bays, and a rear wing. In the centre is a porch and a doorway with an architrave, and the windows on the front are casements with small keystones. On the front is a sundial on stone brackets, with an iron gnomon and an inscription. The rear wing contains a three-light mullioned window and a fire insurance plaque.	II
Ha-ha, Wentworth Woodhouse; 53.47628°N 1.40579°W	—	18th century	The ha-ha links the Stable Block to the garden to the north of the house. It is a straight retaining wall about 2 metres (6 ft 7 in) high, in sandstone, with copings, and there is a ditch on the north side.	II
Sundial base (east), Wentworth Woodhouse; 53.47277°N 1.40574°W	—	Mid 18th century	The sundial base at the east end of the South Terrace is in sandstone. It has an octagonal plinth and base, and a turned baluster in the form of a tall-necked vase. The sundial is missing.	II
Sundial base (mid), Wentworth Woodhouse; 53.47295°N 1.40898°W	—	Mid 18th century	The sundial base at the midpoint of the South Terrace is in limestone or weathered marble. It has an octagonal plinth and base, and a trumpet-shaped pedestal encircled by foliate carving. The sundial is missing.	II
29 Main Street; 53.47877°N 1.41907°W	—	Mid to late 18th century	A sandstone house with quoins and a stone slate roof. There are two storeys and two bays. On the front is a porch and a doorway with a quoined surround, and the windows are casements.	II
Garden House north-east of Doric Temple; 53.47117°N 1.39972°W		Mid to late 18th century	The garden house is in sandstone with a stone slate roof. It has a single storey, and contains a round-arched niche with an impost band and a keystone. Inside is a semi-domed vault, and the niche contains a curved stone seat.	II
Manor Farmhouse; 53.48031°N 1.42162°W	—	Mid to late 18th century	The farmhouse is in sandstone, and has a roof of stone slate with coped gables and shaped kneelers. There are three storeys and three bays, a single-storey single-bay extension to the right, and a two-storey rear wing. In the centre is a porch, and the windows are casements, those in the ground floor with lintels tooled as voussoirs.	II
Giant urn, Wentworth Woodhouse; 53.47330°N 1.40630°W		Mid to late 18th century	An ornament in the grounds of the house, it is in sandstone. The urn is in the form of a large bowl with a diameter of about 2.5 metres (8 ft 2 in) with a moulded rim, on a large square pedestal, on a moulded plinth with a cornice.	II
Stable Block and Riding School, Wentworth Woodhouse; 53.47600°N 1.40842°W		1766–89	The former stable and riding school were designed by John Carr in Palladian style, and are in sandstone with Westmorland slate roofs. The stables form a quadrangular plan with ranges of 15 bays and a central courtyard. The main range has a plinth, rusticated quoins and two storeys, and contains two three-storey towers. In the centre is a portico with Tuscan columns and a round-arched entrance. On the roof is a drum with a clock, wall sundials, and a colonnaded cupola with a finial. The side ranges have a single storey with a square tower in the centre, and the rear range has two storeys in the centre and a single storey elsewhere. At the rear is the rectangular riding school with lunettes under the eaves.	I
Fountain and pool, Stable Block, Wentworth Woodhouse; 53.47625°N 1.40817°W		c. 1775	The lining of the circular pool in the centre of the stable block quadrangle is in sandstone on a stuccoed brick plinth, and in the middle of it is a stone fountain. Around the pool are four blocks forming steps. The fountain has a tapered pedestal, on which is a giant moulded bowl.	II
14 Cortworth Lane; 53.47626°N 1.38931°W	—	Late 18th century	The house is in sandstone with quoins and a facsimile stone slate roof. There are two storeys, three bays, and a rear wing. The doorway is in the centre, the windows are sashes with lintels tooled as voussoirs, and above the door is an inscribed plaque in an architrave.	II
Bridge and weir, Morley Pond; 53.46413°N 1.41048°W	—	Late 18th century	The bridge and weir are in sandstone, and the bridge consists of a single segmental arch. It has voussoirs, upward-projecting keystones, a parapet with chamfered copings, and flanking square piers. The three wing walls end in circular piers, and curved retaining walls ramp up to a small curved weir.	II
Causeway between Dog Kennel Pond and Morley Pond; 53.46342°N 1.39593°W		Late 18th century	The causeway between the ponds is in sandstone and is about 33 metres (108 ft) long. On the downwater side is an arcade of five blind arches interspersed by triangular cutwaters. On both sides are parapets with domed coping, sweeping to end in circular piers.	II
Hoober Stand Cottage; 53.48252°N 1.38688°W	—	Late 18th century (probable)	The cottage, in the form of a lodge, is in sandstone, with roofs of Welsh slate and stone slate. There is a single storey, the cottage is octagonal on a plinth, and it has an attached L-shaped wing with a hipped roof. The doorway has a fanlight and a cornice, and the windows are sashes.	II
Laburnum Cottage; 53.47862°N 1.41857°W	—	Late 18th century	The house is in sandstone with brick at the rear, and has quoins, and a stone slate roof with coped gables and shaped kneelers. There are two storeys and three bays. In the centre is a doorway with a fanlight, above it is a flat-arched recess, and the windows are casements.	II
Milestone, Cortworth Lane; 53.47087°N 1.37644°W		Late 18th century	The milestone is on the northeast side of Cortworth Lane. It is in sandstone, and consists of a slab with a shaped head. The inscription is weathered, and indicates the distances to London, Rotherham and Barnsley.	II
Range of buildings west of Stable Block; 53.47640°N 1.40900°W	—	Late 18th century	The buildings are in sandstone with roofs of Westmorland and Welsh slate. They have a T-shaped plan, consisting of a single-storey link block with north and south wings. The link block contains a central passageway with a flat arch, an inserted round arch, and sash windows. The south wing has 15 bays, and the north wing has nine. Both wings have plinths, two storeys in the central parts, eaves bands and hipped roofs, and contain sash windows.	II
The Cascade; 53.46312°N 1.40697°W	—	Late 18th century	The Cascade is a sandstone structure in Morley Pond. It consists of a curved retaining wall, lower in the centre, with abutment walls. The curved part is coped, and there are five slotted stone posts.	II
Urns flanking main steps, Wentworth Woodhouse; 53.47440°N 1.40522°W	—	Late 18th century	A line of garden ornaments, in the form of six urns, flanking the main steps on the west front of the house. They are in sandstone, the two inner urns are oval, and the outer urns are smaller and round. Each urn has a low plinth, a flared foot and a moulded bowl with egg-and-dart decoration on the rim.	II
Urns along west edge of path, Wentworth Woodhouse; 53.47439°N 1.40552°W	—	Late 18th century	A line of garden ornaments, in the form of six urns, along the edge of the path in front of the west front of the house. They are in sandstone, the two inner urns are oval, and the outer urns are smaller and round. Each urn has a low plinth, a flared foot and a moulded bowl with egg-and-dart decoration on the rim.	II
Rockingham Mausoleum, obelisks and enclosure 53.46841°N 1.37856°W		1785–91	The monument was designed by John Carr to commemorate Charles Watson-Wentworth, 2nd Marquess of Rockingham. It is in sandstone, and has three tiers. The bottom tier is square and rusticated, and contains a doorway and windows with attached Doric columns and pediments. The middle tier is open and has round arches with coupled Corinthian columns, and inside is a sarcophagus, and the top stage is circular, with Corinthian columns, four urns, and a dome. Inside there is a statue of Rockingham, and niches containing busts of eminent persons. The monument is surrounded by four obelisks, and an enclosure with iron railings.	I
Mausoleum Lodge; 53.47050°N 1.37629°W		c. 1790	The lodge at the entrance to The Rockingham Mausoleum is in sandstone on a stepped plinth, with a band, a cornice forming the gutter, and a hipped slate roof. There are two storeys and an octagonal plan, and a single-storey rear wing. Steps lead to double doors with a semicircular fanlight, an impost band, an archivolt, and a console-shaped keystone. In the flanking fronts are round-arched niches and recessed panels above. The windows are tall with round heads, archivolts, and keystones.	II
North Lodge, wall and gateway 53.47882°N 1.40818°W		1793	The lodge, wall and gateway at the northern entrance to the grounds of Wentworth Woodhouse were designed by John Carr, and are in sandstone with Welsh slate roofs. The lodge has a plinth, a dentilled cornice, a two-storey middle bay with a hipped roof, and flanking single-storey wings. In the centre is a round-arched recess with an archivolt, flanked by rusticated pilasters, containing an impost band, with a sash window below it, and a casement window above. The wings each has a coped parapet with ball finials, and an end pier, and contains a sash window. To the right a coped wall links to the gateway that has rusticated gate piers, each with a band, a frieze with paterae, a cornice, and a ball finial. The wall to the right ends in a pier with a ball finial.	II
The Round House; 53.48292°N 1.43138°W		1793	A tower windmill converted for residential use in 1835, it is in sandstone on a plinth, with a band and a cogged course under a parapet at the top. It consists of a truncated four-storey cone, with a concentric lean-to on the northwest side. There are two porches, one has a doorway with a pediment on consoles. The windows are a mix of sashes and casements.	II
The Mews; 53.47603°N 1.40924°W	—	Late 18th to early 19th century	A house, later offices, in sandstone on a plinth, with quoins, an eaves cornice, and a hipped Westmorland slate roof. There are two storeys and seven bays, the middle three bays projecting under a pediment. All the ground floor openings are round-headed; the doorway has a fanlight, and the windows are sashes. The upper floor windows are square, and are a mix of sashes and casements.	II
Perimeter wall, Wentworth Garden Centre; 53.47592°N 1.41323°W	—	Late 18th to early 19th century	Originally the wall enclosing the rectangular kitchen garden of Wentworth Woodhouse, it is in red brick with two external faces in sandstone. The wall is between 3 metres (9.8 ft) and 4 metres (13 ft) high, and is coped. The main entrance in the west wall has a Tuscan surround, in the east wall are iron gates and stone gate piers with cornices, and in the north wall is a simple doorway with a cornice, and an archway.	II
Burial enclosure, Wentworth Old Church; 53.48007°N 1.42296°W		1824	The enclosure contains a rectangular vault cover consisting of two stones on a large slab. It is surrounded by cast iron railings with fleur-de-lys finials, and along the upper rail is a running inscription. The vault is entered through a passage leading from the interior of the church.	II
31 Main Street; 53.47883°N 1.41902°W	—	Early 19th century	The house is in sandstone, roughcast on the right return, and in brick in the left return and rear. It has quoins, and a stone slate roof with square-cut gable copings and shaped kneelers. There are two storeys and two bays. The doorway has a quoined surround, above it is a casement window, and the other windows are sashes with tooled lintels.	II
18–22 Street Lane; 53.48273°N 1.39648°W		Early 19th century	A terrace of five sandstone cottages with a hipped stone slate roof. There are two storeys and nine bays. The windows are casements with lintels tooled as voussoirs, and between Nos. 21 and 22 is a through passage.	II
Ashcroft House; 53.47569°N 1.43023°W	—	Early 19th century	A sandstone house on a plinth with a stone slate roof that has coped gables and shaped kneelers. There are two storeys, a front range of three bays, a double rear wing, and a lower two-storey left wing. The central doorway contains a French window with a cornice, and the windows are sashes with lintels tooled as voussoirs. On the right is a 20th-century conservatory.	II
Doric Lodge, gates and railings 53.47332°N 1.41500°W		Early 19th century	The lodge at the entrance to the grounds of Wentworth Woodhouse is in sandstone with a Welsh slate roof, and is in the form of a tetrastyle Greek Doric temple. There are two storeys and a single-storey extension to the rear. On the front are two steps, four fluted columns, a triglyph frieze, a mutule cornice, and a pediment. The doorway has an architrave, clasping pilasters, a cornice on consoles, and above it is a recessed panel. The wing wall has a plinth, a semi-domed niche, and an end pier. In the upper floor are casement windows, and over them is a triglyph frieze. The railings and gates are in iron, and the railings end in a stone pier with a cornice.	II
Gates and railings opposite Doric Lodge; 53.47322°N 1.41534°W	—	Early 19th century	The gates and railings opposite the lodge are in iron, and form a gentle curve. The railings are set in a plinth wall of sandstone. In the centre are gates, and the railings end in monolithic piers with cornices.	II
Fountain and pool south of Camellia House; 53.47430°N 1.41254°W	—	Early 19th century	To the south of Camellia House in the grounds of Wentworth Woodhouse is an oval pool with a lining in sandstone, and with four tiered panels. In the centre of the pool is a small circular fountain with three, originally four, tiers.	II
Summerhouse, Cortworth Cottage; 53.47817°N 1.39396°W	—	Early 19th century	The summer house is in red brick, and has an upswept lead roof with a weathervane. There is a single storey, and a semi-octagonal plan with a projection from each corner. In the centre is a doorway with a pointed arch and Gothick glazing. The angled side walls have a casement window in a lancet opening, and in the wings are square casement windows.	II
Farm building, Home Farm; 53.47708°N 1.41209°W	—	Early 19th century	A combination farm building in sandstone, with an eaves band, and a hipped roof of Westmorland and Welsh slate with roof lights and ventilators. There is a single storey and an elongated range consisting of a blind arcade of 30 elliptical arches. Some bays have bollards at the base of the piers, and the openings include doorways with fanlights, and windows.	II
Pair of urns (north), Wentworth Woodhouse; 53.47460°N 1.40527°W	—	Early 19th century	The pair of urns on the west front of the house are in cast iron. The urns are in the form of vases on a square base, and each urn has a fluted foot, and a gadrooned bowl with handles springing from the head of a satyr.	II
Pair of urns (south), Wentworth Woodhouse; 53.47407°N 1.40558°W	—	Early 19th century	The pair of urns on the west front of the house are in cast iron. The urns are in the form of vases on a square base, and each urn has a fluted foot, and a gadrooned bowl with handles springing from the head of a satyr. The neck of the vase is decorated with rosettes and foliage, and the rim is flared and moulded.	II
Joinery workshop and Building Yard Cottage; 53.47919°N 1.40882°W		Early to mid 19th century	The workshop and house, later altered and used for other purposes, are in sandstone on a plinth, with paired gutter brackets and a hipped slate roof. There are two storeys and nine bays, the house occupying the left bay. In the centre is an archway, and the other openings include doorways with fanlights, and sash and casement windows, and in the left return is a circular window.	II
Barn, Home Farm; 53.47759°N 1.41080°W	—	Early to mid 19th century	The barn is in sandstone with paired gutter brackets and hipped slate roofs. There are mainly three storeys, seven bays, and lower two-bay wings. The windows are sashes, or slatted-wood ventilators, with lintels tooled as voussoirs. The other openings include segmental-arched cart entries with quoined surrounds, doorways, and circular pitching holes.	II
Workshop, Masons' Yard; 53.47888°N 1.41027°W		Early to mid 19th century	The workshop is in sandstone on a plinth, with an eaves band and hipped roofs in Westmorland slate. There is a symmetrical plan, with three bays, the central bay with two storeys, and the outer bays with one. In each bay is a segmental archway with a quoined surround, later infilled with a casement window or a garage door.	II
Wentworth Forge; 53.47890°N 1.40905°W		Early to mid 19th century	The forge is in sandstone and has a hipped Welsh slate roof. There is a single storey, a rectangular plan, and three bays. It contains various doorways, and windows with lintels tooled as voussoirs.	II
Gate piers northeast of the North Pavilion, Wentworth Woodhouse; 53.47543°N 1.40359°W	—	Early to mid 19th century	The gate piers are in sandstone. They consist of a square outer pier on a plinth with a cornice, and an attached inner pier with a bollard, a sunken panel and a moulded band under a scroll bracket.	II
Lamp standards and bollards, Wentworth Woodhouse; 53.47449°N 1.40420°W	—	Early to mid 19th century	A row of six cast iron lamp standards on sandstone pedestals, with intermediate sandstone bollards, along the east front of the house. The lamp standards have openwork pillars, and taper to a glazed lantern with a foliate base and rams' heads on the corners, and pyramidal caps with finials. Each pedestal has a moulded base and a cornice, and the bollards are hexagonal and tapering.	II
Wentworth School; 53.47942°N 1.42395°W		1836–37	The school is in sandstone on a plinth, with a Welsh slate roof. There is a single storey and an H-shaped plan, with a central block of five bays, and taller single-bay cross-wings. In the centre is a doorway over which is a gablet with a finial, and the doorway and windows in the central bock have quoined and chamfered surrounds. The cross-wings have gables with elaborately decorated bargeboards, and each contains a three-light window with a Tudor arch, mullions and transoms and a hood mould, and above it is a quatrefoil.	II
Former Mechanics Institute; 53.47816°N 1.41747°W		1844–45	The mechanics' institute, later used as a meeting hall, is in sandstone on a chamfered plinth, flanked by corner pilaster strips rising as embattled turrets, with chamfered bands, an embattled parapet rising in the centre over a blank shield, and a Welsh slate roof. There are two storeys, a symmetrical front of three bays, and a single-storey rear wing with an extension. Steps lead to a central double door with a double-chamfered surround and a Tudor arched lintel and hood mould. The windows are casements in chamfered surrounds, the window over the doorway with a hood mould.	II
Railings, gate piers and gate, Mechanics Institute; 53.47825°N 1.41742°W	—	Mid 19th century	The plinth wall along the front of the garden is in sandstone with chamfered coping. On the wall are iron railings with simple finials, and it extends for about 25 metres (82 ft). The central iron gate has square monolithic piers with moulded caps. At the right end is a pier with a chamfered plinth and a pyramidal cap.	II
Farm building with dovecote, Home Farm; 53.47721°N 1.41075°W	—	Mid 19th century	The farm building, including a dovecote, is in sandstone, the upper storey roughcast, with overhanging eaves and a Welsh slate roof. There are two storeys and six bays. In the ground floor are cast iron columns, the openings infilled with brick and stone, and the end piers projecting to support the eaves. In the upper floor are round-headed pigeon holes and a doorway. At the rear is a doorway and a ledge with pigeon holes above.	II
Milepost, Hoober Lane; 53.47896°N 1.37807°W	—	19th century	The milepost is on the north side of Hoober Lane, and consists of a sandstone pillar with cast iron overlay. On the upper panel is inscribed "BRAMPTON BIERLOW & HOOTON ROBERTS ROAD" and "BRAMPTON BIERLOW", and on the lower panels are the distances to Doncaster, Conisbrough, Hooton Roberts, Mexborough, Swinton, Barnsley, and Wentworth.	II
Octagon Lodge; 53.47784°N 1.40992°W		Mid 19th century	The lodge is in sandstone on a plinth, with an eaves cornice and a hipped Welsh slate roof. There is a single storey, a flattened octagon plan, and a rear wing on the right. The entrance front is gabled with an eaves band, and contains a gabled porch with round-arched entry and a doorway with a modillion cornice. The angled side walls contain sash windows.	II
Wall with railings encircling pool with statue 53.47545°N 1.40460°W	—	19th century	The circular wall is in the grounds of Wentworth Woodhouse, it is in sandstone and lined in brick, and has iron railings. The wall contains gates, and piers with cornices. Inside the enclosure are concentric paths, and in the centre is a pool containing the statue of a kneeling female.	II
Holy Trinity Church; 53.47864°N 1.42309°W		1872–77	The church, which was designed by J. L. Pearson in Gothic Revival style, is built in sandstone with tile roof. It has a cruciform plan, consisting of a nave with a clerestory, aisles, a north porch, transepts, a chancel with a north vestry, and a steeple at the crossing. The steeple has a tower with clock faces, coupled two-light bell openings, a string course with corner gargoyles, an embattled parapet, and a recessed broach spire with lucarnes and a weathervane. In the corner is a cylindrical stair turret with an arcaded panel and a conical cap. The east window has five lights under a rose window.	II*
Wall railings and gates, Holy Trinity Church; 53.47807°N 1.42417°W	—	c. 1877 (probable)	The churchyard is enclosed by a sandstone wall with chamfered copings and wrought iron railings. There are two double gates and a wider gate, all in wrought iron. The gate piers are in cast iron, they are octagonal and tapering, and have shaped tops.	II
Duck house, Home Farm; 53.47669°N 1.41127°W	—	Late 19th or early 20th century	The duck house is a circular single-storey building in sandstone on a plinth, with a conical stone slate roof and a finial. The plinth is pierced by small openings with iron doors, on the north side is a curved doorway, and there are three small windows under overhanging eaves.	II
Powerhouse, Home Farm; 53.47744°N 1.41024°W	—	c. 1910	The powerhouse, later used for other purposes, is in sandstone with slate roofs. It consists of a main single-storey rectangular block, with double wings and a chimney stack to the north, and a lower two-storey lean-to on the south. The main block has a coped gable with shaped kneelers, and a ridge lantern, and it contains a large entrance and sash windows. The chimney stack is square and tapering, and has an iron band and a table at the top, and iron steps with a balustrade on the right.	II
War memorial 53.47698°N 1.41451°W		1922	The war memorial is in an enclosure by a road junction, and is in Darley Dale stone. It consists of a Celtic wheel-cross on a tall tapering octagonal shaft. This stands on an octagonal double pedestal, on an octagonal base of four steps. The cross has a central boss and Celtic patterns in relief. On the pedestal are inscriptions and the names of those lost in the two World Wars. The enclosure has a coped stone wall at the rear, and a low kerb at the front, ending in square piers with rounded caps.	II
Telephone kiosk 53.47901°N 1.41932°W		1935	The K6 type telephone kiosk in Main Street was designed by Giles Gilbert Scott. Constructed in cast iron with a square plan and a dome, it has three unperforated crowns in the top panels.	II
