= Hoober Observatory =

J A Jones Hoober Observatory
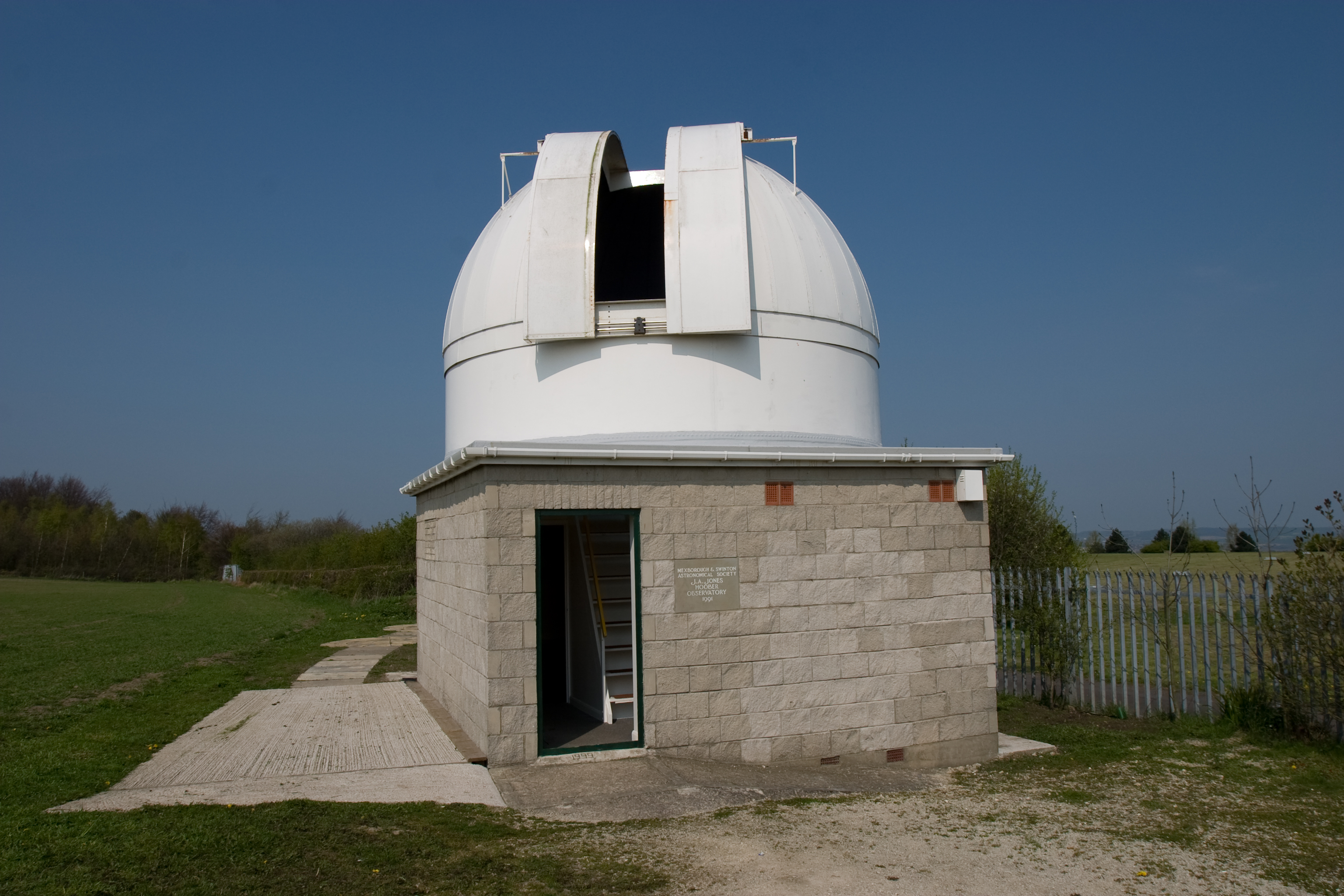
- Organization: Mexborough & Swinton Astronomical Society
- Location: Rotherham, South Yorkshire
- Coordinates: 53°28′53″N 1°22′54″W
- Altitude: 147.25 metres (483.1 ft)
- Established: 1993
- Website: Hoober at MSAS

Telescopes
- Rich Field Telescope: 130 mm (5-inch) refractor
- Deep Field Telescope: 360 mm (14-inch) Schmidt-Cassegrain
- Related media on Commons

J A Jones Hoober Observatory is a privately owned observatory located in South Yorkshire, England near to the villages of Hoober and Wentworth, 4 miles (6.4 km) North-northwest of Rotherham. It can be found about 300 metres (0.19 mi) east of Hoober Stand. The observatory is owned and operated by Mexborough & Swinton Astronomical Society (NPO).

== Architecture and design ==
The observatory consists of a 5 metres (16 ft) square building topped by a 5-metre diameter dome. The observatory was built by the members between 1991 and 1993. Originally the dome was only 4 metres (13 ft) in diameter. In 1999 a major refurbishment of the observatory was completed including a new 5-metre diameter dome, which was designed & built by the members over the preceding 3–4 years.

The observatory was extended in 2018 by adding a 5-metre square extension (public room). The building also underwent extensive refurbishment inside and outside to create a toilet and improve facilities for disabled visitors.

== Telescopes ==
The observatory originally contained the Rayna Telescope, an 18 inches (460 mm) newtonian reflector on a fork mount, this was dedicated to long standing member Ray Jackson and his wife Ina. The telescope was built by Peter Drew of the Amateur Astronomy Centre, Todmorden. It was based around an 18-inch f/4.5 parabolic mirror ground by John Owen. Whilst in use the Rayna telescope was the largest telescope open to the public in South Yorkshire.

The observatory currently contains a Takahashi TOA-130F 130 millimetres (5.1 in) f/7.6 apochromatic refractor and a Celestron C14-AF XLT 14 inches (360 mm) f/11 Schmidt-Cassegrain telescope on a Software Bisque Paramount mount, with GoTo. These were purchased to replace the Rayna telescope.

Other telescopes include a 60 millimetres (2.4 in) Coronado SolarMax H-alpha telescope on a Vixen GPDX German Equatorial mount with a SkySensor 2000 goto system for Solar Observing. There are also a number of smaller telescopes which can be loaned to members.

== Skylark ==
The Society possess the nose cone and instrument bay, currently on display in the observatory, of a Skylark sounding rocket that was launched from RAAF Woomera Range Complex in March 1970 reaching a height of 135 miles.

== Public access ==
The society opens the observatory to the public for evening viewing sessions during the winter months, for Solar observing on Sunday afternoons during the summer and for astronomical events e.g. meteor showers or lunar eclipses.

The observatory, located off Lea Brook Lane in Rotherham, South Yorkshire, is thirty minutes' drive from central Rotherham, is one hours' drive from central Barnsley and one hours' drive from central Doncaster.

== Hoober Observatory and light pollution ==
Whilst the observatory is located in an area of countryside with relatively dark skies compared to Mexborough and Swinton, naked eye limiting magnitudes are rarely below magnitude 4.

== Mexborough & Swinton Astronomical Society ==
Mexborough & Swinton Astronomical Society
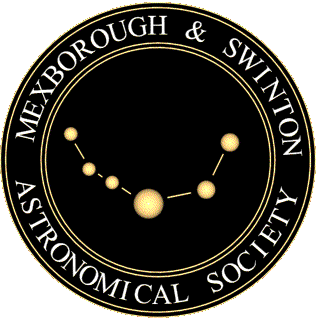
- Founded: 1978
- Type: Local Organisation
- Location: South Yorkshire, England
- Website: http://msas.org.uk/

The Hoober Observatory is owned and operated by Mexborough & Swinton Astronomical Society, a society and charity based in Swinton, South Yorkshire. Founded on 21 May 1978 as "The Night Sky Astronomy Club" it amalgamated with "The Mexborough Astronomy Club" in late 1978 and became the "Mexborough & Swinton Astronomical Society". It applied for and successfully achieved Charitable Status in 1997.

The society meet at Mexborough Church Hall, Church Street, Mexborough, S64 0ER

Guest lecturers visit the society approximately weekly. Quarterly the society's Observations Officer gives the members an overview of celestial phenomena expected over the next three months and usually issues an observing challenge for the next quarter. Other meetings will find members giving presentations on astronomical subjects of their choice, astronomical quizzes and debates.

The society currently has around 50 members, from throughout South Yorkshire, representing all parts of the community.

== See also ==
- List of astronomical societies
