= Scholes, South Yorkshire =

Village in South Yorkshire, England

Coordinates: 53.454782°N 1.40663°W

Scholes
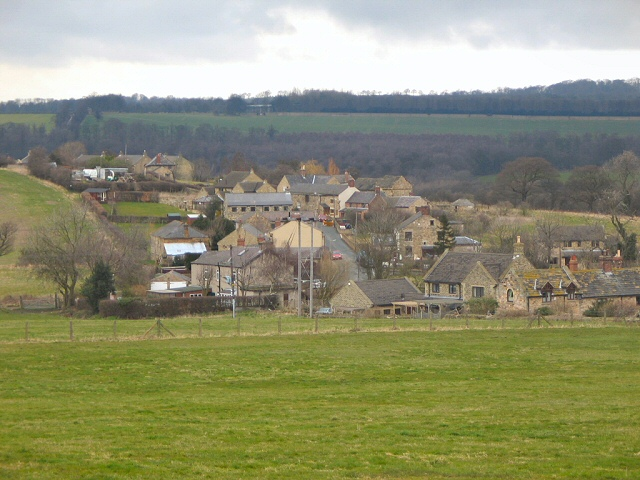
- A view from south of the village

- Location within South Yorkshire
- OS grid reference: SK395955
- Metropolitan borough: Rotherham
- Metropolitan county: South Yorkshire
- Region: Yorkshire and the Humber
- Country: England
- Sovereign state: United Kingdom
- Post town: ROTHERHAM
- Postcode district: S61
- Dialling code: 01709
- Police: South Yorkshire
- Fire: South Yorkshire
- Ambulance: Yorkshire

Scholes is a small village in the Rotherham borough of South Yorkshire, England, near the southern boundary of Wentworth Woodhouse, formerly the family seat of the Earls Fitzwilliam. The village is the location of Keppel's Column.

Scholes Coppice contains several archaeological features, including Caesar's Camp, an Iron Age fort, regarded as one of the best examples of its kind in South Yorkshire.
