= Listed buildings in Hooton Roberts =

Hooton Roberts is a civil parish in the Metropolitan Borough of Rotherham, South Yorkshire, England. The parish contains nine listed buildings that are recorded in the National Heritage List for England. Of these, one is listed at Grade II*, the middle of the three grades, and the others are at Grade II, the lowest grade. The parish contains the village of Hooton Roberts and the surrounding countryside. The listed buildings consist of a church, farmhouses and farm buildings, a public house and an associated former coach house, a rectory, and a milepost.

== Key ==
| Grade | Criteria |
|---|---|
| II* | Particularly important buildings of more than special interest |
| II | Buildings of national importance and special interest |

== Buildings ==
| Name and location | Photograph | Date | Notes | Grade |
|---|---|---|---|---|
| St John's Church; 53.46816°N 1.27231°W | | 12th century | The church was extended and altered through the centuries, particularly following a fire in 1700, and it was restored in 1875–76. It is built in sandstone with slate roofs, and consists of a nave, a partial south aisle with a lean-to porch in the angle, a chancel with a south chapel, and a west tower. The tower is in Perpendicular style and has two stages, a three-light west window with a depressed Tudor arched head, a southeast stair tower, a clock face, two-light bell openings, an embattled parapet with crocketed pinnacles, and a weathervane. The chancel and chapel also have embattled parapets. | II* |
| The Earl of Strafford; 53.46793°N 1.27293°W | | Late 16th or early 17th century | At one time a dower house, later converted into a public house, it is in sandstone with quoins and hipped roofs of stone slate and tile. There are two storeys, a main block with a double-depth plan and three bays, and flanking single-bay wings. In the left bay of the main block is a porch with a bracketed cornice and a peaked blocking course. Most of the windows are sashes, and in the right wing are tripartite windows. At the rear is a blocked Tudor arched doorway, and windows with moulded mullions. | II |
| Garden wall and archway, Firsby Hall Farm; 53.45860°N 1.25732°W | — | c. 1700 | The garden wall and doorway are in sandstone. The doorway has a round arch with moulded voussoirs, above which is a string course and a shaped gable with finials, including a carved head. The wall on the left of the archway has triangular copings and runs for about 20 metres (66 ft), and to the right it has flat copings and runs for about 5 metres (16 ft). | II |
| Barn, Firsby Hall Farm; 53.45884°N 1.25746°W | | Early to mid 18th century | The barn is in sandstone with quoins, stone slate eaves courses, and a pantile roof with chamfered gable copings and shaped kneelers. There are two storeys, and six bays. It contains wagon entrances, blocked slit vents, and hatches. | II |
| Rectory; 53.46848°N 1.27281°W | — | Early to mid 18th century | The rectory incorporates earlier material, and was extended in the 19th century. It is in sandstone, with quoins, and a pantile roof with coped gables. The original part has two storeys and an attic, three bays, and a rear stair wing. To the left is a later two-storey cross-wing, and to the right is an added bay. The porch has a tiled roof, and the doorway has an architrave, voussoirs, and a keystone. The windows are sashes, some with keystones. In the cross wing are mullioned windows with lintels cut to resemble voussoirs and keystones, and in the rear wing is a Venetian window. | II |
| Hooton Common Farmhouse; 53.46752°N 1.28835°W | | Mid 18th century | The farmhouse is in sandstone, with quoins, and a roof of Welsh slate with some stone slate, and chamfered gable copings with shaped kneelers. There are two storeys and an attic, a front range of five bays, and a rear wing on the right. The central doorway has an architrave, and is flanked by canted bay windows. In the upper floor are sash windows, and the right return contains two-light mullioned windows. | II |
| Barn southeast of St John's Church; 53.46770°N 1.27196°W | | Late 18th century | The barn, which has been converted for residential use, is in sandstone with quoins and a pantile roof. There are three storeys and ten bays. On the north side is a segmental-arched doorway, extending from the south side is an apsidal horse engine house, and in both fronts are segmental-arched windows. | II |
| Coach house south of The Earl of Strafford; 53.46760°N 1.27314°W | — | Early 19th century | The coach house and stable block have been converted for residential use. The building is in sandstone on a plinth, with quoins, a sill band, an eaves band, paired gutter brackets, and hipped stone slate roofs. The stable block has two storeys and three bays, a single-storey rear wing, and a single-storey two-bay coach house to the left. In the centre of the stable block is a wide doorway, the windows are casements, and at the ends of the upper floor are oculi. The coach house contains two segmental-arched carriage entrances with quoined surrounds. | II |
| Milepost; 53.46819°N 1.28890°W | | 19th century | The milepost is on the northeast side of Hooton Road (B6090 road). It consists of a sandstone pillar with cast iron overlay, and has a triangular section and a rounded top. On the top is inscribed "BRAMPTON BIERLOW & HOOTON ROBERTS ROAD"" and "HOOTON ROBERTS"", and on the sides are the distances to Doncaster, Conisbrough, Hooton Roberts, Barnsley, and Wentworth. | II |
