= Astronomy Centre =

Astronomical observatory in northern England

- Location: Todmorden, Calderdale, West Yorkshire, Yorkshire and the Humber, England
- Coordinates: 53°42′41″N 2°09′16″W
- Established: 1982
- Website: www.astronomycentre.org.uk
- Location of Astronomy Centre

The Astronomy Centre, also known as the Amateur Astronomy Centre, is an astronomical observatory located in northern England which is run by experienced amateur astronomers and is open to the public at certain times.

== History and purpose ==
Founded in November 1982 by Peter Drew, Linda Simonian and Rob Miller on the site of a disused factory, high in the Pennines, the Centre provides opportunities for its members, schools, local community groups and the general public to observe and photograph astronomical phenomena at a range of wavelengths during daylight and night hours.

At the time the Centre was conceived, access to equipment and expertise was unavailable for many amateur astronomers in the UK and a national centre would have provided an invaluable focal point. Developments in optical fabrication, photography and communications now permit many visitors and members to complement their home astronomical facilities, skills and experience with those of the Astronomy Centre.

In keeping with the Centres original ethos, besides welcoming visitors to the facility, current members engage off-site with schools, youth organisations and community groups and also provide contributions to national, regional, local print and broadcast media.

== Structures ==
The first permanent housing on the site was built to shelter a 17 inches (430 mm) aperture Newtonian telescope. Further construction took the total number of separate telescope mountings to 14 by the end of 2015.

The main observatory tower is a three level 29 feet (8.8 m) round building topped by an aluminium dome with twin 3 feet (0.91 m) sliding doors. Its construction by the members was completed in April 2000.

== Telescopes and other instruments ==
The largest optical telescope currently in regular use is a 30 inches (760 mm) open truss Newtonian on a mount inspired by the designs of John Dobson. A 42.6 inches (1,080 mm) mirror blank is available for a future enhancement of the facilities but construction of the UK's largest reflector since the destruction of the 98 inches (2,500 mm) original Isaac Newton Telescope at Herstmonceux Castle is currently on hold.

In addition to the permanently mounted 30", 20", 17", 16", 12" and 8" instruments there are fixed locations to allow a number of smaller portable items to be quickly set up if visitor numbers increase on a clear night.

Many of the optical instruments were constructed by telescope maker Peter Drew, who has also provided many other societies and individuals (such as Hoober Observatory) with their equipment. This includes a number of cameras obscura similar to, but smaller than, the one installed on the main Observatory building.

== Public and community access ==
Observational astronomy takes place on weekly open nights, for special events and by special arrangement with keyholders. As well as the basics of visual astronomy visitors can undertake a wide range of more advanced observations guided by volunteers with long experience in safe solar astronomy, infra-red astronomy and radio astronomy.
