= The Rockingham Mausoleum =

Historic site in South Yorkshire, England

Coordinates: 53.4684°N 1.3785°W

Rockingham Mausoleum
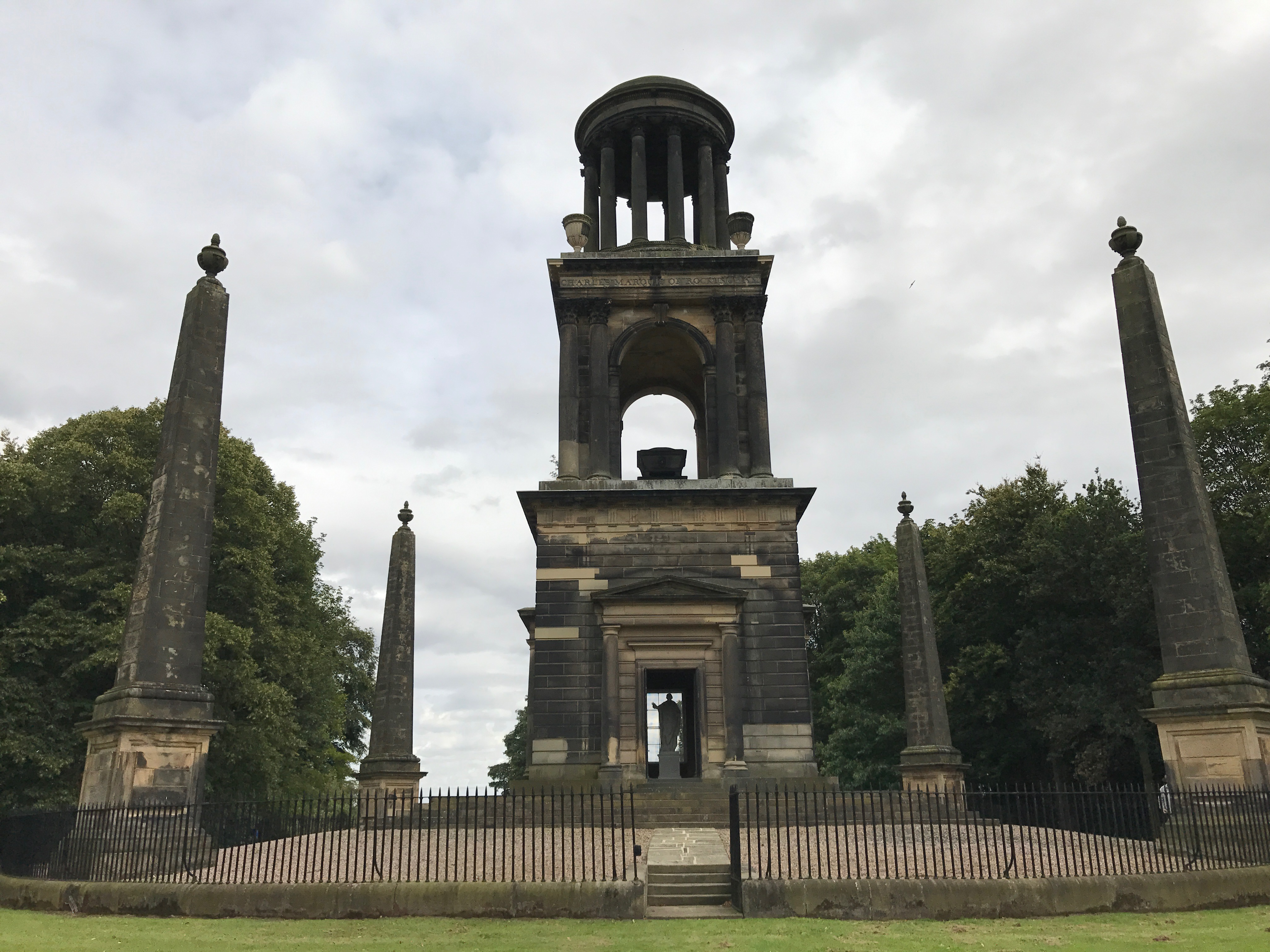
- "an outstandingly fine and noble structure"

- Location within South Yorkshire
- Type: Cenotaph
- Location: Wentworth
- OS grid reference: SK413970

History
- Built: 1783–89

Site notes
- Height: 90 feet (27 m)
- Area: South Yorkshire
- Architect: John Carr
- Architectural style: Neo-classical
- Governing body: Fitzwilliam Wentworth Amenity Trust

Listed Building – Grade I
- Official name: Rockingham Mausoleum Including Obelisks and Railed Enclosure
- Designated: 29 April 1968
- Reference no.: 1286386

The Rockingham Mausoleum, Wentworth, near Rotherham, South Yorkshire, England is a cenotaph commemorating Charles Watson-Wentworth, 2nd Marquess of Rockingham, who was Prime Minister at the time of his death in 1782. The name by which the memorial is now known is in fact a misnomer, since Charles Watson-Wentworth is buried in York Minster. Eighteenth and nineteenth century sources refer to the edifice simply as "the Monument".

== History ==
The Rockingham Mausoleum was commissioned in 1783 by William Fitzwilliam, 4th Earl Fitzwilliam when he inherited the estates of his uncle Charles Watson-Wentworth, 2nd Marquess of Rockingham who died without a direct male heir.

The architect chosen for the Rockingham Mausoleum was John Carr of York, who had already built the stable block at Wentworth Woodhouse for Lord Rockingham himself. Carr was to do a great deal of work for Lord Fitzwilliam, notably alterations to the side pavilions and to the west elevation of Wentworth Woodhouse. He submitted a number of options for the monument, some of which were based on the concept of an obelisk. The three-storey design ultimately selected for the Rockingham Mausoleum may have been inspired by the Mausoleum of the Julii at St Remy de Provence, Glanum near Arles, France. As executed, it is a combination of a cenotaph and a Temple of Friendship, housing within it a statue by Joseph Nollekens of Rockingham himself in Garter robes with upraised hand.

Building started in 1785 and took four years to complete. accounts record regular small payments to local artisans and more infrequent but larger disbursements to better-known craftsmen such as Nollekens. The building was enclosed by a fence of 743 iron railings commissioned from the Rotherham iron-founders Samuel Walker and Company. Finally, in 1792 four obelisks, which had previously stood on the West side of the Woodhouse, were relocated to the Monument and placed inside the enclosure.

The monument is the property of the Fitzwilliam Wentworth Amenity Trust, which completed its restoration in the 1980s with the aid of compensation from British Coal and a grant from English Heritage. It only became possible to undertake this work when local coal mining operations had come to an end, making it safe to remove iron clamps which had kept the building stable while mining was in progress. The monument was opened to the public for the first time in 1991.

The Fitzwilliam Wentworth Amenity Trust is a charitable trust formed in 1979 with an endowment from Thomas Wentworth-Fitzwilliam, 10th Earl Fitzwilliam. The principal aim of the Trust is to promote the permanent conservation of lands and building of beauty or historic interest and generally to protect, preserve and improve the rural and visual character and amenities of the Parish of Wentworth and the adjacent areas. The Trust continues to invest in the conservation and restoration of the landscape and buildings in and around Wentworth.

== Architecture and description ==
The mausoleum is built of ashlar sandstone. It is a 90 feet (27 m) high three-stage monument, with obelisks at the four corners. Niches in the walls support busts of eight of the Marquis's closest friends, all luminaries of the Whig hierarchy; Admiral Viscount Keppel, Edmund Burke, Sir George Savile, Charles James Fox, The Duke of Portland, John Lee, Lord John Cavendish and Frederick Montagu. The original busts by Nollekens, Carrachi, John Bacon and William Hickey have now been replaced by casts. The large sarcophagus which can be seen from the exterior reposing on the first storey is vacant. Pevsner described it as "an outstandingly fine and noble structure". It is a Grade I listed building.

== See also ==
- Grade I listed buildings in South Yorkshire
- Listed buildings in Wentworth, South Yorkshire

== Sources ==
- Radcliffe, Enid; Pevsner, Nikolaus (1967). Yorkshire: The West Riding. The Buildings Of England. Penguin Books.
- Baines, Edward, ed. (1822). History, Directory & Gazeteer, of the County of York, Vol.1 - West Riding – via archive.org.
