= Hooton Roberts =

Village and civil parish in South Yorkshire, England

Coordinates: 53.468°N 1.272°W

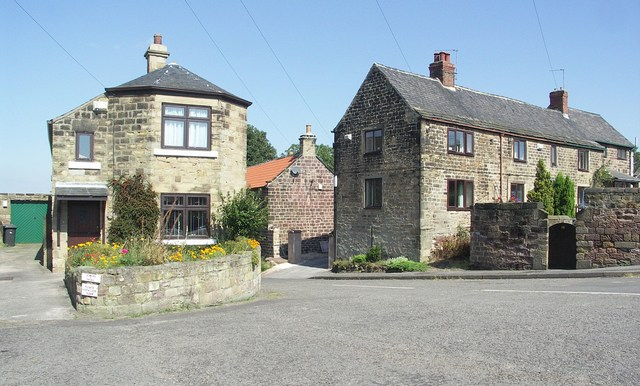
Houses in Hooton Roberts

Hooton Roberts is a village and civil parish situated in the Metropolitan Borough of Rotherham in South Yorkshire, England. Among several listed buildings in the village are the local church, dedicated to St John the Baptist, the rectory on Doncaster Road, and the Earl of Strafford public house (a former manor house).

== History ==
The name Hooton derives from the Old English hōhtūn meaning 'settlement on a hill spur'. The origin of the Roberts suffix is uncertain but likely refers to either Robert, the son of William, the Lord of the manor in 1226, or Robertus filius Willelmi de Hoton, the Lord of the manor in 1285.

The village was home to the Gatty family of Ecclesfield. Nicholas Comyn Gatty, son of the Rev. Reginald Gatty, was born in Bradfield, Sheffield, on 13 September 1874. He was educated at Downing College, Cambridge and at the Royal College of Music which is where he met and became a lifelong friend of Ralph Vaughan Williams, who from the 1900s spent many a summer vacation with the Gattys at Hooton Roberts. In September 1902, Williams composed the song Linden Lea sitting in the rectory gardens, where the walls were covered with ivy, and on the lawn were croquet hoops. Williams often played croquet at Hooton Roberts.

In 1897, the Hooton Roberts Musical Society was formed by the Gattys. Nicholas played the harpsichord and the violin. His brothers Ivor and René were also involved with the society. His first opera, Greysteel, with text by René, was performed in Sheffield on 1 March 1906 by the Moody-Manners touring company, and at the Crystal Palace on 24 May, Lucy Broadwood, acting as guarantor. This was followed by the opera Duke or Devil, premiered in Manchester on 16 December 1909, again by the Moody-Manners company. This opera proved more successful, as did his next opera Prince Ferelon, which won a Carnegie Award. Gatty's other operatic works were: The Tempest, King Alfred and the Cakes, both with text by René Gatty. His orchestral works included a Concert Allegro for piano and orchestra premiered at the Proms in 1901 and a set of Variations on Old King Cole.

In October 1972, a Vaughan Williams Festival was held at Hooton Roberts to mark the centenary of the composer's birth. Gatty's Mass for four voices was performed here.

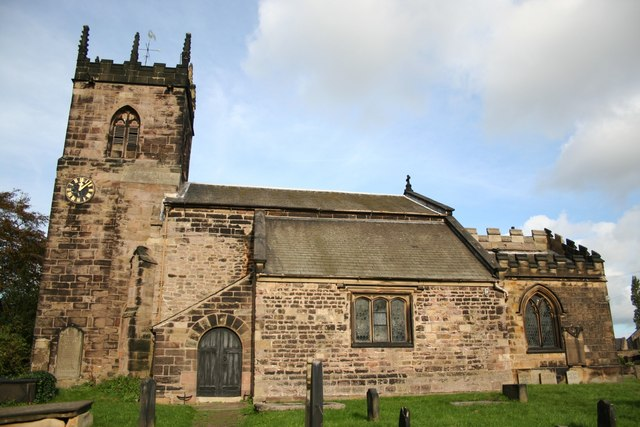
Church of St John the Baptist

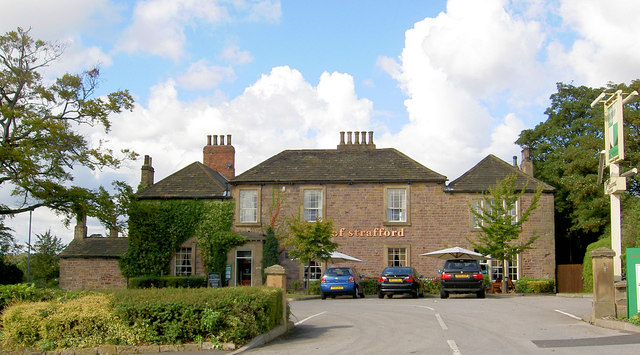
The Earl of Strafford public house

The first Earl of Strafford's widow lived at the manor house and, when she died in 1688 at the age of 83, she was buried secretly by torch light in the chancel of the church. There is a memorial to her husband at Wentworth Woodhouse, where he was thought to have been buried. However, in 1895, when work was being carried out near the altar in St John's, three unknown skeletons were found, one appearing to be headless. They were thought to be the Earl, his wife and 16-year-old daughter, who had rickets, as one of the skeletons had signs of this disease.

Strafford, (1593–1641) from a great Yorkshire family, was chief adviser of Charles I. He was impeached by the Long Parliament and, with the King's reluctant assent, was executed in May 1641 – 'Put not your trust in princes' he exclaimed when he heard of the King's defection.

Hooton Roberts had a population of 181 in 2001. This had increased to 210 at the 2011 Census.

== See also ==
- Listed buildings in Hooton Roberts
