= Holy Trinity Church, Wentworth =

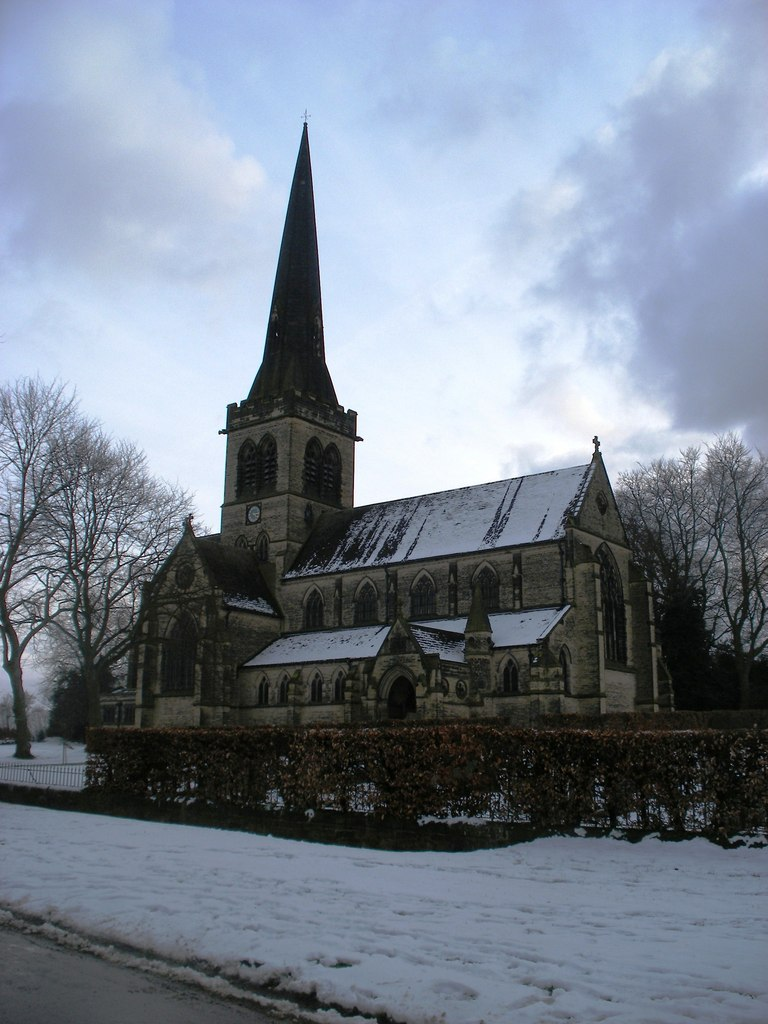
- Holy Trinity Church, Wentworth
- Holy Trinity Church, Wentworth
- 53°28′42.6″N 1°25′21.26″W
- OS grid reference: SK 38387 98141
- Location: Wentworth, South Yorkshire
- Country: England
- Denomination: Church of England
- Churchmanship: Anglican Church
- Website: https://wentworthchurch.com

History
- Dedication: Holy Trinity
- Consecrated: 31 July 1877

Architecture
- Heritage designation: Grade II* listed
- Architect: John Loughborough Pearson
- Style: Gothic revival
- Groundbreaking: 1873
- Completed: 1877

Specifications
- Capacity: 650 people

Administration
- Diocese: Diocese of Sheffield
- Archdeaconry: Doncaster
- Deanery: Wath
- Parish: Wentworth

Holy Trinity Church is a Grade II* listed parish church in the Church of England in Wentworth, South Yorkshire.

== History ==
The church was built by William Wentworth-Fitzwilliam, 6th Earl Fitzwilliam in memory of his parents. Construction started in 1872 and the building was designed by John Loughborough Pearson. It was completed in 1876 and consecrated on 31 July 1877 by the Archbishop of York. On opening, Old Holy Trinity Church, Wentworth was closed.

== Stained glass ==
- East window 1888 by Clayton and Bell
- West window by James Powell & Sons, Whitefriars

== Organ ==
The church contains a pipe organ by Henry Willis dating from 1877. It was restored in 1981 by Chalmers and Hyde. A specification of the organ can be found on the National Pipe Organ Register.

== See also ==
- Grade II* listed buildings in South Yorkshire
- Listed buildings in Wentworth, South Yorkshire
