= Old Holy Trinity Church, Wentworth =

Coordinates: 53.4799°N 1.4233°W

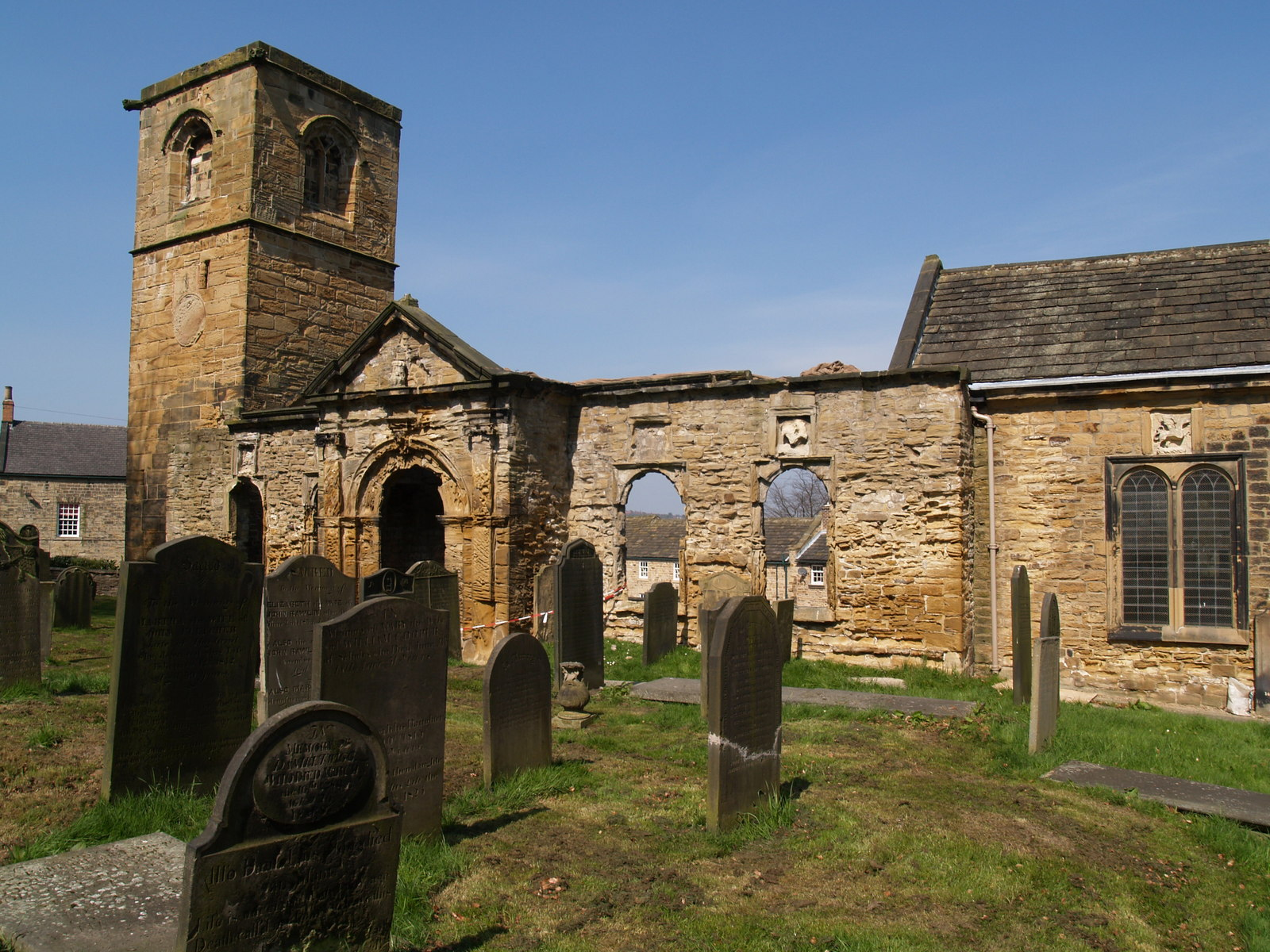
- Holy Trinity old Church, Wentworth, from the south

- Location in South Yorkshire
- OS grid reference: SK 383 982
- Location: Wentworth, South Yorkshire
- Country: England
- Denomination: Anglican
- Website: Wentworth Church

History
- Dedication: Holy Trinity

Architecture
- Functional status: Redundant
- Heritage designation: Grade II*
- Designated: 29 March 1968
- Architectural type: Church
- Style: Gothic

Specifications
- Capacity: 40 Seated
- Materials: Sandstone, stone slate roofs

The Old Holy Trinity Church is a redundant Anglican church in the village of Wentworth, South Yorkshire, England. It is partly in ruins, and stands close to a newer church also dedicated to the Holy Trinity. The old church is recorded in the National Heritage List for England as a designated Grade II* listed building, and is in the care of the Churches Conservation Trust.

== History ==
The tower dates from the 14th–15th century, while the rest of the church was rebuilt in 1684 for William Wentworth, 2nd Earl of Strafford. A new church, designed by J. L. Pearson was built nearby in 1872–76. The nave of the old church was dismantled in the later part of the 19th century. In 1925 the chancel and a chapel were restored for William Wentworth-Fitzwilliam, 7th Earl Fitzwilliam. Further renovation was carried out in 1985. Holy Trinity was declared redundant on 12 February 1975, and was vested in the trust on 2 July 1976.

== Architecture ==
The tower is constructed in ashlar sandstone and the rest of the church in rubble sandstone. The roofs of the chancel and chapel are in stone slate. Its plan consists of a west tower, a partly ruined five-bay nave, and a chancel with a north chapel. The truncated tower has two stages. In the lower stage is a small west window, and in the upper stage are two-light bell openings. Only the south wall of the nave remains. This has a central protruding doorway flanked by Ionic pilasters, and round-arched windows without tracery or glass. The chancel has a central south door with a cartouche above it, on each side of which are two-light round-headed windows. Both the chapel and the chancel have three-light windows. On the north wall are a two-light and a three-light window, while on the west wall are two three-light windows. Inside the chancel is a chancel arch and a two-bay arcade. There are a number of memorials, the most important of which are to the Earls of Strafford and other members of the Wentworth family. Other fittings have been removed. In the west end of the chancel are steps leading down to the Fitzwilliam vault.

== See also ==
- List of churches preserved by the Churches Conservation Trust in Northern England
- Grade II* listed buildings in South Yorkshire
- Listed buildings in Wentworth, South Yorkshire
