= Keppel's Column =

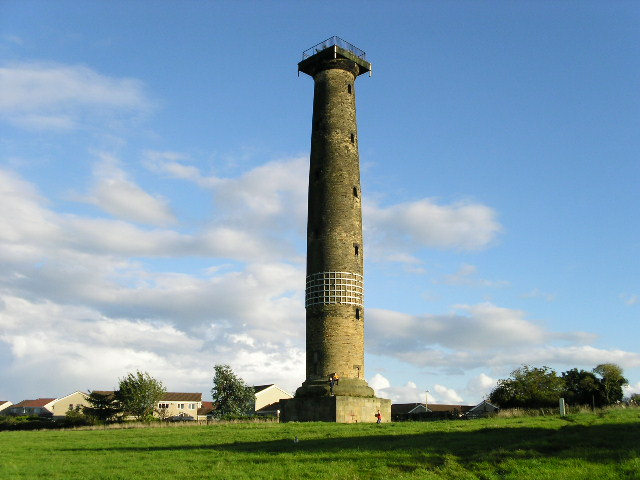
- Keppel's Column

- Location within South Yorkshire
- 53°26′53″N 1°24′55″W
- Type: Folly
- Location: Wentworth
- OS grid reference: SK 38941 94731

History
- Built: 1773-1780

Site notes
- Area: South Yorkshire
- Architect: John Carr

Listed Building – Grade II*
- Official name: Keppels Column
- Designated: 19 February 1986
- Reference no.: 1314632

Keppel's Column is a 115-foot (35 m) tower Grade II* listed building between Wentworth and Kimberworth in Rotherham, South Yorkshire, England. Keppel's Column is one of several follies in and around Wentworth Woodhouse park; the others include Hoober Stand and Needle's Eye.

== History ==
The column was built in the late-18th century to commemorate the acquittal of the court-martialled Admiral Augustus Keppel after the Battle of Ushant. It was commissioned in 1773 by Charles Watson-Wentworth, 2nd Marquess of Rockingham and designed by John Carr. The column was finished in 1780. It was initially intended to be a landscape feature composed of pedestal surmounted by an obelisk, though at some stage the design was changed to a tall column.

In October 2021, the column was one of 142 sites across England to receive part of a £35-million grant from the government's Culture Recovery Fund.

== Structure ==
It visibly bulges due to an entasis correction, which was rendered inappropriate when funding problems reduced the height. The column, which has an internal spiral staircase, is located on a prominent hill on the southern extent of the Wentworth Estates. The hill is more than 480 ft (150 m) above mean sea level and is one of the highest hills in the Borough of Rotherham, second only to the hill on which Hoober Stand is located.

Keppel's Column had been closed to the public since the 1960s due to being unsafe, as it was in a derelict state, but was reopened to the public in September 2022. The column can be viewed at close quarters from the public footpath running from Admiral's Crest in Scholes.

== See also ==
- Grade II* listed buildings in South Yorkshire
- Listed buildings in Rotherham (Keppel Ward)
