= Needle's Eye =

18th century pyramid in Wentworth, South Yorkshire, northern England

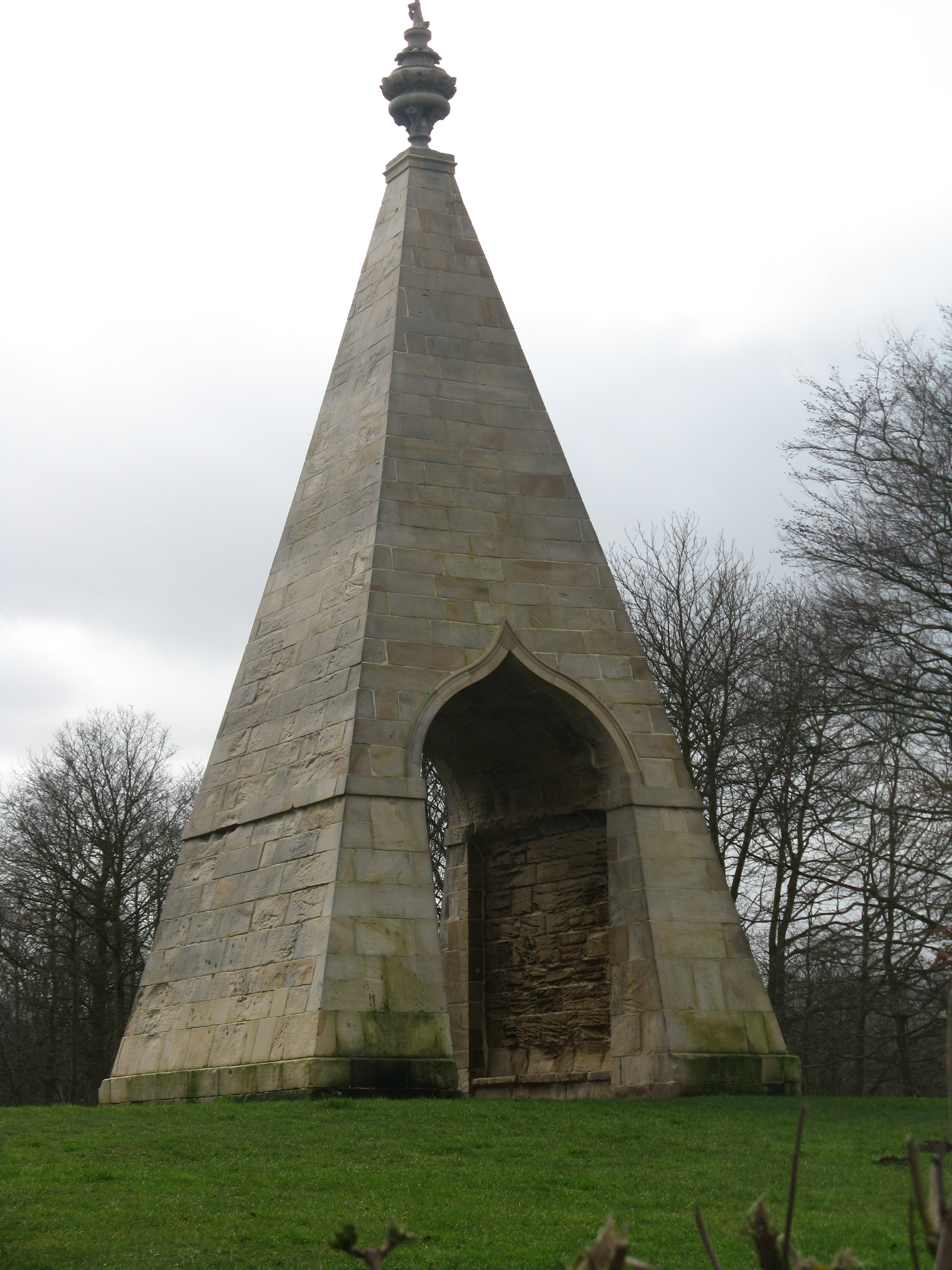
- Needle's Eye in 2012

- Location within South Yorkshire
- 53°29′05″N 1°24′16″W
- Type: Folly
- Location: Wentworth
- OS grid reference: SK 39622 98821

History
- Built: Mid-late 18th century

Site notes
- Area: South Yorkshire
- Architect: John Carr

Listed Building – Grade II*
- Official name: Needle's Eye
- Designated: 29 March 1968
- Reference no.: 1314588

Needle's Eye is a 14-metre (46 ft) pyramid Grade II* listed building which is situated in Wentworth, South Yorkshire in northern England. Needle's Eye is one of several follies in and around Wentworth Woodhouse park; the others include Hoober Stand and Keppel's Column.

== History ==
The monument was built by Thomas Watson-Wentworth, first Marquess of |Rockingham, after 1722, but before 1728, when it was first illustrated in an engraving. It was the earliest of several follies in the park, which served as eyecatchers for the house. While it was originally independent, from the late 18th century the drive to the house (now disused) ran through its archway. John Carr designed Needle's Eye alongside other follies in the area.

The structure was first recorded with the name 'Needle's Eye', a common name for arched follies, on the 1841 Ordnance Survey map.

Pockmark holes seen on one side of the Needle's Eye

== Location ==
Needle's Eye is situated between two disused horse and carriage paths. The area is open to public.

== Structure ==
It is a pyramid made of sandstone topped with a funerary urn, encompassing an archway of approximately 3-metre (9.8 ft). The wideness of the archway is roughly enough for a coach and horses to pass through, which fits its alleged purpose of creation.

== Folklore ==
The folly is often claimed to have been made in order to win a wager, where the second Marquess of Rockingham claimed he was able to "drive a coach and horses through an eye of a needle", in reference to the biblical declaration that it would be easier for a camel to pass through the eye of a needle than for a rich man to enter the kingdom of heaven (Luke 18:25).

One side of the structure is heavily pockmarked. It is alleged execution by firing squad may have taken place at the building since they resemble Musket balls; however this is unsubstantiated.

== In popular culture ==
Needle's Eye was used as a location in the film Wuthering Heights (2026).

== See also ==
- Grade II* listed buildings in South Yorkshire
- Listed buildings in Wentworth, South Yorkshire
