= Wentworth, South Yorkshire =

Village and civil parish in South Yorkshire, England

Coordinates: 53.4820°N 1.4190°W

Wentworth
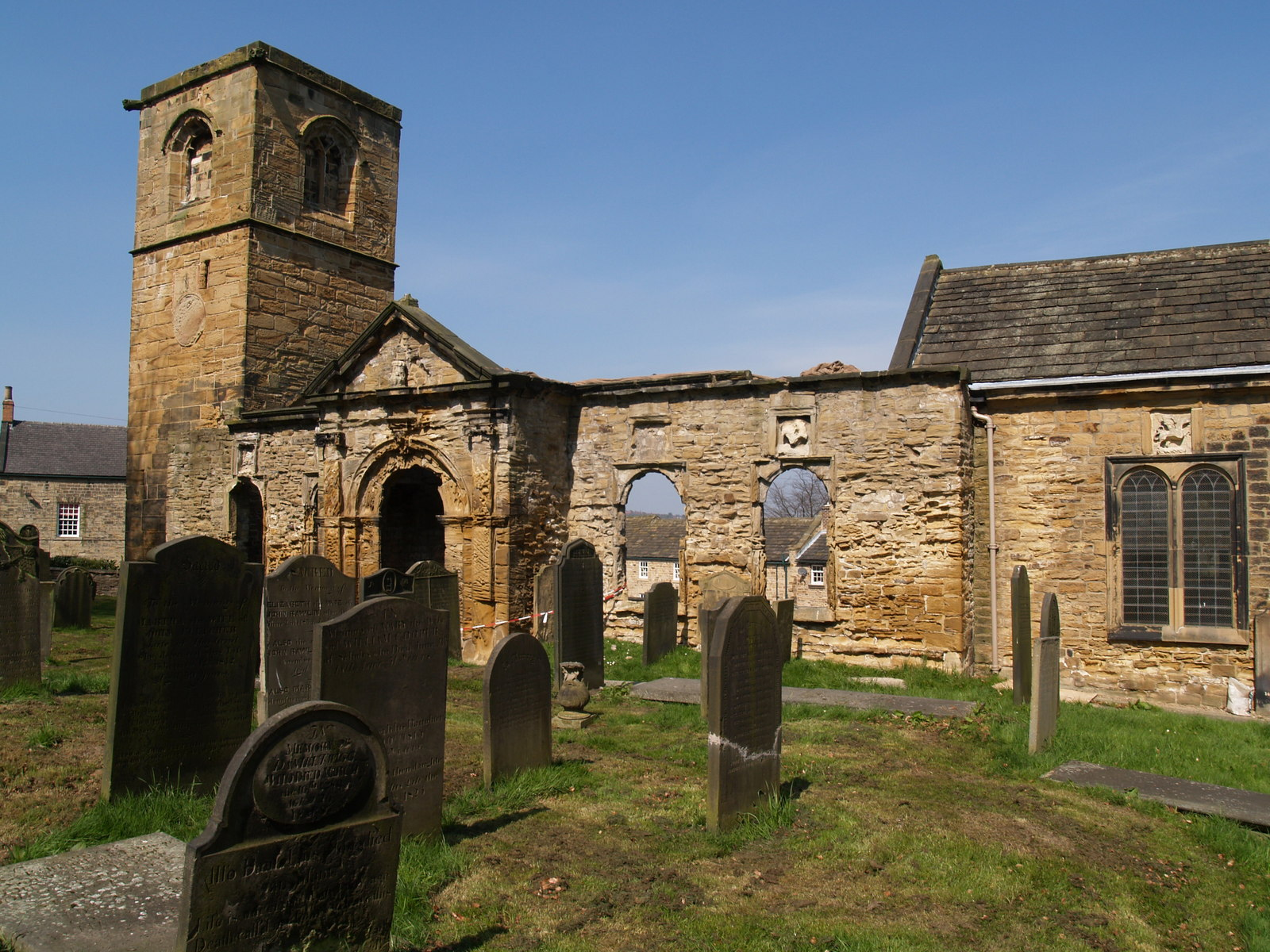
- Old Holy Trinity Church, Wentworth

- Location within South Yorkshire
- Population: 1,478 (2011 census)
- OS grid reference: SK385985
- Civil parish: Wentworth
- Metropolitan borough: Rotherham
- Metropolitan county: South Yorkshire
- Region: Yorkshire and the Humber
- Country: England
- Sovereign state: United Kingdom
- Post town: ROTHERHAM
- Postcode district: S62
- Dialling code: 01226
- Police: South Yorkshire
- Fire: South Yorkshire
- Ambulance: Yorkshire
- UK Parliament: Rawmarsh and Conisbrough

Wentworth is a village and civil parish in the Metropolitan Borough of Rotherham in South Yorkshire, England.

The village is surrounded by the very urbanised areas of Hoyland Nether, Barnsley. In the 2001 Census the parish had a population of 1,223, increasing to 1,478 at the 2011 Census.

Wentworth village lies 4 miles north of Rotherham town centre, 6½ miles south of Barnsley town centre, and 9 miles north of Sheffield city centre.

The civil parish includes the village of Harley on the B6090 road to the west of the main settlement.

== History ==
The name Wentworth probably derives from the Old English Wintraworð meaning 'Wintra's enclosure'.

The village's history is dominated by the Wentworth, Watson-Wentworth and Wentworth-Fitzwilliam families who lived in Wentworth Woodhouse. They also owned perhaps most of the land in the village. Wentworth gained some independence when the Fitzwilliam family line ended in 1979.

The village dates back to at least 1066, according to the Domesday Book. About 1250 Robert Wentworth married Emma Woodhouse, beginning the Wentworth-Woodhouse line; the family lived in the area for over 450 years. The lands then passed to the Watson family when William Wentworth, 2nd Earl of Strafford died without heir; the Watsons held the land until 1782. During this time most of the local follies were built. The Fitzwilliam ownership ended in 1979 when Thomas Wentworth-Fitzwilliam, 10th Earl Fitzwilliam died.

The Old Holy Trinity Church, the village's first church was a chapel of ease to All Saints Church, Wath Upon Dearne. Like its successor it was the principal place of worship on the estate, dedicated to the Holy Trinity, and is thought to date to the 12th century. James Nasmyth, the developer of the steam hammer, and his bride Anne Hartop were married there on 16 June 1840.

The new church, Holy Trinity Parish Church, was commissioned in 1872 by the 6th Earl Fitzwilliam to the design of John Loughborough Pearson, an exponent of the Gothic Revival style, and was consecrated in 1877 by the Archbishop of York.

In September 1999 Wentworth Brewery was established at the old power station on the Wentworth estate. The Brewery ceased trading at the beginning of June 2016.

== Landmarks ==
The village has cottages and houses of architectural and historic interest. The site of the village stocks in Main Street is now occupied by a telephone kiosk; opposite is the base of the village cross. The oldest known cottage, Ivy Cottage (a cruck cottage off Main Street), is attached to Snowdrop Farm.

The major landmark is the country house Wentworth Woodhouse. In the grounds of the house are 21 follies, including the Needle's Eye, Hoober Stand, Keppel's Column, the Rockingham Mausoleum, the Ionic Temple and Doric Temple, the Vinegar Stone, and the Bean Seat. Close to Hoober Stand is the Hoober Observatory of the Mexborough & Swinton Astronomical Society. The Wentworth Brewery was based in the old power house until it ceased trading in June 2016.

== See also ==
- Listed buildings in Wentworth, South Yorkshire
- Earl Fitzwilliam
