= Hoober Stand =

Tower in Wentworth, South Yorkshire, England

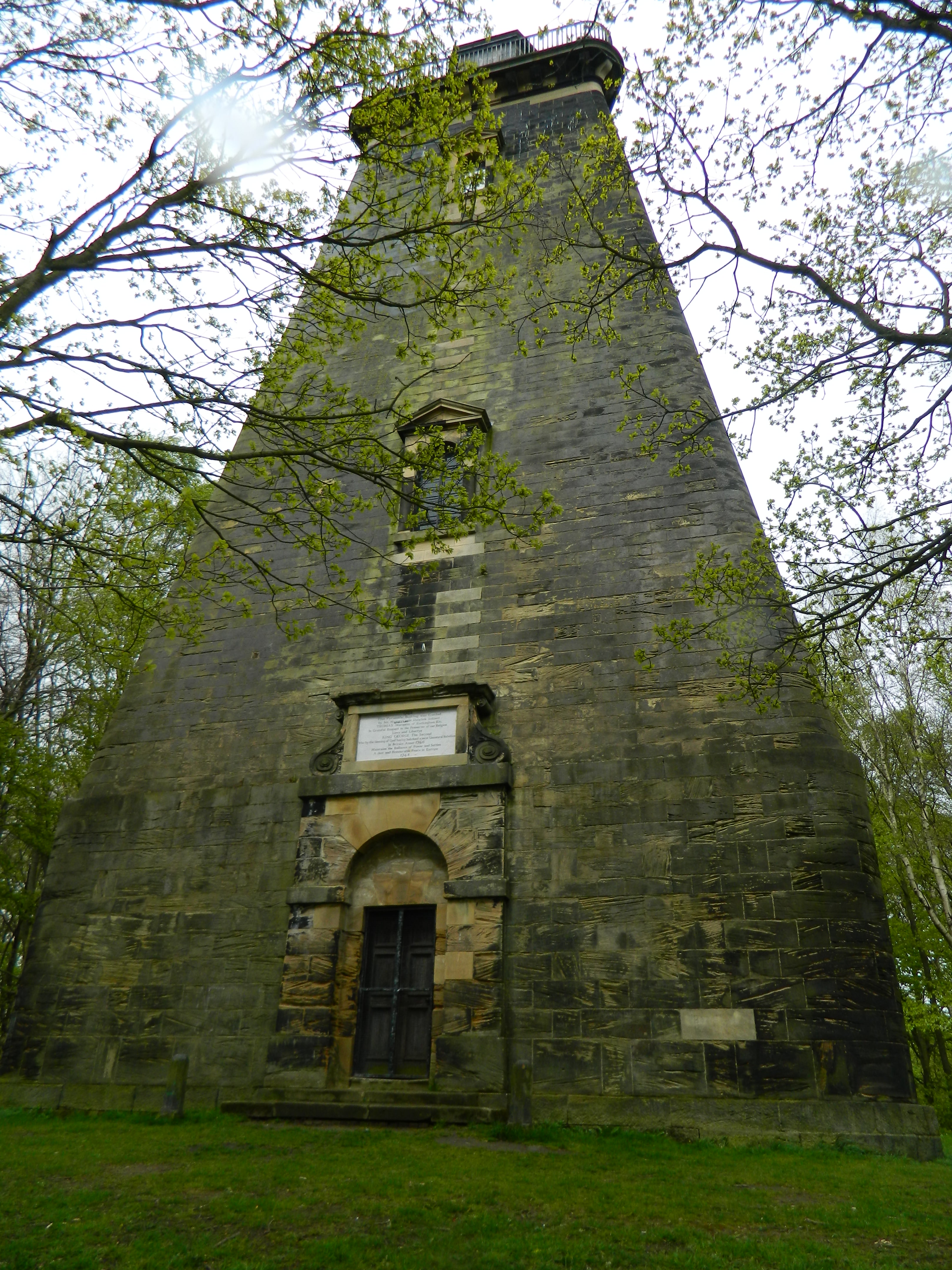
- Hoober Stand in 2015

- Location within South Yorkshire
- 53°28′55″N 1°23′15″W
- Type: Folly
- Location: Wentworth
- OS grid reference: SK 40747 98545

History
- Built: 1748

Site notes
- Area: South Yorkshire
- Architect: Henry Flitcroft

Listed Building – Grade II*
- Official name: Hoober Stand
- Designated: 29 April 1952
- Reference no.: 1132812

Hoober Stand is a 30-metre-high (98 ft) tower and Grade II* listed building on a ridge in Wentworth, South Yorkshire in northern England. It was designed by Henry Flitcroft for the Whig aristocrat Thomas Watson-Wentworth, Earl of Malton (later the 1st Marquess of Rockingham) to commemorate the quashing of the 1745 Jacobite rebellion. It lies close to his country seat Wentworth Woodhouse. Its site is approximately 157 metres (515 ft) above sea level and from the top there are long-distance views on a clear day. Hoober Stand is one of several follies in and around Wentworth Woodhouse park; the others include Needle's Eye and Keppel's Column. Sidney Oldall Addy, the Sheffield author calls the structure Woburn Stand in his 1888 book, A glossary of words used in the neighbourhood of Sheffield.

== History ==
Thomas Watson-Wentworth (the Earl of Malton and Lord Lieutenant of the West Riding of Yorkshire) fought for the British Government against the 1745 Jacobite rising. When the rebellion was crushed, George II elevated the earl to the 1st Marquess of Rockingham (the title Earl of Malton passed to his only surviving son). Watson-Wentworth commissioned architect Henry Flitcroft to design a commemorative monument.

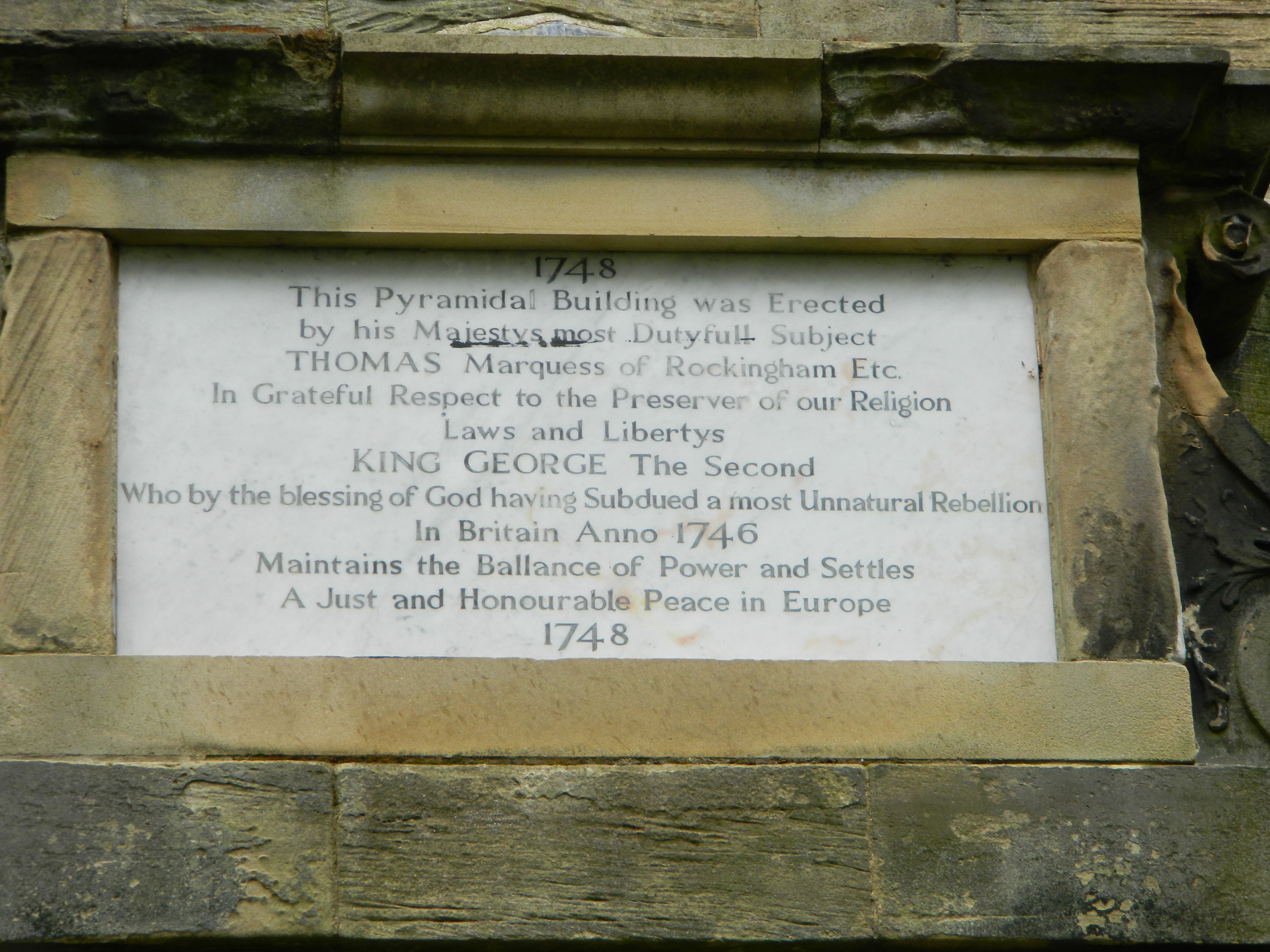
The plaque above the doorway

Construction lasted from 1746 to 1748, and the structure cost £3,000. The inscription above the doorway reads:

"1748
This Pyramidal Building was Erected
by his Majestys most Dutyfull Subject
THOMAS Marquess of Rockingham Etc.
In Grateful Respect to the Preserver of our Religion
Laws and Libertys
KING GEORGE The Second
Who by the blessing of God having Subdued a most Unnatural Rebellion
In Britain Anno 1746
Maintains the Ballance of Power and Settles
A just and Honourable peace in Europe
1748"

== Location ==
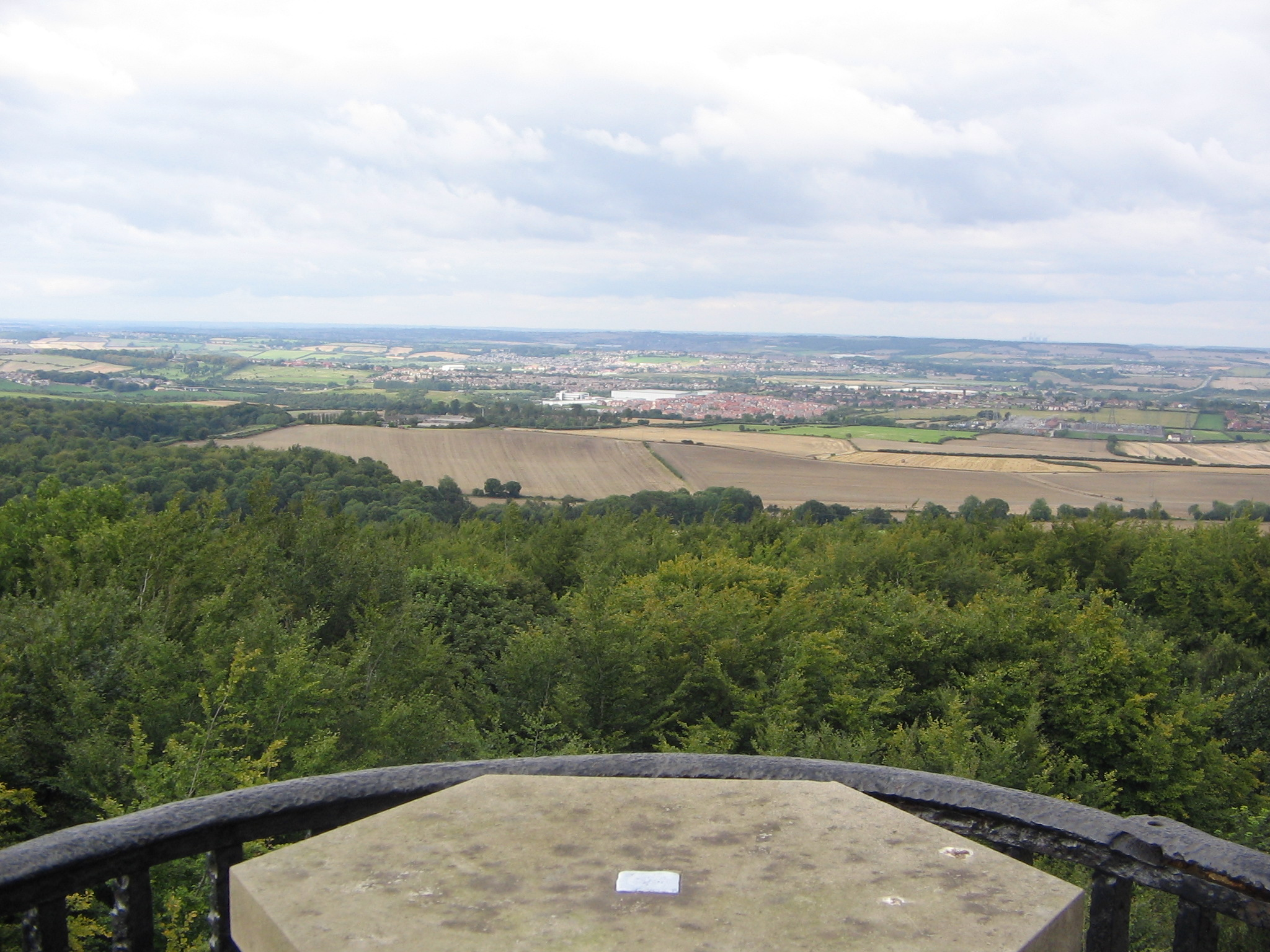
View north from the top

Hoober Stand is situated on a high ridge some 157 metres (515 ft) above sea level in a rural area near Rotherham, and is less than a mile from the village of Wentworth. Vehicular access is along Lea Brook Lane, north of the stand, to a car park next to the monument.

== Structure ==
The tower, an equilateral triangle with rounded corners in section and about 30 metres tall, is built in ashlar sandstone. Its three walls are perpendicular to the ground for 4.5 metres (15 ft) then taper to a hexagonal cupola surrounded by a triangular viewing platform reached by an internal helical stairway of 150 steps. It is believed that the three walls under the cupola represented England (including Wales), Scotland and Ireland all under one crown. The exterior is very plain but the interior is more decorative.

The stairway is lit by five stairway windows and two cupola windows.

The wall with the entrance door faces south. This wall has the second and fifth stairway windows (when ascending). On the north west wall the vast majority of the stonework is original. It has the third stairway window. The stand's lightning conductor runs down this wall. The north east wall has the first and fourth stairway windows.

At the top of the tower is the hexagonal cupola with a domed roof. It is surrounded by a triangular iron-railed viewing platform. Three of the cupola walls containing the door and windows are parallel to the tower walls. The door leads out onto the viewing platform. The platform is in the form of an equilateral triangle, with edges parallel to the south cupola wall and the windowed (north west and north east) cupola walls. The platform corners are adjacent to the cupola's three windowless (north, south east and south west) walls. Each corner has a decorative stone hexagonal-topped pedestal.

The inward taper of the upper part of the three walls causes an optical illusion that the stand is falling over. The cupola, although situated over the centre of the building, appears to move from side to side as the tower is approached from different angles.

== See also ==
- Grade II* listed buildings in South Yorkshire
- Listed buildings in Wentworth, South Yorkshire
