= East Ecclesfield =

Electoral ward in the City of Sheffield, South Yorkshire, England

Coordinates: 53°26′35″N 1°28′12″W

- Shown within Sheffield

- Location within Sheffield
- Area: 3.8 sq mi (9.8 km^{2})
- Population: 18,295
  - Density: 4,814/sq mi (1,859/km^{2})
- Metropolitan borough: City of Sheffield
- Metropolitan county: South Yorkshire
- Region: Yorkshire and the Humber
- Country: England
- Sovereign state: United Kingdom
- UK Parliament: Penistone and Stocksbridge
- Councillors: Craig Gamble-Pugh (Labour); Alan Woodcock (Lib Dem); Robert Reiss (Lib Dem)

East Ecclesfield ward—which includes the districts of Chapeltown and Ecclesfield—is one of the 28 electoral wards in City of Sheffield, England. It is located in the northern part of the city and covers an area of 3.8 square miles (9.8 km^{2}) in the eastern part of Ecclesfield Parish. The population of this ward in 2021 was 18,017 people. East Ecclesfield was previously one of the six wards that make up the Sheffield Hillsborough Parliamentary constituency. The Boundary Commission for England, in their final report, recommended that East Ecclesfield should become part of a reformed Penistone and Stocksbridge constituency. The East Ecclesfield ward is composed of eight polling districts. These include Blackburn, Chapeltown, Ecclesfield, Ecclesfield Common, High Greave, Horbury, Warren and Wheata.

== Districts in East Ecclesfield ward ==
=== Ecclesfield ===
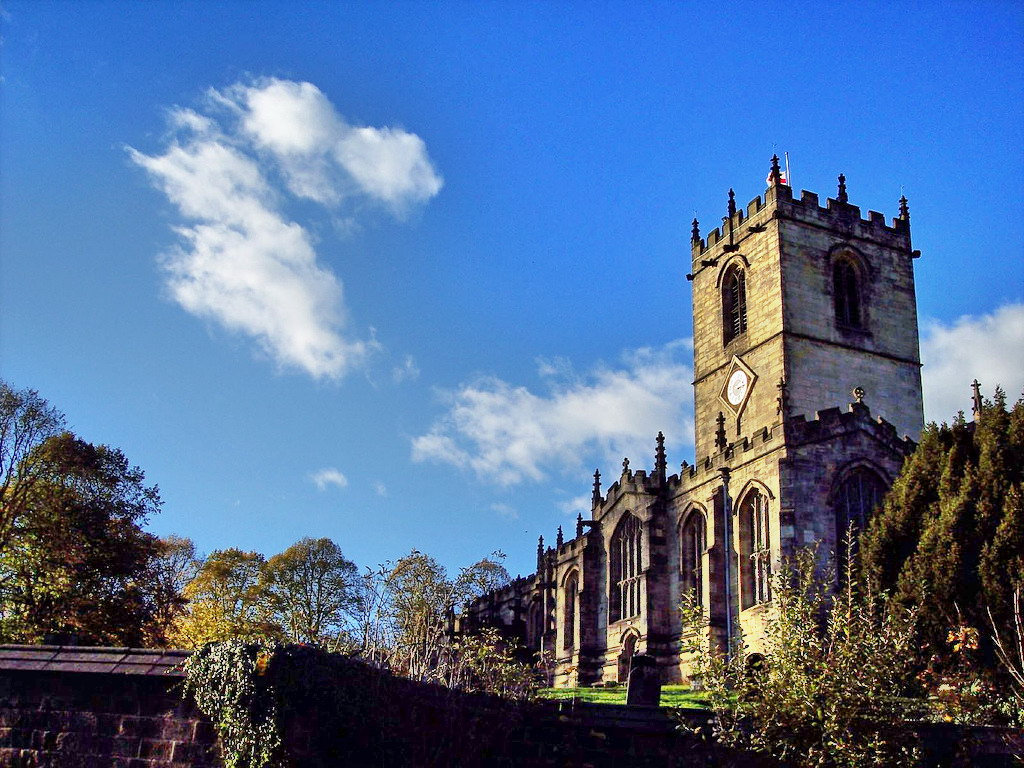
St Mary's Church, Ecclesfield

Ecclesfield (grid reference SK353942) is a village, now a northern suburb of Sheffield. It lies near the railway line from Sheffield to Barnsley. Until 1953, Ecclesfield had a railway station.

Notable buildings in Ecclesfield include St Mary's Church and Ecclesfield Priory.

=== Chapeltown ===
Chapeltown (grid reference SK355963) lies to the north of Ecclesfield. It has its own railway station and at junction 35 on the M1 motorway.
