= Firth Wood =

Woodland in Stocksbridge, South Yorkshire, England

- Location within South Yorkshire
- Interactive map of Firth Wood

Geography
- Location: South Yorkshire, England
- OS grid: SK291959
- Coordinates: 53.459°N 1.562°W
- Area: 16.9 acres (6.84 ha)

Administration
- Authority: Woodland Trust

Firth Wood is a woodland in South Yorkshire, England, near the village of Oughtibridge. It covers a total area of 16.9 acres (6.84 ha). It is owned and managed by the Woodland Trust.
