= Barnes Hall, South Yorkshire =

Grade II listed country house in South Yorkshire, England

Coordinates: 53.456664°N 1.492763°W

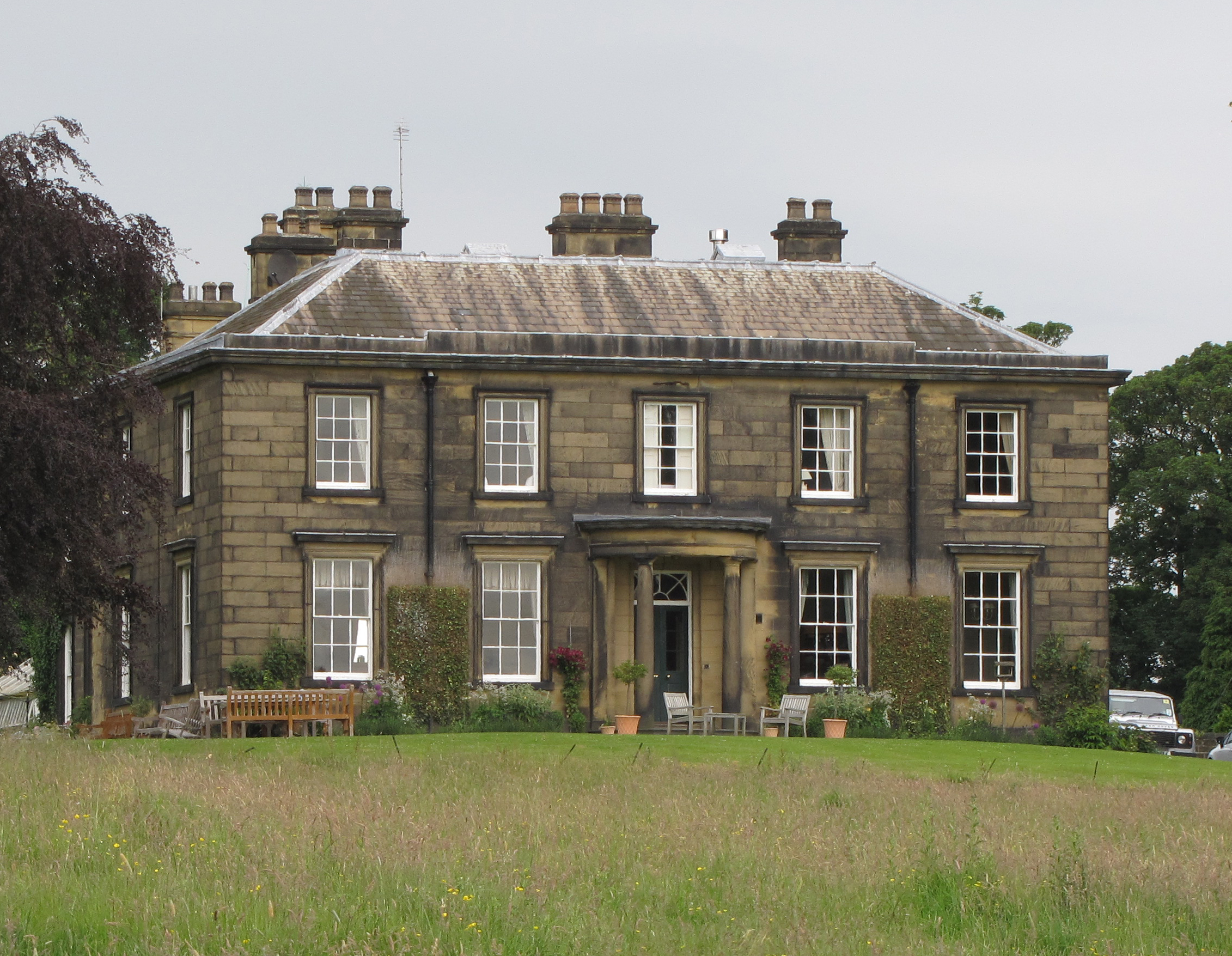

Barnes Hall is an English country house near Burncross within the City of Sheffield in England. The estate includes the buildings of the adjacent Barnes Hall farm.

== History ==
=== Original hall ===
The present Barnes Hall was built in 1824, but there has been a building on the site since at least the reign of Edward III (1327-1377) when it appeared in a roll of dependencies of the Manor of Sheffield and was known as Manerium de Bernes. The first known occupants of the building were the Barnes family who lived there in the 13th and 14th centuries. The estate then passed by marriage to the Bromley family who sold it to Robert Shatton in 1442. Shatton sold the hall in 1477 for £140 to Thomas Rotherham who served as Archbishop of York and Lord Chancellor during his lifetime. Rotherham was also known as named 'Scot' but he took the name of his birthplace Rotherham as his surname. He came from a family with long term connections with the Parish of Ecclesfield, and owned the hall until his death from Bubonic plague on 29 May 1500, aged 76.

After the death of Thomas Rotherham the hall eventually passed to his brother George Scott, there then followed several generations of Scott's who transformed Barnes Hall into one of the finest gentry houses in Ecclesfield parish. During the 16th and 17th century the adjacent Barnes Hall farm was built and developed 200 metres to the north as arable farming became important to the estate. At this time, the main hall consisted of an open main room with a large gothic door and two storied cross wings in a late medieval style. The last of the line of Scotts was Sir Richard Scott who died in Ireland on 17 July 1638, aged 55 while acting as one of the deputies of Thomas Wentworth, 1st Earl of Strafford. Sir Richard who has a fine alabaster memorial in Ecclesfield church, left money in his will to build the nearby Barnes Hall Hospital, a set of tenements for six poor people. The hall itself was left to his half brother Richard Watts whose descendants held it until December 1823 when it was bought by William Smith of Cowley Manor in Ecclesfield.

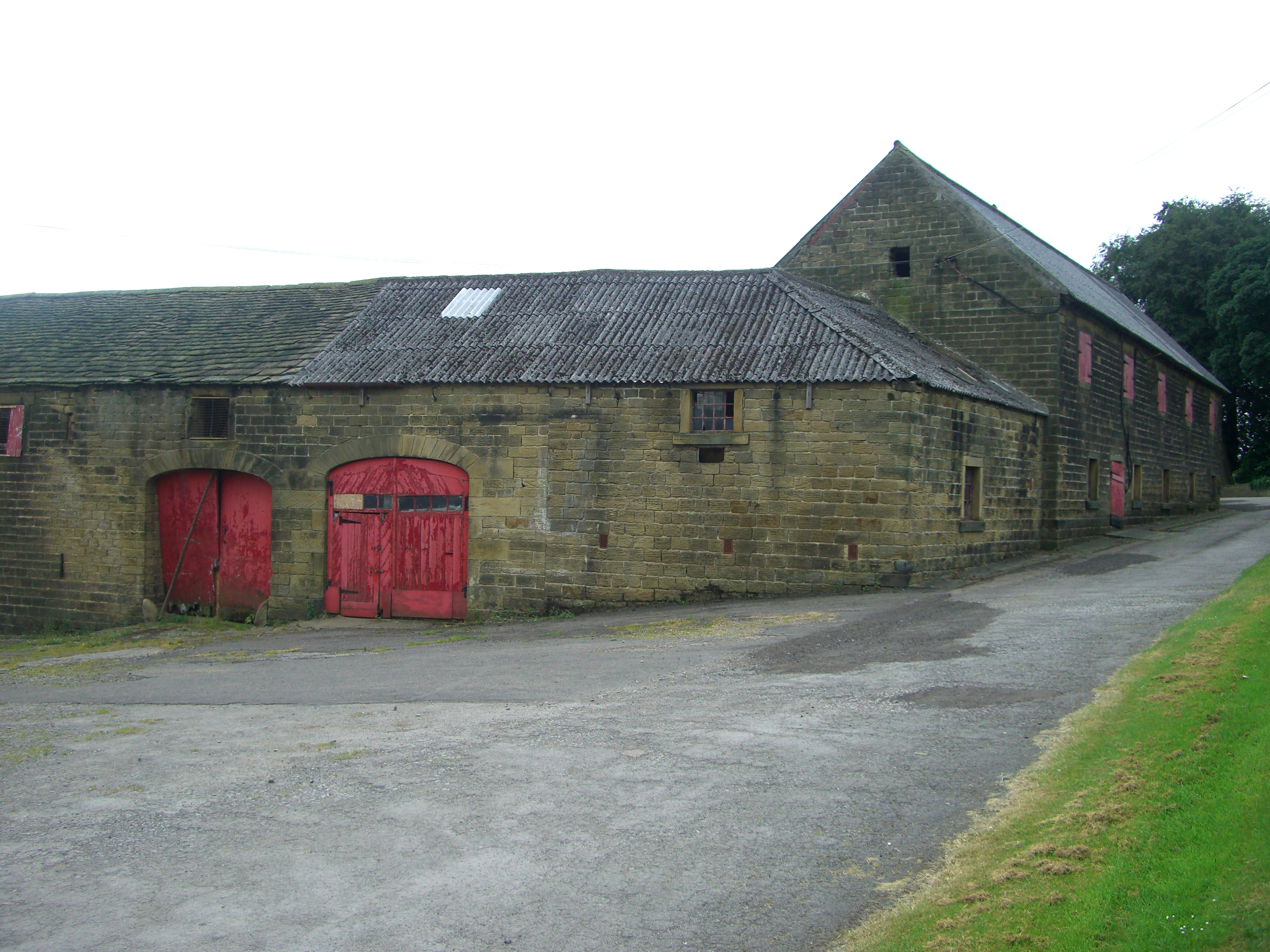
The north and west barns are to be converted into dwellings.

=== New hall is built ===
William Smith was a local solicitor, landowner and owner of the Smith and Redfern brewery, he demolished the old hall and constructed the present hall in 1824, at this time the business side of the estate moved towards mixed farming with some of the barns being adapted for the use of animals. The new hall was built from sandstone blocks with a Welsh slate roof. It has five bays with an open semicircular stone front porch with two Doric columns. The majority of the windows are sashes. In the latter part of the 19th century a south facing wing was added. The Smith family remained at Barnes Hall until 1956 when the last of the family line Colonel William Mckenzie Smith died. The estate was broken up at this time and the Smith's tenant farmer Byron Shaw purchased Barnes Hall Farm.

In 2013 the buildings of Barnes Hall farm were purchased by the Open House Project who aim to convert the farm buildings into a series of dwellings.

==== Listed status ====
The main hall is a Grade II listed building and has been so since August 1985, the dovecote which stands 75 metres to the north and dates from 1740 is also listed as is the cartshed which dates from around 1820. In February 2013, the north and west barns of Barnes Hall farm were designated as Grade II listed buildings.
