= Beeley Wood =

Woodland in South Yorkshire, England

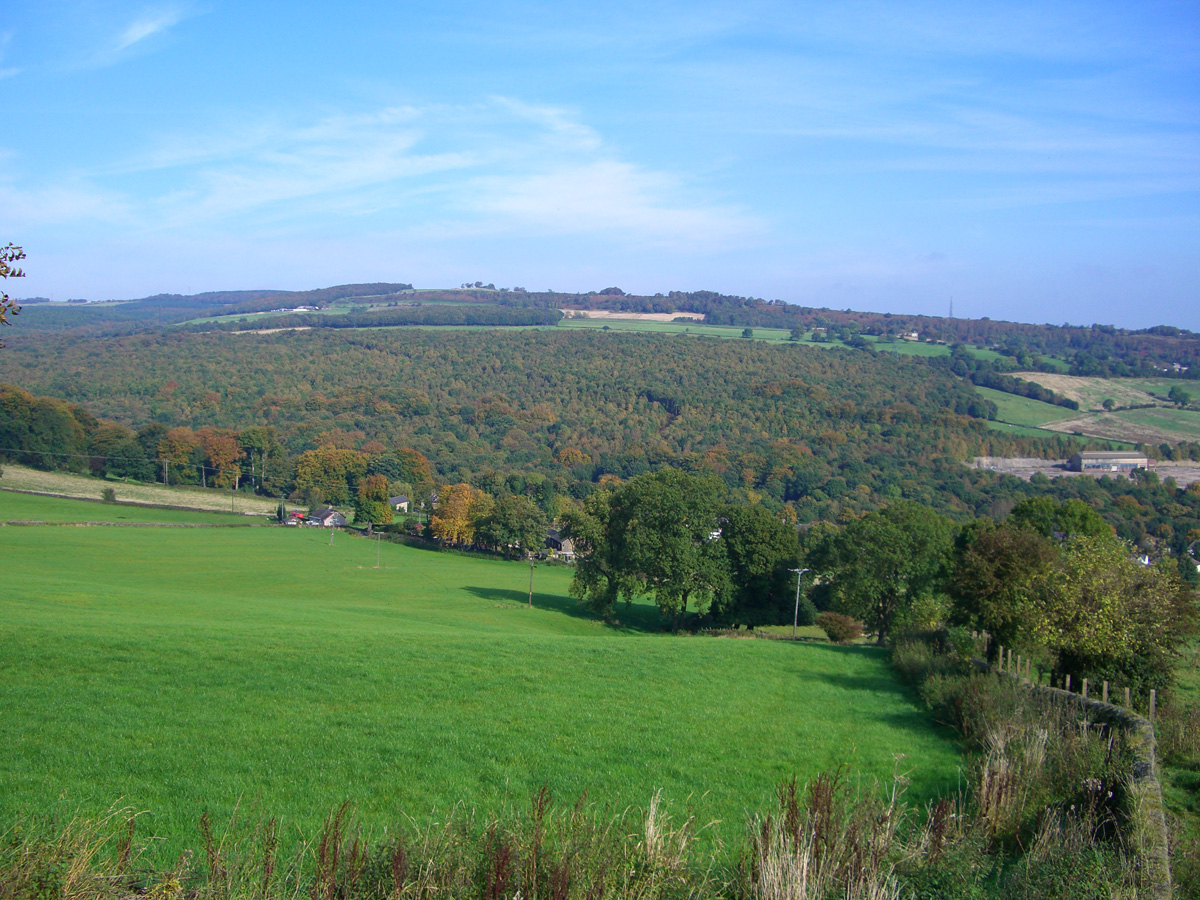
- Beeley Wood seen from the south-west across the upper Don valley

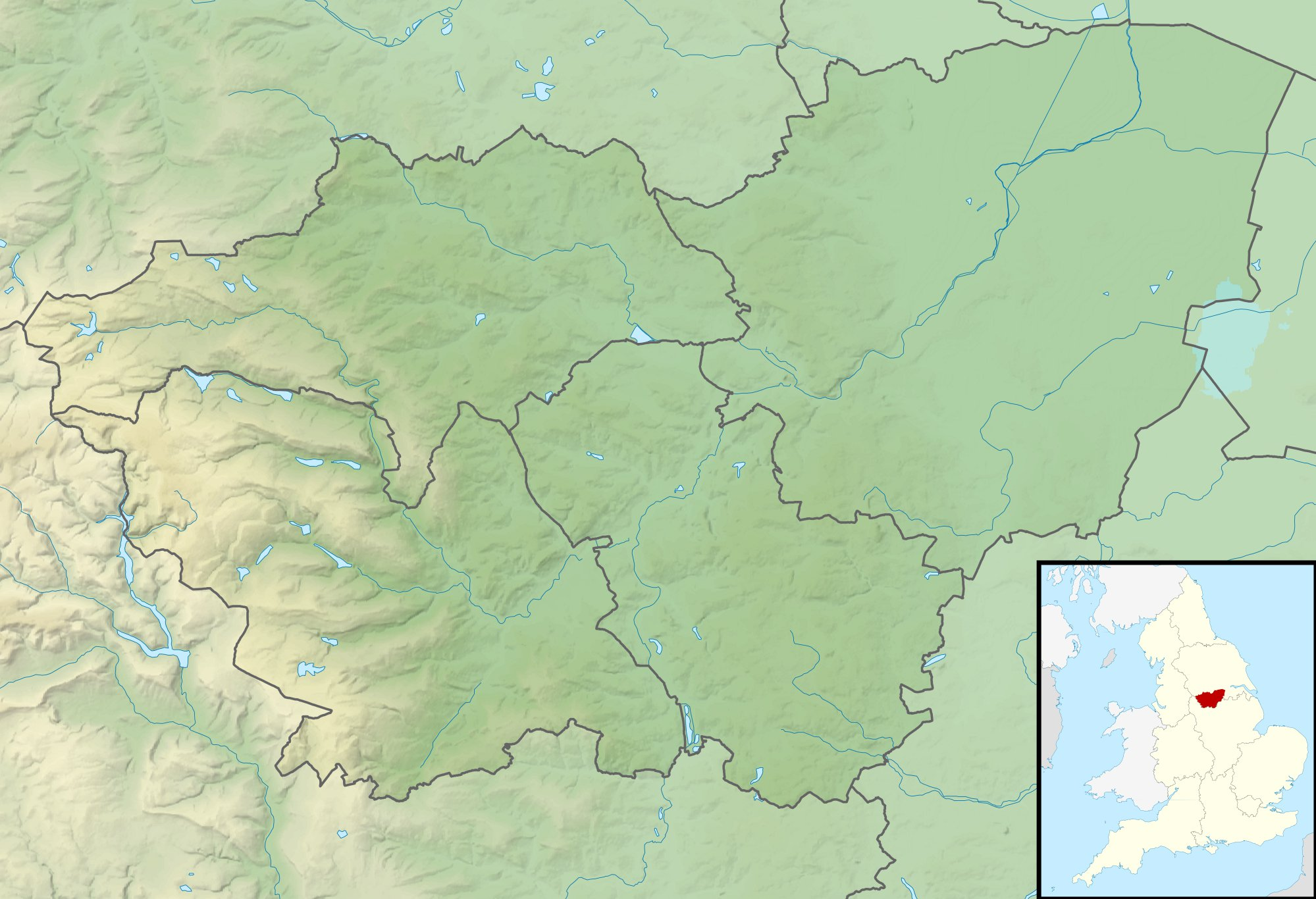
- Location within South Yorkshire
- Interactive map of Beeley Wood
- Type: woodland
- Location: City of Sheffield, South Yorkshire, England
- Coordinates: 53°25′47″N 1°31′32″W

Beeley Wood is a woodland in the north of the City of Sheffield, near Middlewood, South Yorkshire, England. It is one of 35 ancient woodland areas within the Sheffield city boundary. An ancient woodland is defined as a site that has been continuously occupied by woodland from the year 1600 or before.

== Overview ==
The woods are situated on the eastern side of the River Don between the village of Oughtibridge and the Sheffield suburb of Middlewood. The most common access from the Middlewood end of the wood is from the end of Clay Wheels Lane or from Middlewood Road South over the Don by the Rocher footbridge. The woods cover an area of approximately 150 acres (60 ha) and slope up quite steeply from the river gaining around 230 feet (70 m) in height before ending at farmland. The wood is traversed by two public footpaths;the lower of these is a pleasant and recently re-covered riverside walk which is part of the Upper Don Trail, a scenic walk by the river from the centre of Sheffield to Oughtibridge. The other public footpath runs the length of the upper wood at its highest point; there are many other paths not marked on the OS map. Beeley Wood is traversed by the famous Woodhead railway line; there is one level crossing and one footbridge for pedestrians to cross the line. The woods are home to a large colony of bats and all three species of woodpecker native to Britain can be seen in the woods. In spring there is a large covering of bluebells on the woodland floor. Wilson Spring Wood, a small area of wood, classed as an ancient and semi natural woodland, measuring approximately 980 by 820 feet (300 by 250 m) lies to the north-east of the main wood, separated by an area of farmers' fields 980 feet (300 m) in width.

== History ==
The earliest written reference to Beeley Wood is in a deed dated from 1161 in which the monks of Ecclesfield Priory were given permission to graze their flock every year from January to Easter in a large wood stretching from Birley Edge down to the River Don. Beeley Wood is a surviving part of this large wood and part of it is still called Priory Wood. In this 12th century document the wood was referred to as "BYLLHAUWODE" which is derived from the two Old English words Billa and haga and means Billa's enclosure and suggests that the woodland was originally attached to an Anglo-Saxon farm belonging to Billa. Further mention was made in a document released upon the death of Thomas de Furnival in 1332 when Beeley Wood was named as one of eleven locations under the heading of Woods, Moors and Commons. Under this agreement people were allowed to graze their animals in the wood. However, by the 16th century Beeley Wood had become a coppice wood in which the pasturing of animals was discouraged. At the end of the 16th century Beeley Wood was one of eleven coppice woods in Sheffield which were mentioned in a document drawn up for Gilbert Talbot, 7th Earl of Shrewsbury.

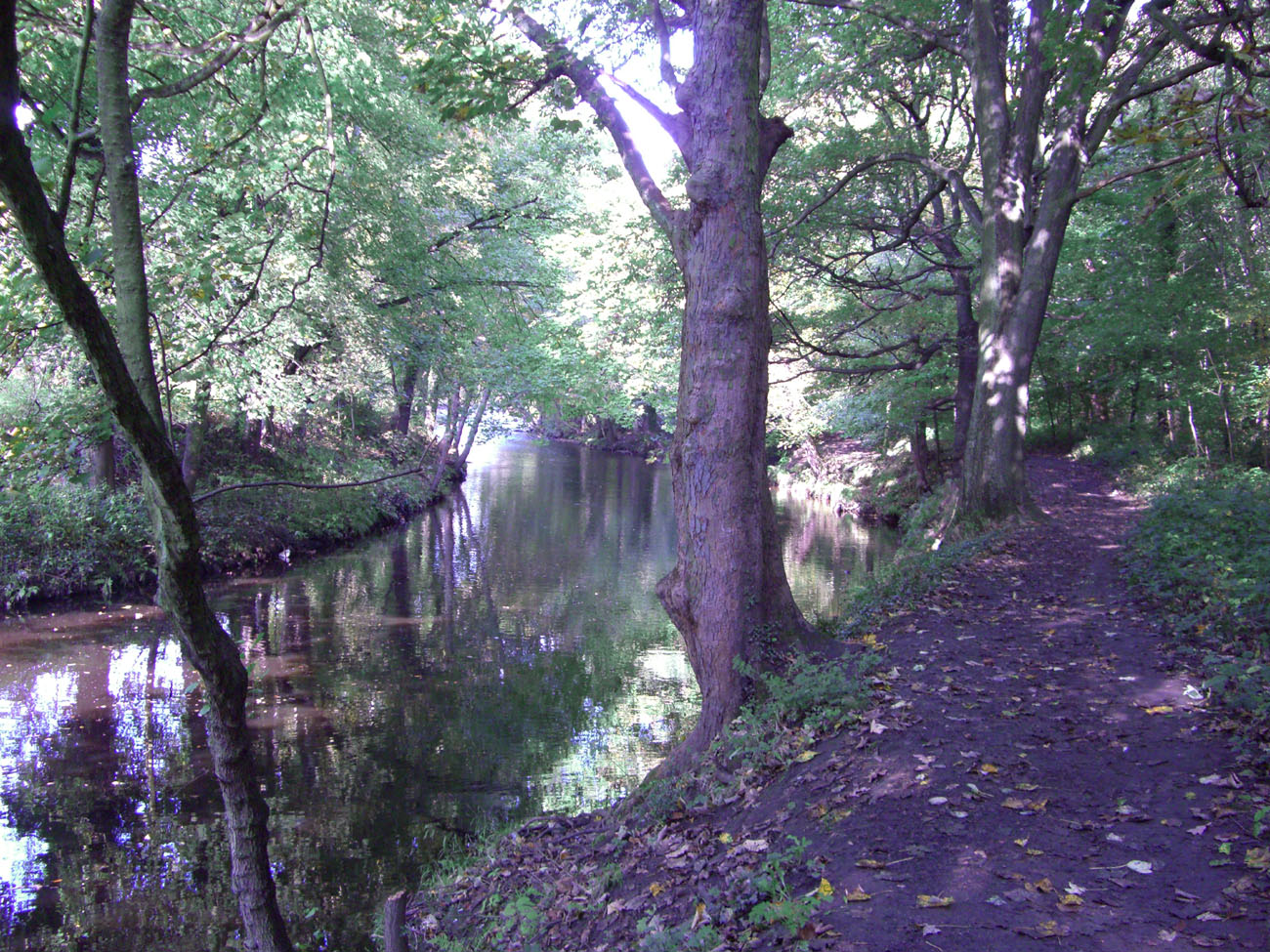
The River Don flowing through Beeley Wood.

By the 1890s the coppicing of Beeley Wood along with the other coppice woods in Sheffield was coming to an end because of reduced profits and woodland management problems. The wood was allowed to become a "high forest" with the strongest growth of a coppiced tree allowed to grow into a fully grown standard tree. Many of the older and sickly trees were cleared away at this time and replaced by saplings of trees that were not native to the Sheffield area, such as beech, sweet chestnut, common lime and sycamore. In late 1898 the Duke of Norfolk's forester planted Beeley Wood with 60 acres (24 ha) of timber trees such as ash, elm, sycamore, birch, lime, sweet chestnut and beech. The young trees were ordered from a nursery in Cheshire and were delivered to Wadsley Bridge railway station. In 2011 the Forestry Commission approved funding for a five-year plan to improve the unmanaged habitat of the wood; under the scheme an area of 9.6 acres (3.9 ha) will be coppiced and a further 2.7 acres (1.1 ha) will be thinned to allow more light and warmth into the wood and therefore improve conditions for wild flowers, insects and birds. In February 2016 the Environment Agency removed the middle two-thirds of Beeley Wood Lower Weir on the River Don as part of a scheme to allow the free migration of fish and let the river return to a more natural form.

== Mining and quarrying ==
Although not apparent today, Beeley Wood was once an area of industry with mining and quarrying taking place. Ganister was the material that was mined; this is a type of hard sandstone used in the manufacture of silica bricks used to line industrial furnaces. The Drift mining method was used because of the slope of the land in Beeley Wood and the mines went into the hillside for a long way and to a great depth. The fact that the wood is on a slope enabled gravity trackways to be used to transport the Ganister down to the valley bottom. The Ganister was also quarried in at least one location in the woods and the overgrown remnants of a large quarry can still be seen today. The largest of the mines was the Beeley Wood Mine, owned by the Silica Fire Brick Company and managed by J.T. Minnis for many years, in the 1920s and 1930s over 30 workers were employed and 12 ponies were used. In recent years the Coal Authority have inspected and fenced off various old shafts in the upper part of the wood.

=== Other industry ===
There is other industry on the eastern (Middlewood) fringes of the wood with the Beeley Wood Works situated at the end of Clay Wheels Lane, this is currently occupied by the Abbey Stainless Steel Company but has a long history dating back to 1749 when it was known as the Nova Scotia Tilt Company. For many years there was a large Union Carbide factory (formerly owned by British Acheson Electrodes Ltd., formerly Electrode Company of Sheffield Ltd., ) in this area manufacturing carbon electrodes for the steel industry, graphite rods for the nuclear industry and related products but this closed several years ago with the site lying disused for some time. In 1976 the plant employed 850 people with a subsidiary works in Wincobank, Sheffield, employing a further 150 people. The 45-acre (18 ha) site received planning permission in January 2009 to be used as a "Recycling Village" run by the firm Ballast Phoenix Ltd. who will initially recycle the ash from Sheffield's main Energy from Waste incinerator.
