= Whitley Hall =

16th-century mansion in South Yorkshire, England

Coordinates: 53.4496°N 1.4819°W

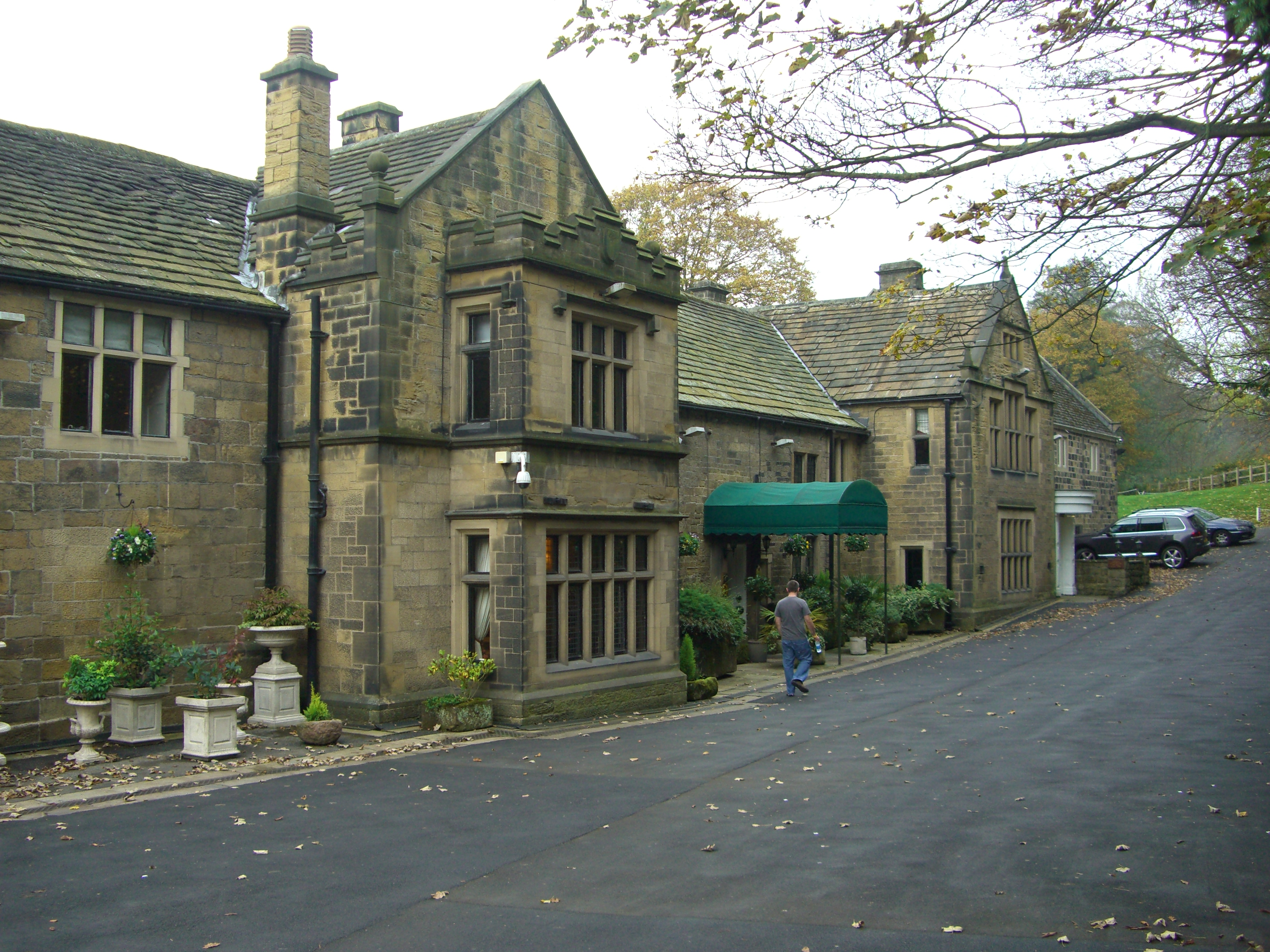
The front of the Hall.

Whitley Hall is a 16th-century mansion which since 1969 has been converted into a restaurant and then a hotel. It is situated in the northern rural district of the City of Sheffield in South Yorkshire, England. The small hamlet of Whitley lies in the countryside between the suburbs of Grenoside, Chapeltown and Ecclesfield some 7.5 km (4.7 mi) north of the city centre. The hall is a Grade II* listed building.

== History ==
Present day Whitley Hall dates from the 1580s, however a dwelling was present on the site prior to this. This dwelling, known as Launder House was first recorded in a deed of 1406 when it was transferred from John Cartwright to William Robinson. Launder House was also known as Launderhouse, Lownderhouse and Loundhouse over the years, in 1487 it passed into the hands of Thomas Parker who held the property in Copyhold from the Lord of the manor of Sheffield in return for ploughing and harvesting the land. The arrival of the Parkers at Launder House signalled the start of a 135-year association with the site over six generations.

It was the grandson of Thomas Parker, also known as Thomas who commenced the extensive rebuilding in the mid part of the 16th century which turned Launder House into Whitley Hall. Thomas’ son William is believed to have finished the rebuilding as a carving over one of the new doors reads,”Willm Parker : Made this Worke 1584”. In 1622 Thomas Shiercliffe became the owner of the Whitley Hall estate which beside the Hall also included a corn mill, dovecote, smelting house, eight fields, two acres of woodland and four cottages. The Hall remained the property of the Shiercliffe family until the early part of the 19th century.

=== Mary, Queen of Scots connection ===
A local legend states that Mary, Queen of Scots, spent a night at Whitley Hall in the 1580s while in captivity at Sheffield Castle. This rumour was first reported by Jonathan Eastwood in his History of Ecclesfield of 1862. However, there is no documentary evidence to back up the claim.

=== Boys' boarding school ===
Around the year 1790 the Hall was leased out by the Shiercliffes to John Rider who turned it into a boys' boarding school. The school is thought to have housed approximately 45 pupils with the most famous pupil being the railway engineer Sir John Fowler who travelled from nearby Wadsley to attend between 1826 and 1833. Fowler noted of his time at Whitley Hall later in life: “I was fairly quick in elementary scholarship, and in mental arithmetic was decidedly beyond the average of boys and men a gift which was of great convenience and value in after life.”

The exact time that the Hall remained a school is not known but by 1841 it was lived in by William Charlesworth who leased it from the Bingley family who had become the owners in 1816. The Bingleys family eventually moved into the Hall and lived there until 1939 when it was taken over by the army at the start of the Second World War with the officers and their servants being billeted in the Hall and the other ranks using the stable block and Nissen huts in the grounds.

=== Conversion to a restaurant and hotel ===
The Hall was owned by Hugh Bingley up until his death in 1962, although he never lived there after the war as he owned substantial properties in Cambridgeshire and the Hall was let out to tenants. In 1962 the Hall was bought by John I. Fearn, the head of a local firm of agricultural engineers. Mr. Fearn carried out considerable renovation and refurbishment over a period of seven years and Whitley Hall was opened as a restaurant in July 1969.

In the late 1970s the Hall became a hotel, initially with just three bedrooms. However, considerable extension work has been carried out over the years and the hotel now has 32 en-suite bedrooms. The extensive gardens have two small lakes. In May 1995, Whitley Hall was granted a licence carry out civil wedding services, the first location in South Yorkshire to become licensed. The hotel also offers six conference and meeting rooms. The restaurant, which is open to non-residents, is still an important part of the business.
