= Oughtibridge =

Village in Sheffield, South Yorkshire, England

Coordinates: 53.436°N 1.539°W

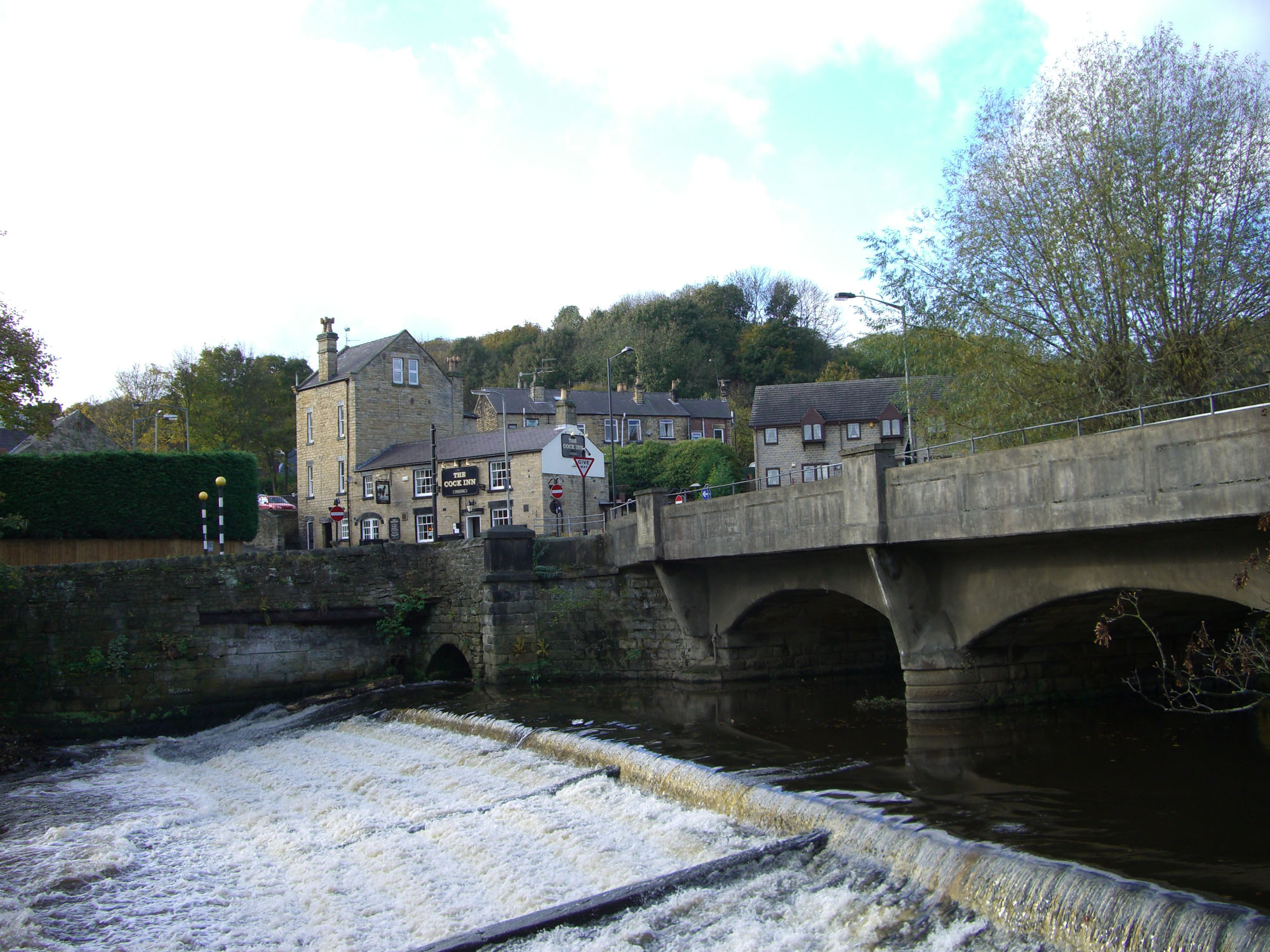
- The River Don flows under the road bridge at Oughtibridge with the Cock Inn pub in the background

- Location within South Yorkshire
- Population: 3,584 (2011 census)
- OS grid reference: SK3093
- Civil parish: Bradfield
- Metropolitan borough: Sheffield
- Metropolitan county: South Yorkshire
- Region: Yorkshire and the Humber
- Country: England
- Sovereign state: United Kingdom
- Post town: SHEFFIELD
- Postcode district: S35
- Dialling code: 0114
- Police: South Yorkshire
- Fire: South Yorkshire
- Ambulance: Yorkshire
- UK Parliament: Penistone and Stocksbridge

Oughtibridge (/ˈuːtɪbrɪdʒ/ OOT-i-brij) is a residential village in the north of Sheffield within the bounds of Bradfield civil parish. The village stands about 5 miles (8 km) northwest of the city centre in the valley of the River Don.

The population of the village has increased significantly in recent years because of much private housing development and stood at 3,542 in 2006 over an area of 355 hectares (880 acres). The population of Oughtibridge increased to 3,584 in 2011.

== History ==
=== Origins ===
The origins of Oughtibridge date back to the first part of the 12th century when a ford existed in the area over the Don. The ford was managed by a man named Oughtred who resided in a nearby cottage. When a bridge was built on the spot in approximately 1150 it became known as Oughtred's Bridge or by his nickname of Oughty's Bridge and the small settlement around the bridge adapted the same name.

The hamlet of Oughtibridge grew up as a focal point for local farming communities and the first documented mention of Oughtibridge occurred in 1161 when one of the signatories of an agreement on the grazing rights of Ecclesfield Priory was “Ralph, the son of Oughtred”. The name Ughtinabrigg, meaning Oughtred's Bridge in Middle English, was used in the document. The priory's grazing rights included Beeley Wood, a remnant of which still exists to the east of the village. Oughtibridge Hall was built on the high ground to the east of the hamlet in the 16th century; it still stands today and is a Grade-II-listed building.

=== Onesacre ===
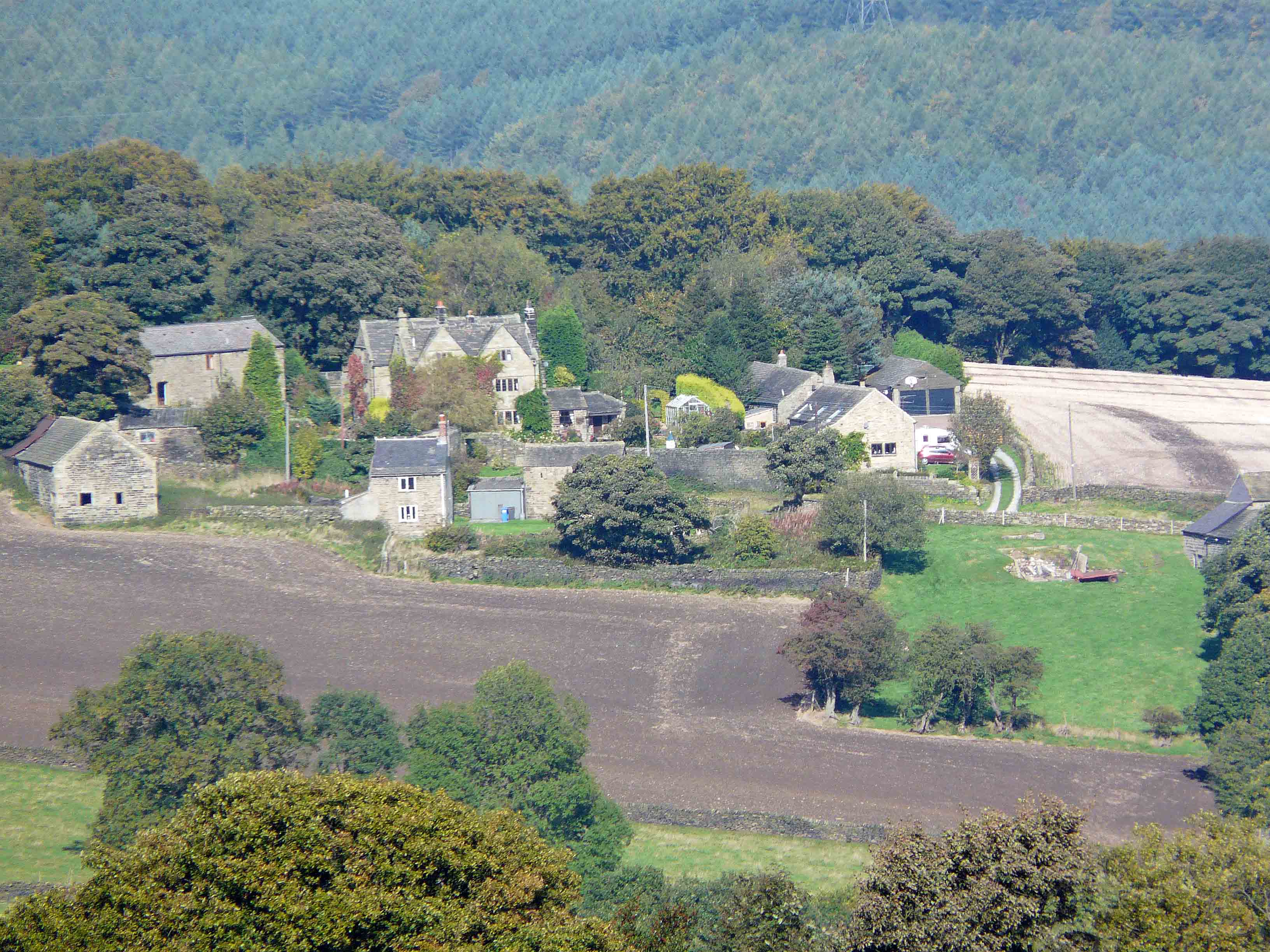
The hamlet of Onesacre stands 1 km west of Oughtibridge.

The little hamlet of Onesacre, approximately half a mile west of Oughtibridge, was mentioned in the Domesday Book of 1086. However, its history goes back to Anglo-Saxon times when it was part of the estate of the Saxon lord Godric. The Onesacre estate, then known as Anesacre, was owned by the Le Rous family after the Norman Conquest until around 1380, when it passed to the Stead family who were large land-owners in the Sheffield and Hallamshire area. The present buildings date from the middle of the 17th century and Onesacre Hall is Grade II* listed.

=== Industrial development ===
Oughtibridge remained a small isolated rural hamlet over the centuries and even by 1747 it was made up of only five families. However, the population started to rise in the latter part of the 18th century as a result of the Industrial Revolution and a further expansion in farming. Oughtibridge's position within the Don valley made it a prime location as the water power of the river could be used to drive the machinery of the early and mid-19th century.

In 1841 the population had risen to 1,005 with Oughtibridge forge being the main industry in the village. The forge still stands today on Forge Lane and is a Grade-II-listed building; it has been renovated in recent years and turned into several apartments within a new housing development. There was a corn mill, paper mill, tannery and a small brewery among the other industries at this time. During the second half of the 19th century Oughtibridge reached its height as an industrial centre with the opening of Oughty Bridge railway station in 1845 on the Sheffield, Ashton-under-Lyne and Manchester Railway. By 1891 the population had grown to 1,784.

The Oughtibridge Silica Firebrick Company which had ganister mines in the nearby Beeley Wood and Wharncliffe Woods, utilised the railway for transportation, building a factory by the railway line near the station; the works were taken over by the Steetley company in 1947. The Steetley refractory works on Station Lane closed in the 1980s with half the site being redeveloped for housing while the remaining half was taken over by Intermet Refractory Products Ltd.

==== Oughtibridge mill and site ====
The Dixon family bought the paper mill to the northwest of the village in 1871 and it became a flourishing business, being one of the first to use wood pulp to produce paper instead of rags. The mill specialised in tissues, making the Dixcel brand for many years. Wood pulp for Dixon's paper mill was imported from the Toppila pulp mill (Toppila Oy) in Oulu, Finland from 1931 to 1985. The Dixons signed an agreement with the railway company to provide a siding for the works to transport raw materials and the finished product. The factory had several owners after the Dixons sold the mill in the 1970s, namely British Tissues, Jamont UK, The Fort James Corporation and from 2000 it became part of the Georgia-Pacific group. The paper mill was closed in 2007 leaving only converting lines operational with the two tissue machines being mothballed. All production ceasing in 2015.

On 30 August 2016 a resolution to grant outline planning for up to 320 homes was secured for the Oughtibridge mill site. This includes the demolition of existing industrial buildings and the construction of a residential development. A new vehicular bridge and a pedestrian / cycle bridge will be built across the River Don to give access to the site. The plans include associated landscaping and infrastructure works.

== Present day ==
The modern-day development of Oughtibridge has seen it become a commuter village with many of the residents working in nearby Sheffield and much of the local industry having given way to private housing development. There are approximately 1,355 housing units in Oughtibridge, 79% of which are owner occupied; there is a significantly lower percentage of rented properties compared to the rest of Sheffield.

Land and new residential dwellings at Oughtibridge east of the River Don, are within the Metropolitan Borough of Barnsley, and the Parish of Wortley.

The River Don in this area is a historic boundary betwixt the ancient Wapentake of Staincross and Wapentake of Strafforth & Tickhill, and the Tankersley/Wortley and Bradfield parishes, In more modern times the Boroughs of Sheffield and Barnsley.

The A6102 road, one of the main transport exits from the northwest of Sheffield towards Stocksbridge and eventually Manchester, goes through Oughtibridge splitting into a one way system in its passage through the village. There are good public transport links to Sheffield by bus including a link to the Sheffield Supertram network at Middlewood. There are five public houses within Oughtibridge (The Pheasant, The Cock Inn, The Travellers, The Hare and Hounds and The White Hart). The White Hart is once more a public house after being a bridal shop. Oughtibridge primary school is situated on Naylor Road; secondary school pupils have to travel to Bradfield School in the nearby village of Worrall.

The Parish Church of the Ascension on Church Street was built in 1842. It has a two manual organ by Nelson - unusually the great organ has tracker action but the swell pneumatic. It underwent cleaning and partial reconstruction in 2012. The great has a fine if not loud open diapason. Originally part of the Wadsley parish, Oughtibridge is now a separate parish although the vicar of Wadsley still appoints the vicar at Oughtibridge. Coronation Park is situated in the centre of the village by the river and includes a children's playground and tennis courts as well as some fine specimens of trees. Sheffield Canoe Club use the river by the park as their outdoor base. Just across the road from the park is the hall of the Oughtibridge Brass Band who were formed around 1890. The War Memorial sports ground is situated next to the River Don slightly downstream, providing facilities for the village football and cricket teams. The ground was donated by the Silica Firebrick Company in 1921.

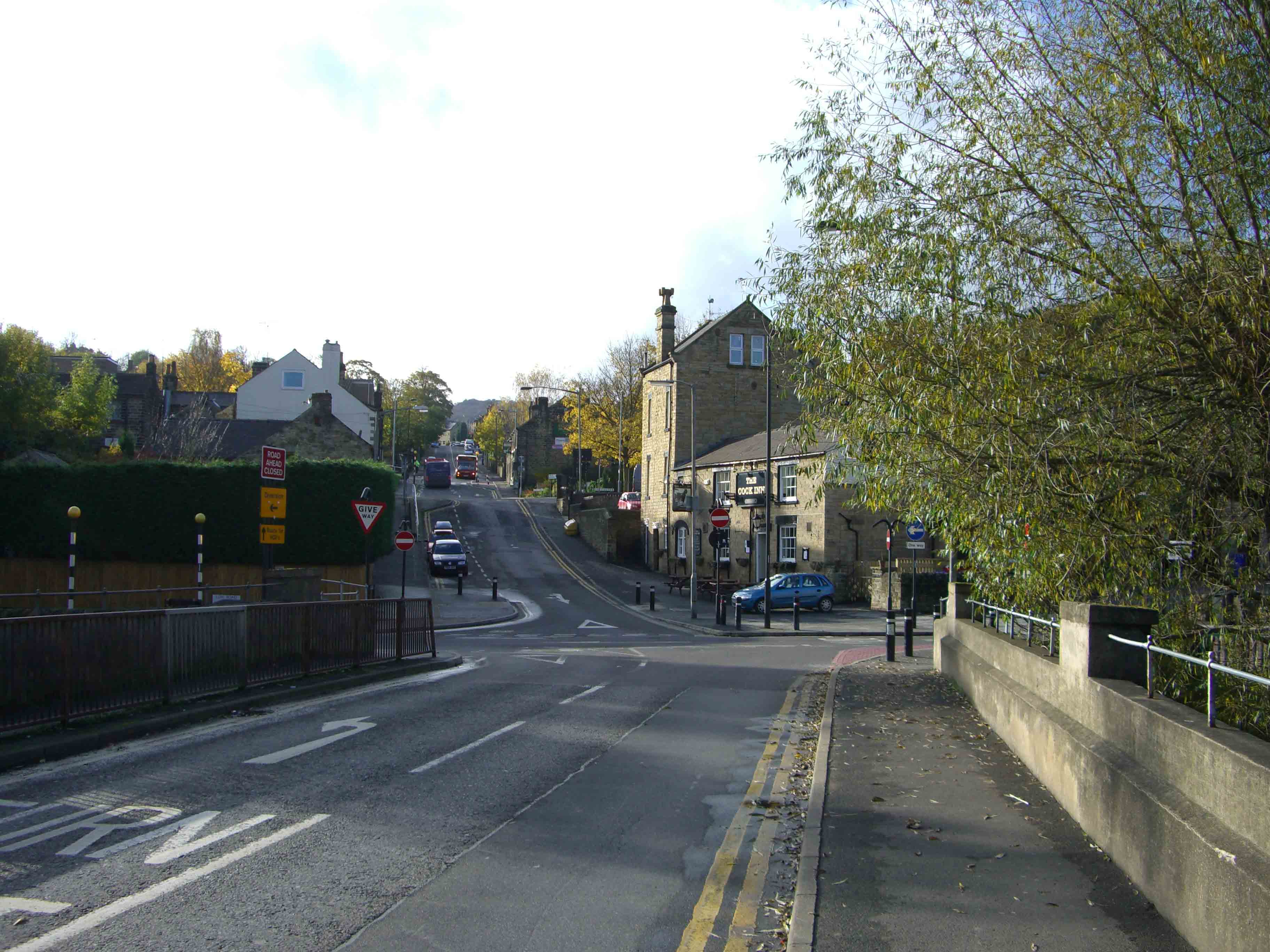
The centre of Oughtibridge

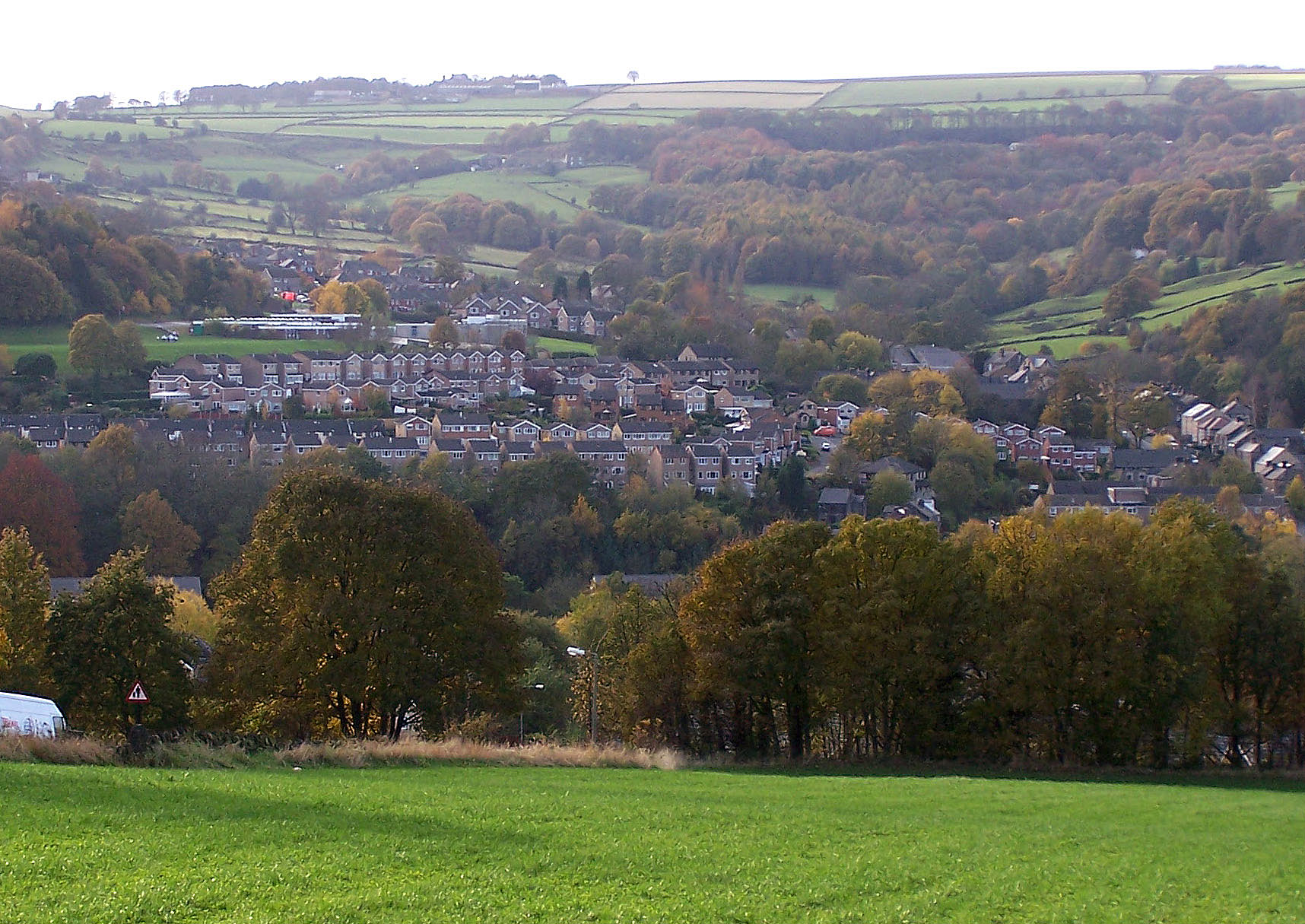
Oughtibridge from the east, from a height of 140 metres

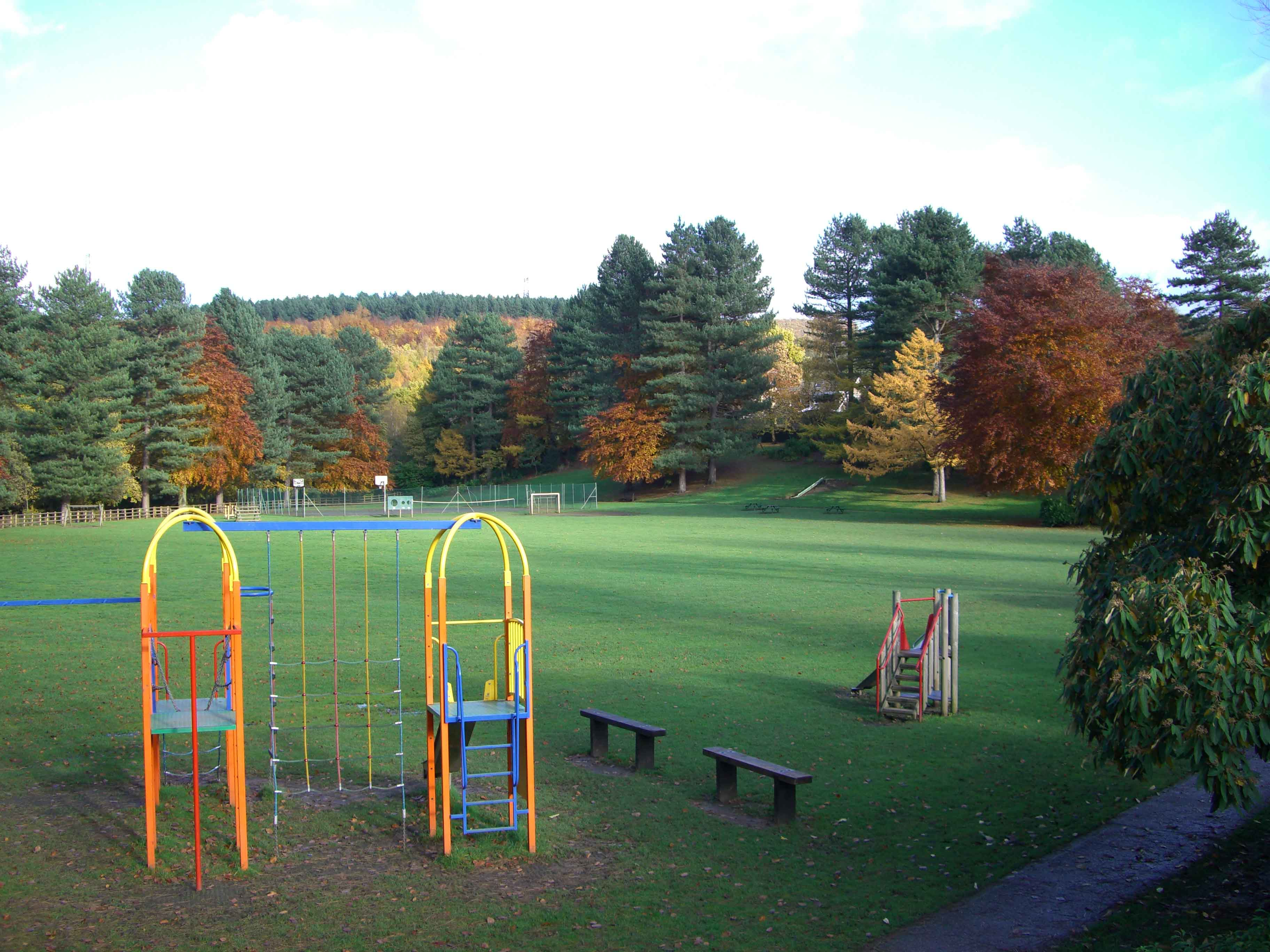
Coronation Park

== Notable people ==
- Dominic Barrow (b. 1993), professional rugby union player for Sale Sharks
- Miriam Cates (b. 1982), former Conservative MP for Penistone and Stockbridge
- Arnold Minnis (1891–1972), first-class cricketer and British Army officer
- Craig Pawson (b. 2 March 1979), Premier League referee
