= Ecclesfield Feoffees =

Trustees for Ecclesfield in South Yorkshire, England

The Feoffees of Ecclesfield was originally created in 1574. The word "Feoffees" translates into modern language as the word "Trustees" and that is in effect what the Feoffees are. Ecclesfield is a village on the northern perimeter of the City of Sheffield in Yorkshire. When originally created, the Feoffees were much more than trustees. Land and properties were donated by a wealthy landowner and the trustees were in effect the "Elders and Rulers" of the village of Ecclesfield and several surrounding villages. The key responsibilities were the following:

- Maintenance of Divine Service in the Parish Church of Eglesfield (Ecclesfield)
- Relief of the poor in the parish
- Repairs to the church and its ornaments
- Amending of highways in the parish

The original 1574 deed was regularised in 1617 and the equivalent of a modern trust deed was created. In practice, the Feoffees were for a period of time responsible for law, order, punishment and maintenance of the streets as well as one of the main sources of funding for the village. The parish of Ecclesfield in 1574 amounted to 78 square miles (200 km^{2}) and was bounded to the north by Penistone, to the east by Sheffield and Rotherham, on the south by the boundary between Yorkshire and Derbyshire and on the west, it came within 1-mile (1.6 km) of Cheshire. One of the largest parishes in England.

Until the 1950s, the Feoffees main income was through rents collected from and land and buildings. The last property was sold in the 1970s and income is now from the interest from invested capital although the trust secretary still retains the title "collector". The Feoffees of Ecclesfield continue to exist and are a Registered Charity reference 222979, and carry out the duties, largely as set down way back in 1574 although maintenance of roads passed to the local authority long ago. The Feoffees Trust receives monies from wills and donations and from anyone wanting to help and improve Ecclesfield village. Currently, grants are made from time to time for the poor and needy in Ecclesfield and also to Ecclesfield Parish Church. Other requests, within the scope of the charity, are considered. Current trustees are:- Andrew Robinson (Chairman), Jonathan Robinson (Treasurer), Philip Jeffcock (Collector/Secretary), Sir William Jeffcock, Revd. Dr. Tim Gill, David Hawley, Philip Hirst, Mrs. Andrea Whittaker. David Fairchild.
