= Arnold Minnis =

English cricketer and British Army officer

Personal information
- Full name: Arnold Minnis
- Born: 26 October 1891; Oughtibridge, Yorkshire, England
- Died: 26 September 1972 (aged 80); Cirencester, Gloucestershire, England
- Batting: Right-handed
- Bowling: Slow left-arm orthodox

Career statistics
Competition	First-class
Matches	4
Runs scored	10
Batting average	3.33
100s/50s	–/–
Top score	5*
Balls bowled	917
Wickets	23
Bowling average	15.13
5 wickets in innings	1
10 wickets in match	–
Best bowling	7/48
Catches/stumpings	–/–
- Source: Cricinfo, 15 April 2019

Brigadier Arnold Minnis, CBE (26 October 1891 – 26 September 1972) was an English first-class cricketer and British Army officer. Minnis' military career with the Royal Engineers spanned from 1915–1946, during which he served in both world wars. He rose to the rank of brigadier and was appointed a Commander of the Order of the British Empire in 1941. He also played first-class cricket for the British Army cricket team.

== Early military career ==
Minnis was born at Oughtibridge and attended the Royal Military Academy, Woolwich. He graduated from Woolwich in October 1915, entering into the Royal Engineers (West Riding Divisional Engineers) as a second lieutenant. Serving in the First World War, he was promoted to the rank of lieutenant in July 1917. In December 1918, he was promoted to the temporary rank of captain while commanding a company when seconded to the Military Works Office. He was appointed to the Royal School of Military Engineering in July 1925, as an assistant instructor in construction. He was promoted to the full rank of captain in August 1926. He relinquished his position at the school in October 1929.

Minnis made his debut in first-class cricket for the British Army cricket team against the Marylebone Cricket Club (MCC) at Lord's in 1930. He played in the repeat fixture at Lord's the following season, taking figures of 7 for 48 with his slow left-arm orthodox bowling, helping to dismiss the MCC for 97 in their first-innings. He made two further first-class appearances for the army in 1932, against the touring South Americans and the Royal Air Force. In four first-class matches, Minnis took a total of 23 wickets at an average of 15.13.

== Later military career and Second World War ==
In January 1932, Minnis was appointed as a staff captain at the War Office, while the following year he became the deputy assistant director of works at the War Office. He was promoted to the rank of major in October 1935. He relinquished his position as deputy assistant director of works in January 1936. He was granted the temporary rank of lieutenant colonel in December 1937, while commanding the Royal Engineers at Corsham. Having gained the full rank of lieutenant colonel in January 1938, he was promoted to the rank of battalion colonel in July 1939.

Minnis served during the Second World War, where he commanded "X" Force, a formation of ten territorial field companies constructing defences on the French-Belgian frontier as a continuation north of the Maginot Line prior to the German invasion of France in May 1940. He was mentioned in despatches in December 1940. He was appointed a Commander of the Order of the British Empire in March 1941, while in May of the same year he was promoted to the rank of colonel. He was again mentioned in despatches in December 1941 and August 1943, the latter for service in Iraq and Persia. After the conclusion of the war he was retained on the active list, before retiring in July 1946, at which point he was granted the honorary rank of brigadier. He was made the honorary colonel of the 118 Construction Regiment in October 1947, a role he undertook until his resignation in May 1949. He died at Cirencester in September 1972.
