= Middlewood, South Yorkshire =

Suburb of Sheffield, South Yorkshire, England

Coordinates: 53.42°N 1.52°W

Middlewood
- Location within South Yorkshire
- Population: 4,549 (2001)
- OS grid reference: SK316916
- Civil parish: Bradfield; part unparished
- Metropolitan borough: Sheffield
- Metropolitan county: South Yorkshire
- Region: Yorkshire and the Humber
- Country: England
- Sovereign state: United Kingdom
- Post town: SHEFFIELD
- Postcode district: S6
- Dialling code: 0114
- Police: South Yorkshire
- Fire: South Yorkshire
- Ambulance: Yorkshire
- UK Parliament: Sheffield Hallam Sheffield Brightside and Hillsborough

Middlewood is a north western suburb of Sheffield, South Yorkshire, England. The suburb falls within the Stannington ward of the City.

== Location ==
Middlewood was formerly an entirely rural location, it has been partly encroached on by the expansion of the city of Sheffield since the 1960s. The exact area of the Middlewood district is not easy to determine, but is popularly thought to extend from the "Middlewood shops" at the top of Leppings Lane northwest for three km along the A6102 past Middlewood Hall to the outskirts of Oughtibridge. Between those two points it includes the land on the south western side of the River Don up to Worrall Road.

== History ==
=== Middlewood Hall ===
Middlewood Hall (grid reference SK312923) is set in 54 acres (220,000 m^{2}) and was constructed in 1810 by Mark Skelton, however a farmhouse is believed to have existed on the site well before that. The Skeltons were a family of steel forgers and merchants who owned forges on the River Don. The 1911 census records show that the Hall was occupied by the Thorp family and their servants. In 1926 the house was sold to the Wilson family (local snuff makers) and then in 1980 to Wharncliffe Construction who turned it into a luxury hotel. However the Hall lies on green belt land and further expansion was not possible. After changing hands twice more as a hotel, it was purchased by a private individual in 1999 who converted it back into a private family dwelling. The hall is a grade two listed building.

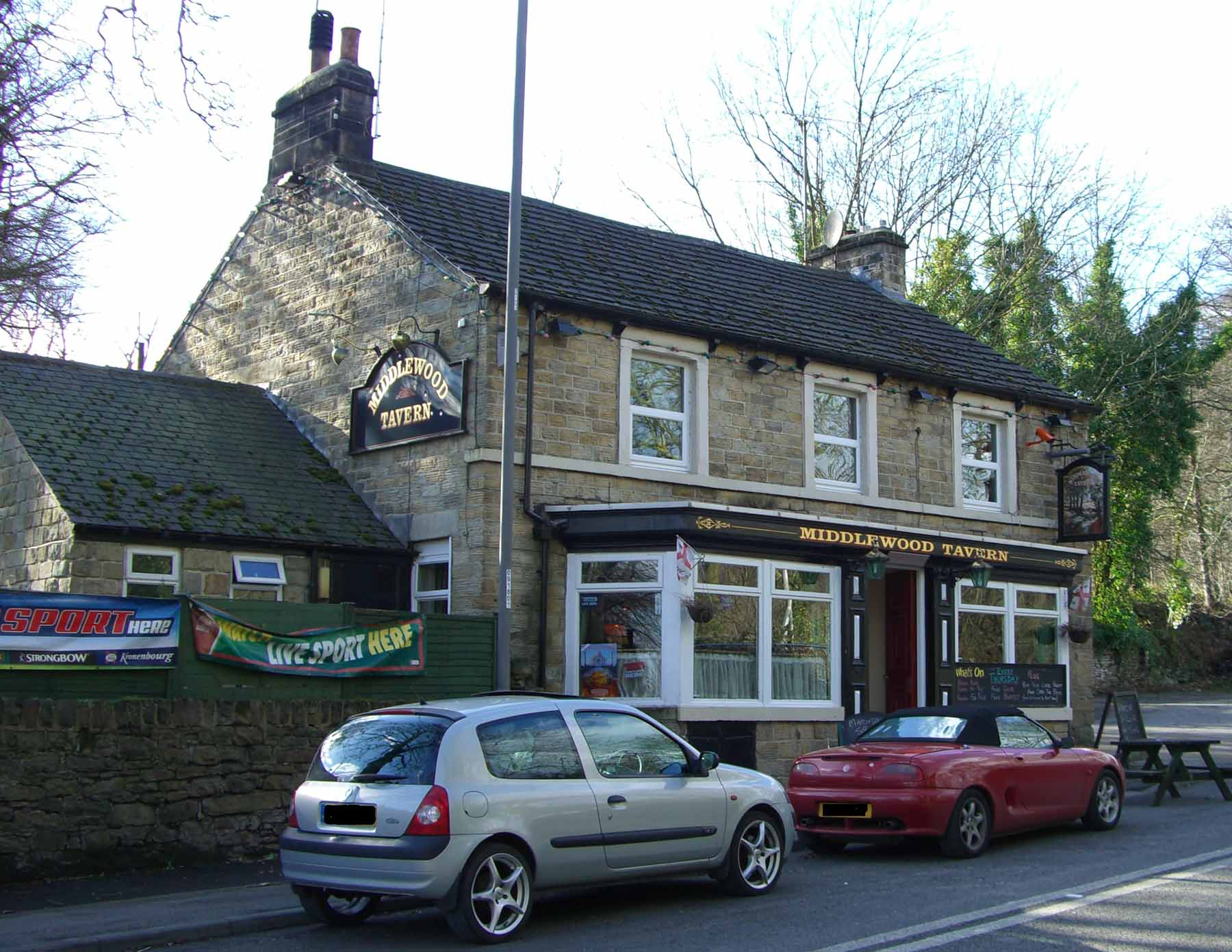
The Middlewood Tavern dates back to at least the middle of the 19th century.

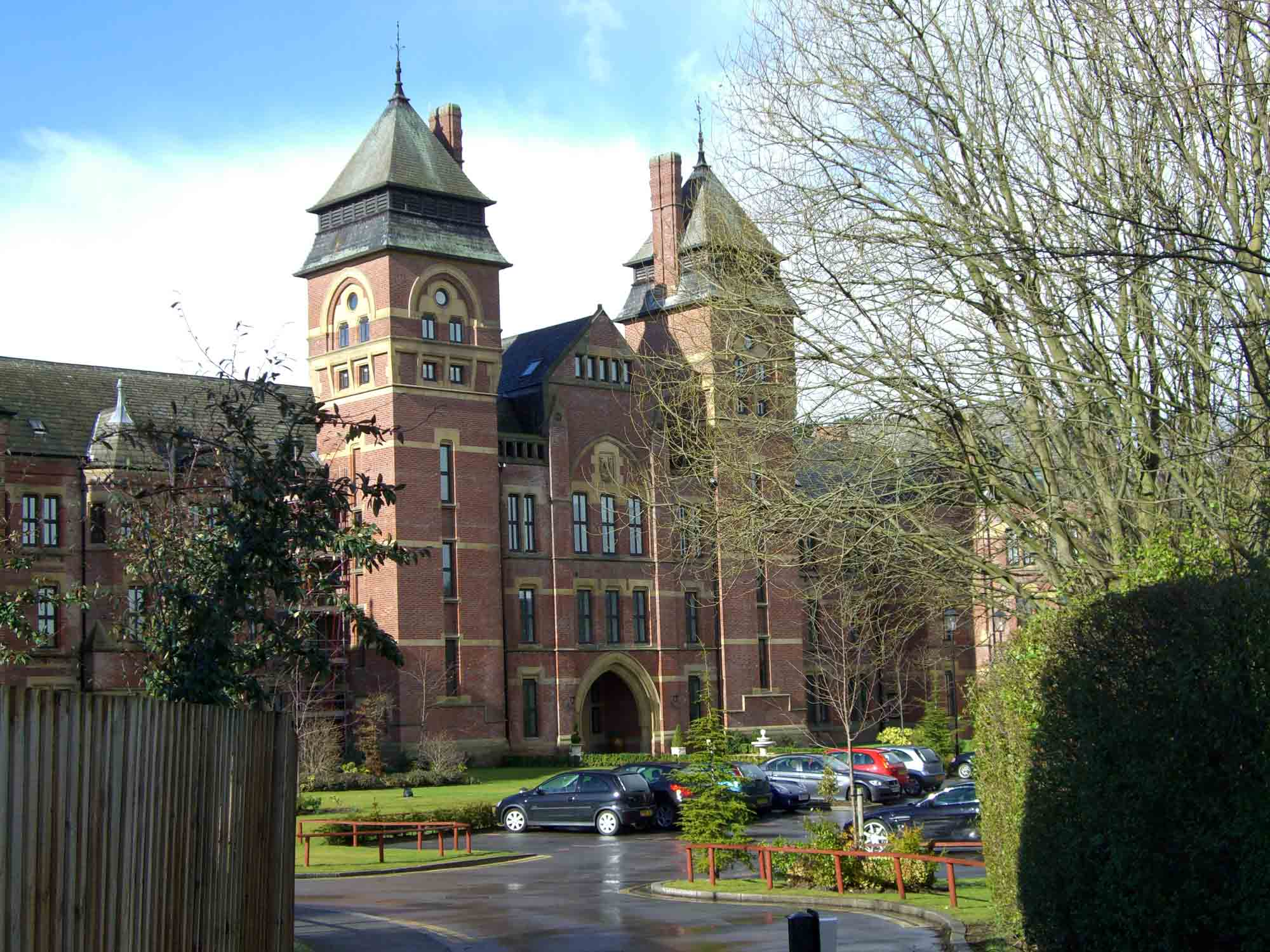
The former Kingswood ward at the old Middlewood hospital has been redeveloped into a tenement block.

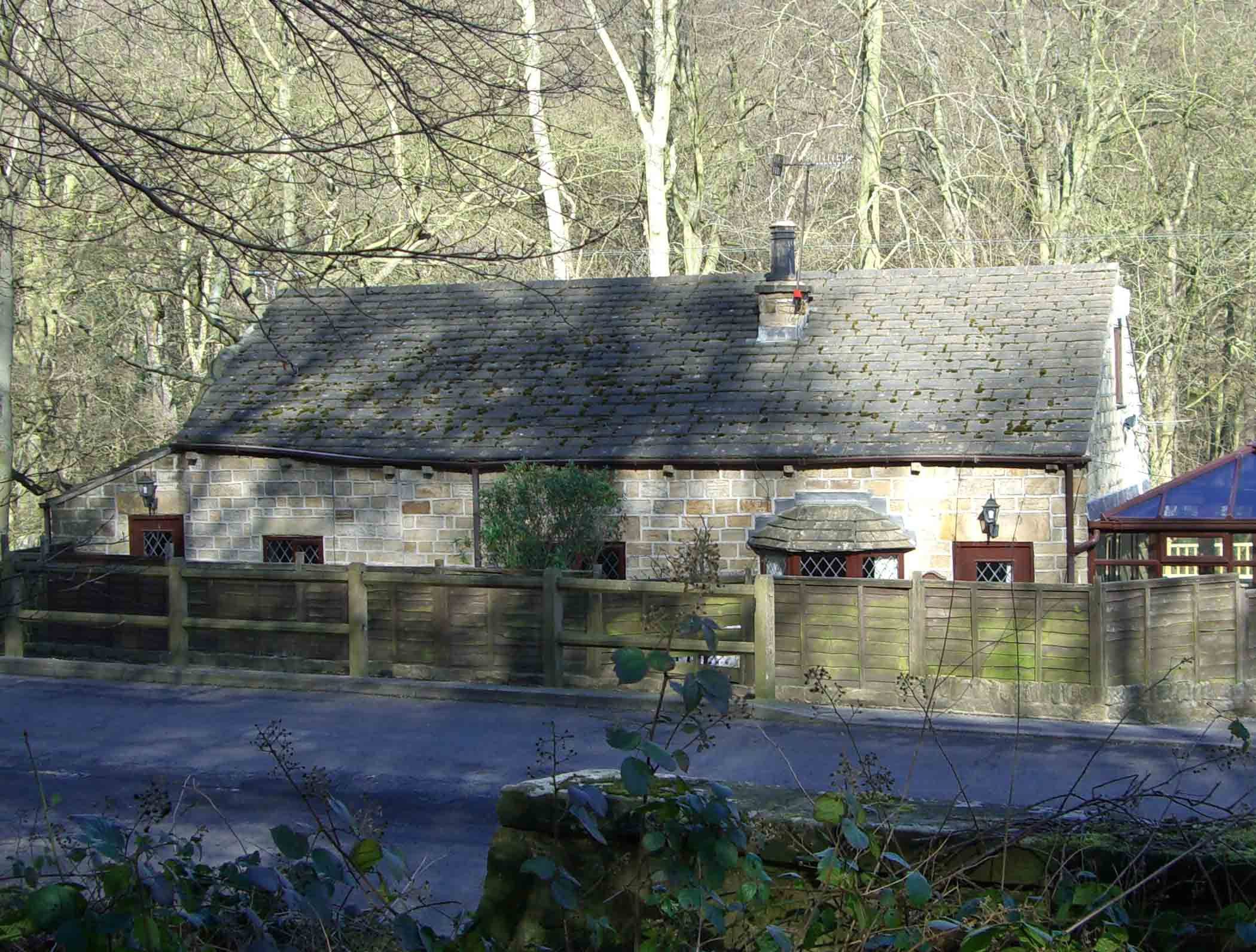
Toll Bar Cottage is now a private dwelling.

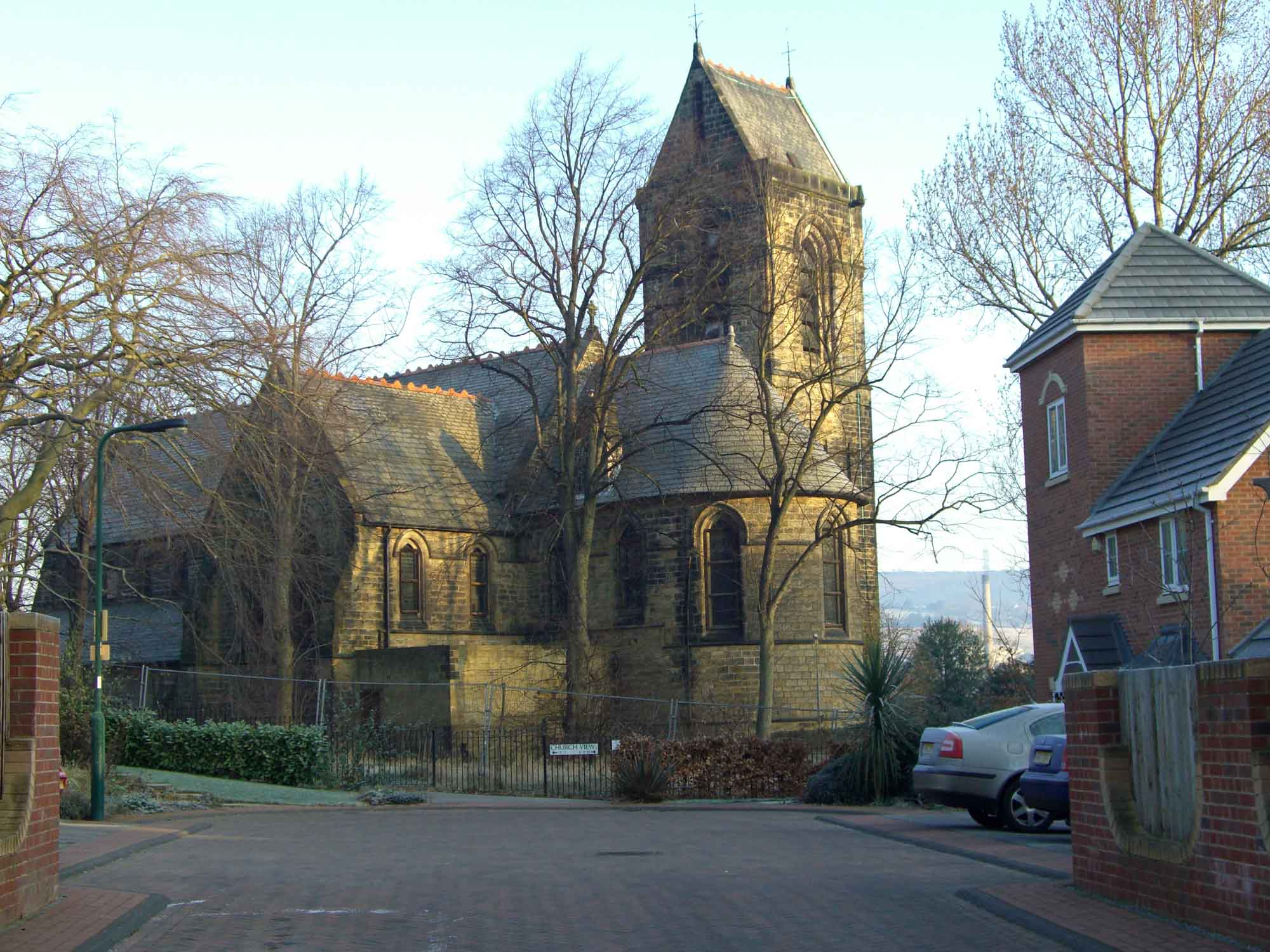
Middlewood church, closed and unused, stands within the new Wadsley Park estate.

=== Middlewood and Wharncliffe Hospitals ===
Both hospitals were on the same site and were built and fitted out at a total cost of £150,000. Wharncliffe was a small medical hospital while Middlewood was a large psychiatric hospital. Middlewood was opened on 21 August 1872 on a large rural site (approx SK320913). It was originally known as the South Yorkshire Asylum until 1890, then became the West Riding Asylum, Wadsley (1890–1930). It was known as Wadsley Mental Hospital between 1930 and 1948 when it became Middlewood Hospital. Not all of the original inmates were psychiatric patients, some were paupers from the workhouse, some were females suffering postnatal depression and some were suffering from epilepsy.

Insulin shock therapy was introduced at the hospital in 1935 for the treatment of schizophrenia. The hospital was evacuated during both World wars and used as a war hospital. The hospital had a working farm operated by the residents until the early 1960s and also its own church. Changes in mental health care meant that the hospital was scaled down and then closed in 1998. The site was bulldozed and is now a private housing development called Wadsley Park Village.

=== Other historical buildings ===
Middlewood Tavern is a public house which has documented history going back to 1835 when Joseph Bowden applied for a licence to sell liquors on the premises. It was, and still is partly, in a secluded situation on Middlewood Road North (A6102) surrounded by a few houses and formerly relied on trade from staff at Middlewood Hospital. Rocher bridge (footbridge) crosses the River Don at the Tavern and gives access to Beeley Wood. After the Sheffield flood of 2007, leading to the collapse of the road towards Oughtibridge, access was severely restricted and the Middlewood Tavern lost trade and subsequently never recovered and closed soon after.

Toll Bar Cottage is also situated on Middlewood Road North, just before it reaches Oughtibridge. The keeper collected tolls on the Wadsley, Langsett, Sheffield Turnpike road which opened in 1805. The road became toll free in 1875; the cottage is a private dwelling today. Middlewood Grange is a Victorian detached house in 4 acres (16,000 m^{2}) which is set just behind the Tavern.

== Present day ==
=== Housing developments ===
The Winn Gardens estate, a council housing scheme was built in the mid 1960s on land (grid reference SK325914) which formerly belonged to Middlewood Hospital and was used as the farm and allotments and grew all the hospital's fresh produce. Middlewood Park stands at the NW end of the estate. Most of the housing around the lower end of Stockarth Lane, just before the tavern, dates from the second half of the 19th century, although there were some newer houses built in the early 1980s.

As mentioned, the Wadsley Park Village private housing scheme was built on the former site of Middlewood Hospital between 2001 and 2006. Certain parts of the old hospital such as the church, lodge and Kingswood ward are listed buildings and cannot be demolished; they have been incorporated and left within the new estate. Kingswood has been converted into luxury flats and the lodge has been included in a new nursery building. The church has stood boarded up and derelict for many years but in March 2012 plans were submitted by architectural design consultancy Coda Studios that will see the imposing Victorian church converted into a mixture of town houses and apartments. The scheme which needs approval from Sheffield City Council also contains proposals for a selection of partially underground eco-friendly bungalows beneath the building.

The village has a SSSI within it, created in 1990, it is the site of the Wadsley Fossil Forest, it “contains a number of in situ fossil tree stumps, two of which have been exposed for many years. They are considered to be the best preserved example in the British Isles of trees which were part of the extensive coal forming swamp forests growing some 300 million years ago”.

=== Facilities ===
Many important facilities for the district are located just outside the immediate Middlewood area. There are no large supermarkets and only a limited number of small shops within the district and most residents will commute to nearby Hillsborough to do their larger shopping needs. There is a small shopping area at the top of Leppings Lane known as the Middlewood shops. This contains a large concentration of take-away food shops although there is a medium-sized Asda supermarket located within the old Hillsborough Park cinema building on Catch Bar Lane. The cinema building dates from 1921 and ceased being a cinema in 1967, since then it has been a bingo hall and then a supermarket operated by Supasave, then Netto before Asda took over in August 2011.

The nearest primary schools are in Wadsley and Hillsborough, while the Hillsborough Leisure Centre just to the SE is the closest community sports facility. The Sheffield Wednesday training ground is situated on Middlewood Road, this is a private facility for use by the football club only, it was originally constructed in the late 1960s on old allotments it has undergone extensive redevelopment in recent years. As well as outdoor pitches the facility includes a 66 metre by 45 metre air dome which houses a synthetic pitch for indoor training, the dome is a notable sight in the area.

Late 2005 saw the opening of the Fairlawns Medical Centre and Polyclinic on Middlewood Road North (SK322915) to give the area extra medical facilities due to the increased population brought by the Wadsley Park Village development. The medical centre includes at present, a GP practice offering a full service from doctors, practice nurses and health care assistants, a dental practice, pharmacy and various primary care trust outpatient services such as physiotherapy, chronic fatigue, lymphoedema, mental health. The Yorkshire Ambulance Service has an ambulance station adjoining the medical centre.

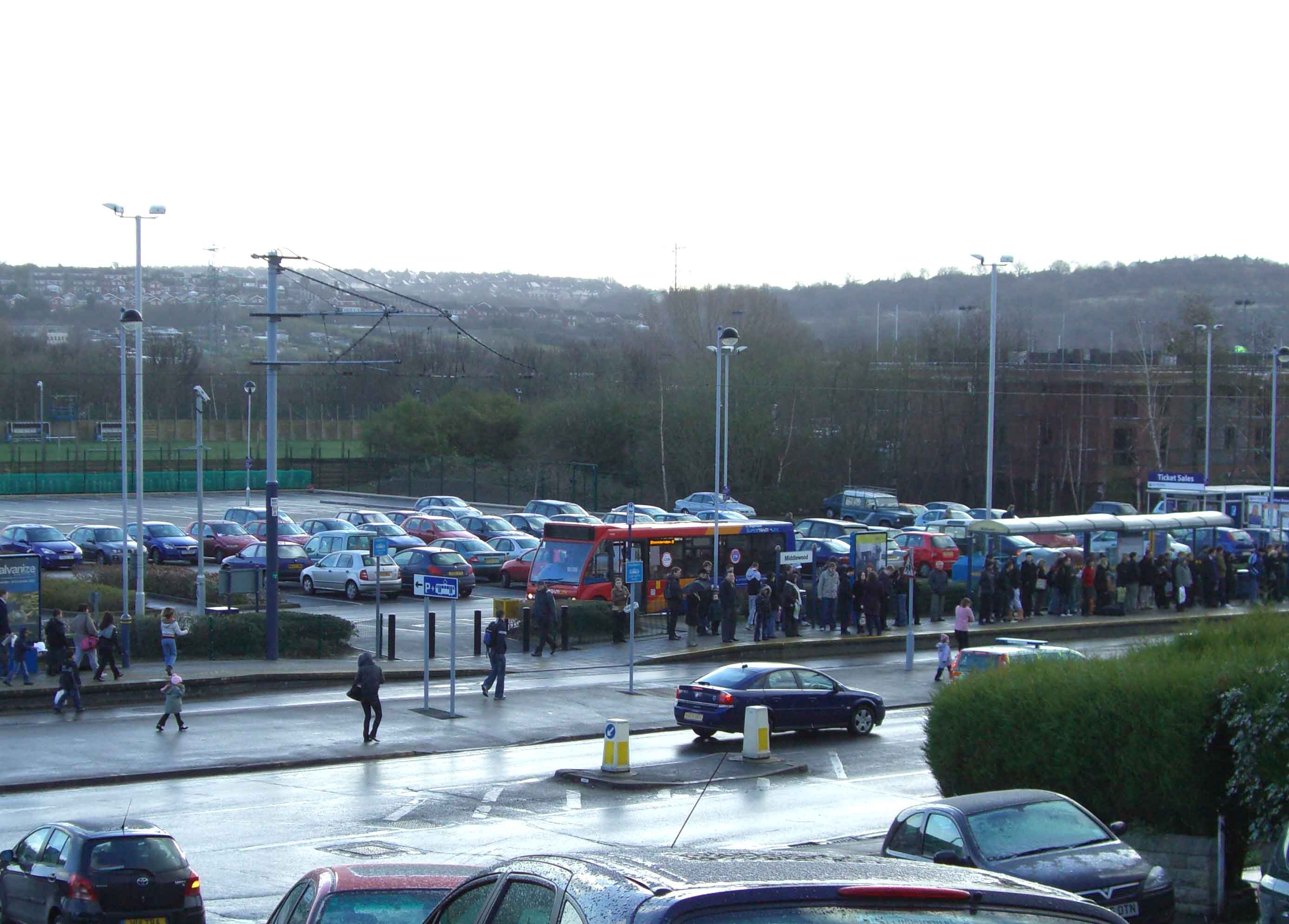
The Middlewood Supertram terminus with the park and ride behind at the busy morning period.

=== Supertram terminus ===
Middlewood tram stop was constructed as the northern terminus of South Yorkshire Supertram and opened in October 1995. The terminus is an off-road single platform type and was built on old allotment land at grid reference SK326911 on Middlewood Road. There is a park and ride facility, originally with 200 parking spaces, it was enlarged to 350 spaces in October 2007. The system formerly incorporated a SupertramLink bus service which connected to Stocksbridge, Deepcar, Wharncliffe Side and Oughtibridge, however this service was permanently withdrawn in 2022. The park and ride is well used by commuters from these areas.

Preceding station	Sheffield Supertram	Following station
Leppings Lane towards Meadowhall Interchange	Yellow Line	Terminus

=== 2007 Floods ===
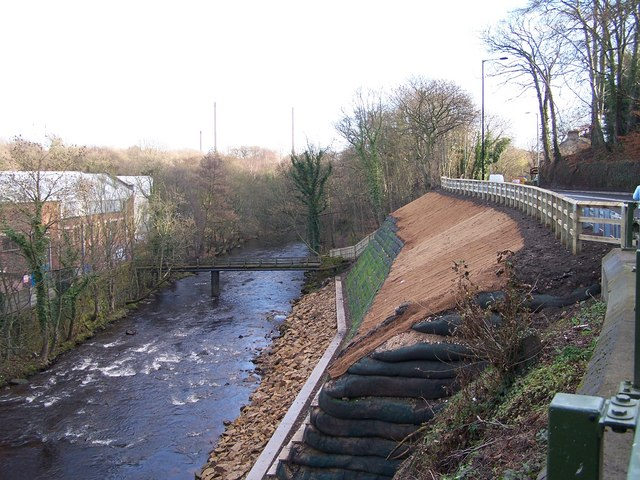
Riverbank Repairs on the A6102 near Middlewood Tavern

The Middlewood area of Sheffield was badly hit by the June 2007 floods. The lower part of the Winn Gardens estate was inundated by the River Don which flows at the bottom of the estate. 200 residents had to be evacuated and given shelter at two nearby schools. A section of the A6102 road just past the Middlewood Tavern collapsed when the raised embankment was partly washed away. The road was closed for 17 months before finally re-opening in December 2008.
