= West Ecclesfield =

Electoral ward in the City of Sheffield, South Yorkshire, England

Coordinates: 53°26′17″N 1°29′31″W

- Shown within Sheffield
- Area: 4.83 sq mi (12.5 km^{2})
- Population: 17,699
  - Density: 3,664/sq mi (1,415/km^{2})
- Metropolitan borough: City of Sheffield
- Metropolitan county: South Yorkshire
- Region: Yorkshire and the Humber
- Country: England
- Sovereign state: United Kingdom
- UK Parliament: Penistone and Stocksbridge
- Councillors: Ann Whitaker (Liberal Democrats); Alan Hooper (Liberal Democrats); Mike Levery (Liberal Democrats)

West Ecclesfield ward—which includes the districts of Burncross, Grenoside, High Green—is one of the 28 electoral wards in City of Sheffield, England. It is located in the northern part of the city and covers an area of 4.83 square miles (3,090 acres; 12.5 km^{2}) in the western part of Ecclesfield Parish. The population of this ward in 2024 was 17,480 people. West Ecclesfield was one of the six wards that made up the former Sheffield Hillsborough Parliamentary constituency. In their final report, the Boundary Commission for England recommended that West Ecclesfield form part of a reformed Penistone Parliamentary constituency. West Ecclesfield is composed of a six polling districts: Angram Bank, Burncross, Grenoside one and two, Mortomley and Wortley Road.

== Districts in West Ecclesfield ward ==
=== Burncross ===
Burncross (grid reference SK345961) is in the north of the ward west of Chapeltown. It is a mostly residential area, which includes the Grade II listed Barnes Hall, rebuilt in 1824.

=== Grenoside ===
Grenoside (grid reference SK340938) is isolated from the other two districts in the south of the ward. It is at a closer proximity to Parson Cross.

=== High Green ===
High Green (grid reference SK340972) is north-west of Burncross. It is the most northerly suburb of Sheffield.
