= Jonathan Eastwood =

English clergyman and topographer

Jonathan Eastwood (1823–1864) was an English clergyman and topographer.

== Life ==
He studied at St. John's College, Cambridge, where, after obtaining both classical and mathematical honours, he took the two degrees in arts in 1846 and 1849 respectively. He entered holy orders in 1847, and was appointed curate of Ecclesfield, Yorkshire. He then exchanged his curacy for that of Eckington, Derbyshire.

He died at St. Leonards-on-Sea on 5 July 1864, aged 40, being at the time of his death incumbent of Hope, Staffordshire. He is buried in Hastings Cemetery, Plot AI K9. An obituary giving a good summary of his life and his accomplishments can be found on the Friends of Hastings Cemetery site.

He married a daughter of William Frederick Dixon of Page Hall, Ecclesfield, and left children.

== Works ==
He devoted his leisure to the study of local history and antiquity, and published the History of the Parish of Ecclesfield in the county of York, London, 1862.

To the Monthly Paper, a periodical for the use of Sunday schools, he contributed a series of papers under the title of ‘Notes on Scriptural and Liturgical Words.’ The words were treated of alphabetically and did not advance beyond the letter ‘H,’ but Eastwood proposed to complete the alphabet in collaboration with William Aldis Wright of Cambridge and to issue the whole in volume form. He finished his share of the work, but did not live to see its publication, which was deferred to 1866, when it appeared as the ‘Bible Word-book: a Glossary of Old English Bible Words.’ A second edition, revised throughout and greatly enlarged by Wright, was issued in 1881 without Eastwood's name. Eastwood was also a contributor to the English dictionary projected by the Philological Society.
