= Ecclesfield =

Village and civil parish in South Yorkshire, England

Coordinates: 53.4429°N 1.4698°W

- Village and civil parish
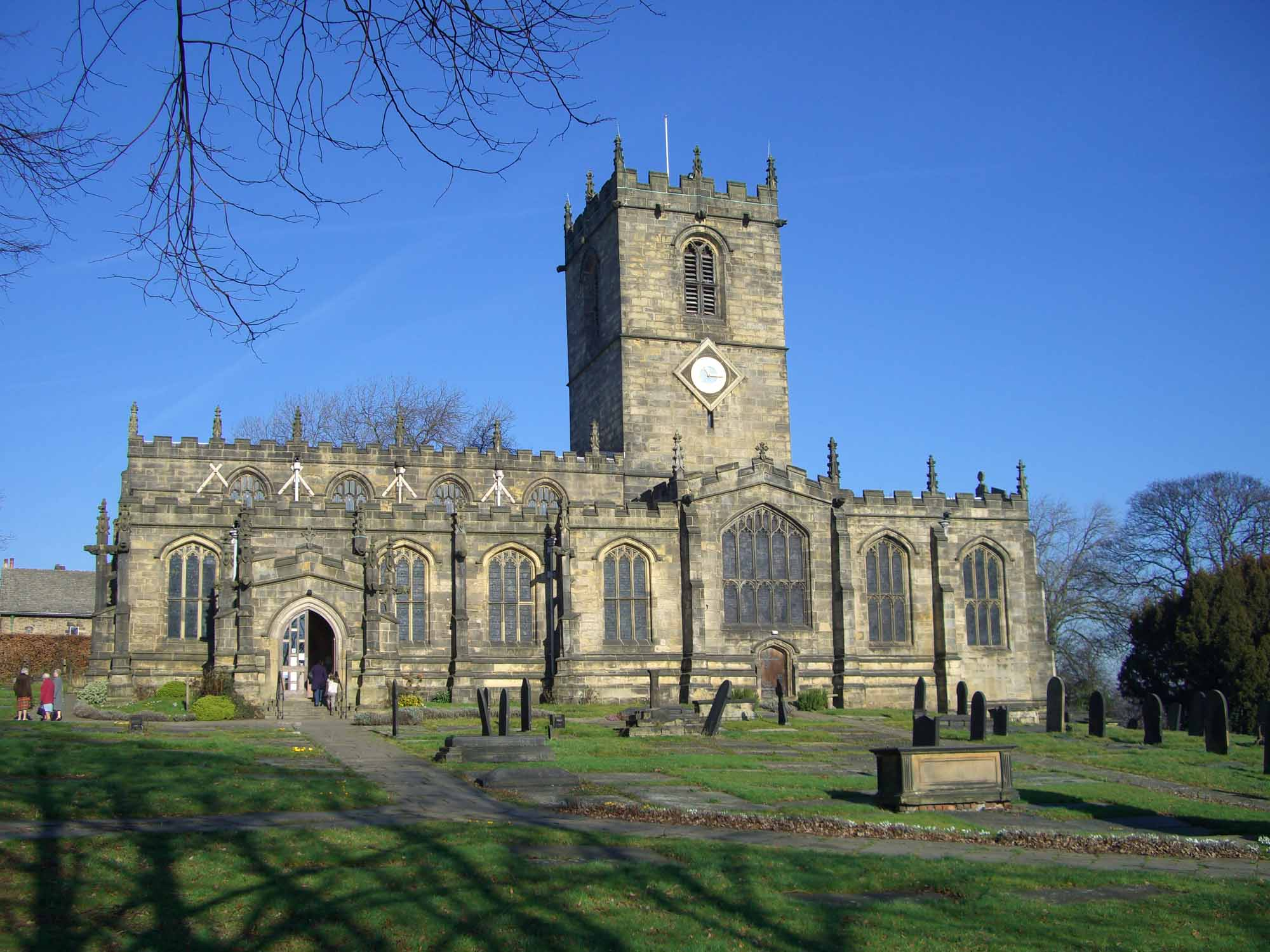

- Location within South Yorkshire
- Population: 32,073 (2011 Census)
- OS grid reference: SK 352 940
- Civil parish: Ecclesfield
- Metropolitan borough: Sheffield
- Metropolitan county: South Yorkshire
- Region: Yorkshire and the Humber
- Country: England
- Sovereign state: United Kingdom
- Post town: SHEFFIELD
- Postcode district: S5, S35
- Dialling code: 0114
- Police: South Yorkshire
- Fire: South Yorkshire
- Ambulance: Yorkshire
- UK Parliament: Penistone and Stocksbridge

Ecclesfield is a village and civil parish in the City of Sheffield, South Yorkshire, England, approximately 6 miles (9 km) north of Sheffield City Centre. Ecclesfield civil parish had a population of 32,073 at the 2011 Census. Ecclesfield wards of the City of Sheffield had a population of 35,994 in 2011 (Ecclesfield West and Ecclesfield East wards). The population of Ecclesfield village stood at 7,163 in the most recent census.

== History ==
Evidence of early settlement in the Ecclesfield area include remnants of Romano-British settlements and field systems in Greno Wood. The earliest known written record of Ecclesfield is from the Domesday Book of 1086, where it is referred to as "Eclesfeld". The meaning of the name is uncertain. Traditionally it has been derived from the Celtic egles, meaning a church, specifically a Romano-British one, and the Old English feld, meaning a woodland clearing. Thus the name could mean "Open land near a Romano-British Christian church". However, an alternative suggestion is that the first element eccles- derives from a Saxon personal name or an association with water.

The Domesday Book does not mention a church at Ecclesfield but does refer to Eclesfelt, which means "church in a clearing". It is believed that there was Christian worship on the site of the church since 500 and the site was possibly a worship site before then. The present Church of St Mary is the first stone built church in the village created in 1170–1200. The building was significantly re-built in 1470–1500 but incorporating the nave pillars and tower pillars from the 12th-century building. It is one of only five Grade I listed buildings in Sheffield, and as well as the pillars, incorporates other features from about 1200. It was the centre of the ancient parish of Ecclesfield, which was one of the most extensive in England before it was broken up in the 19th century. Its style is Perpendicular, with a central tower, and it formerly bore the title of the "Minster of the Moors."

The Benedictine Ecclesfield Priory was established in 1170–1180 and served as a cell of St Wandrille's Abbey in Normandy until the 14th century, when it passed to the Carthusians. It is a Grade II* listed building.

Ecclesfield had a paper mill in the 1800s.

During the First World War the Royal Flying Corps (RFC) established a Relief landing Ground just outside the eastern boundary of the village, on land that is now largely given over to an industrial estate, near to the current M1 motorway. 'A' flight of 33 Squadron used the site during 1916 as part of a Home Defence scheme to protect against Zeppelin raids, but as the threat of raids diminished the Ecclesfield landing site along with several others in the area was de-commissioned. No further flying has been recorded as having taken place.

Historically within the West Riding of Yorkshire, until April 1974 Ecclesfield was part of the Wortley Rural District. After 1974 the area north of the Hartley Brook belonging to the Wortley Rural District became part of the Sheffield City Council area. Two of the four Wortley Rural District parishes, Ecclesfield and Bradfield became part of the Sheffield Metropolitan Area, and two parishes, Wortley and Tankersley became part of the Barnsley Metropolitan Borough.

== Governance ==
The civil Parish of Ecclesfield includes Ecclesfield, Grenoside, Chapeltown, High Green, Burncross and Whitley. Government at parish level is in the hands of Ecclesfield Parish Council.

Since 1974 Ecclesfield Parish has been part of the City of Sheffield which is governed by Sheffield City Council.

Before 1974 the parish was part of Wortley Rural District in the West Riding of Yorkshire. Some southern parts of the parish had already been annexed to Sheffield City Council in 1968. The remainder of the parish was transferred to Sheffield in 1974, as part of local government reorganisation throughout England. The part to the east of the M1 motorway (mainly part of Thorpe Hesley) was subsequently transferred to Rotherham Metropolitan District in 1994 and no longer belongs to Ecclesfield Parish.

The civil parish includes the West Ecclesfield and most of the East Ecclesfield ward of Sheffield. These belong to the Penistone and Stocksbridge parliamentary constituency, whose member since the general election in 2024 is Marie Tidball.

== Amenities and setting ==
Ecclesfield lies in the north of Sheffield, about 4 miles (7 km) north of the city centre. The suburb of Ecclesfield is in the south-east of the civil parish with the suburbs Chapeltown and High Green to the north, and Grenoside to the west. Its altitude is 60 metres (200 ft) to 120 metres (390 ft) above mean sea level. At the 2001 census the civil parish—which also includes the Sheffield suburbs of Chapeltown, Grenoside, High Green, and formerly Thorpe Hesley (now a suburb of Rotherham)—had a population of 31,609.

Near Ecclesfield's old village is Whitley Hall, a 16th-century mansion property now converted into a four-star hotel and restaurant. It is a Grade II* listed building. Ecclesfield also has an old square, a cricket club, a large park, the Gatty Memorial Hall, a cemetery, various shops and other civic amenities. There are two schools, Ecclesfield Comprehensive School, previously Ecclesfield Grammar School, and Ecclesfield Primary School.

On the border of Ecclesfield Parish is Greno Wood, a forested area listed as Grade B on the English Nature Invertebrate Site Register, as of special archaeological and geological significance. The wood is managed by the Wildlife Trust for Sheffield and Rotherham.

== Demography ==
The population of Ecclesfield civil parish was recorded as 31,609 in the United Kingdom 2001 Census That of the suburb itself, which extends beyond the civil parish, was about 7,000. The ethnic mix was put at 98.3 per cent white (White British, White Irish, or White Other), 0.4 per cent Asian, 0.4 per cent Black British, 0.1 per cent Chinese, and 0.8 per cent mixed race. In 2011, Ecclesfield was described as being 96.1 per cent White British, 1.0 per cent Asian, 0.4 per cent White Irish, 0.5 per cent Other White and 0.7 per cent Black.

Table of the population change of the parish in 50-year periods since 1801:

| Year | 1801 | 1851 | 1901 | 1951 | 2001 |
| Population | 5,114 | 10,005 | 33,808 | 30,262 | 31,609 |
Source: A Vision of Britain through Time

The village of Ecclesfield is only a part of the Civil Parish and at the census in 2021 had a population of 7,163 people.

== Gradings ==
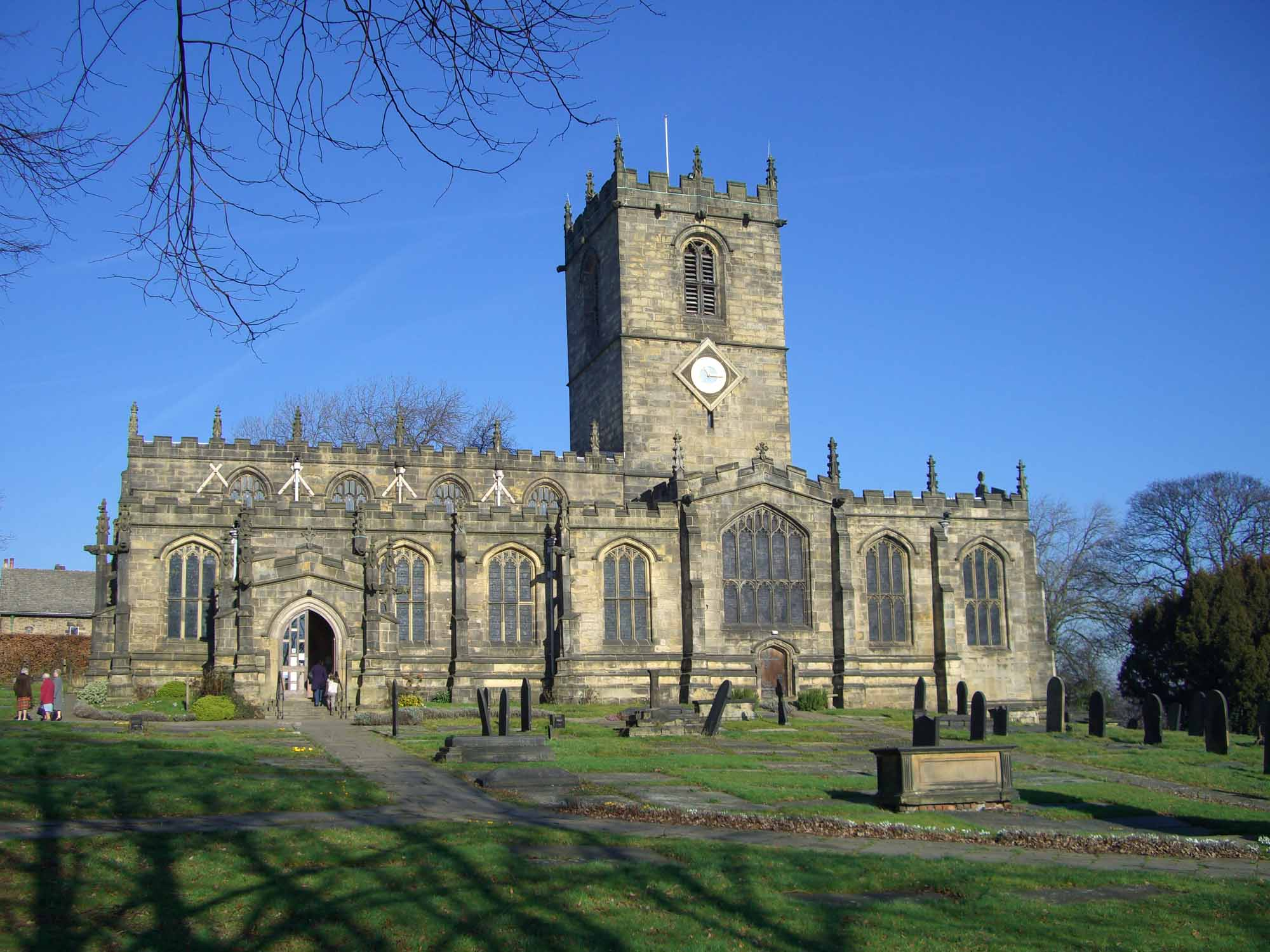
The Parish Church of St Mary, Ecclesfield

The Church of St. Mary is a Grade I listed building. It was once the church for the whole of Hallamshire, incorporating the parishes of Sheffield (now Sheffield cathedral) and Bradfield. The remains of Ecclesfield Priory and the Whitley Hall Hotel are Grade II* listed. Greno Wood is listed as Grade B on the English Nature Invertebrate Site Register, as being of special archaeological and geological significance.

== Transport ==
Street map of Ecclesfield village

The main road routes are the A61, running north–south, and the M1 motorway, skirting the eastern edge. Bus services by First South Yorkshire, Stagecoach Sheffield, Powells Bus Co. and TM Travel link with Sheffield City Centre, Barnsley, Rotherham, Meadowhall Centre and surrounding suburbs. Chapeltown railway station, in the Chapeltown suburb, connects with central Sheffield, Huddersfield and Leeds.

== Sport ==
Ecclesfield F.C. was a prominent football team in the area from the 1880s, and Ecclesfield United also represented the area in the FA Cup. Ecclesfield Red Rose FC now represents the area in the Sheffield & Hallamshire County Senior Football League. Whitley Hall Cricket Club plays at Cinder Hill Lane in Ecclesfield.

== The Ecclesfield Carols ==
Ecclesfield retains some local, traditional Christmas carols sung in villages, particularly pubs around Sheffield. They are older than today's generally known carols and differ from them. They can be heard at the Ecclesfield Black Bull and Greyhound on the six Thursdays before Christmas. The repertoire consists of around 30 carols and other songs, some unique to the village, some popular throughout the Sheffield area, some local variants, and some with familiar words to different tunes. (There is a vast number of tunes to "While Shepherds Watched".) They are often referred to collectively as the Local Carols.

== See also ==
- Ecclesfield Feoffees, a Trust created in 1574
- Alexander John Scott (1768–1840), naval chaplain, was buried in Ecclesfield.
- Juliana Horatia Ewing (1841–1885), children's writer, was born in Ecclesfield.
- Stanley Royle (1888–1961), artist, spent his childhood in Ecclesfield and depicted the Church of St Mary in one of his paintings.
