= Ecclesfield Priory =

Former monastery in South Yorkshire, England

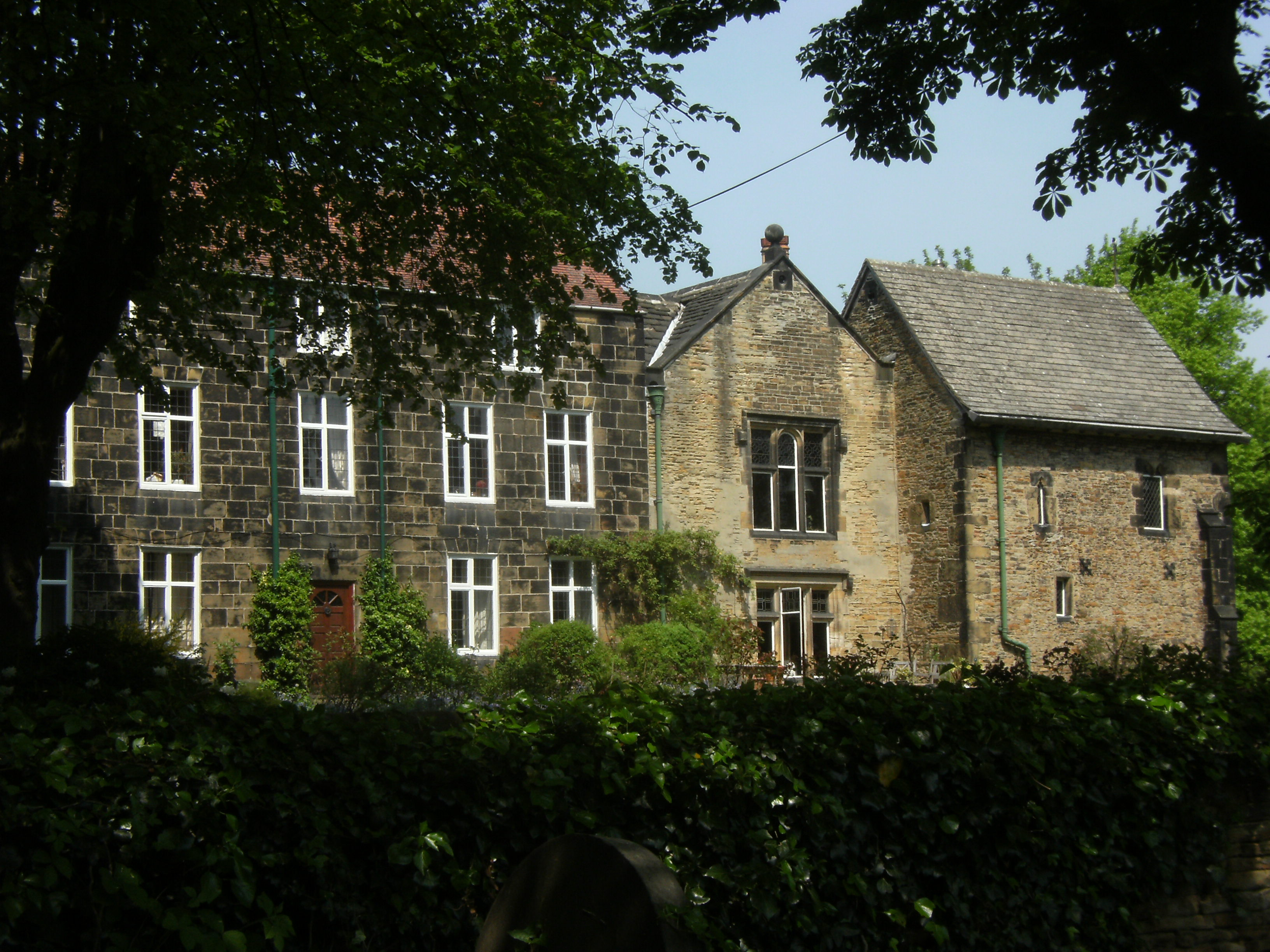
- Ecclesfield Priory, seen from the south. Ecclesfield Hall adjoins, to the left of the picture.
- Interactive map of Ecclesfield Priory

Monastery information
- Order: Benedictine
- Established: by 1273
- Disestablished: 1386
- Mother house: St Wandrille's Abbey

Site
- Location: Ecclesfield, South Yorkshire, England
- Coordinates: 53°26′38.3″N 1°28′14.5″W
- Visible remains: Chapel
- Public access: None

Ecclesfield Priory was a religious house of Benedictine monks, lying in the village of Ecclesfield, north of Sheffield in Yorkshire, England.

== History ==
=== Early history ===
Ecclesfield Church and a mill in the village were in the possession of St Wandrille's Abbey in Normandy by 1142, when this was confirmed by a papal bull of Pope Innocent II. These were the abbey's most northerly possessions, and probably their most valuable.

There is no written evidence of any building on the site before 1273, but an 1161 agreement between Richard de Lovetot and the abbey mentions "the monks of Ecclesfield". In 1866, an outer wall of the Priory was uncovered, at the west end of the chapel. The architect supervising the work claimed that this may have been 12th-century work, but there has been no further investigation of this.

=== Religious use ===
The Priory was in existence by 1273, when it was mentioned in a papal bull of Pope Clement IV, again confirming some of the abbey's possessions. It acted as a cell of the abbey in Normandy. Many writers have assumed that this demonstrates that the surviving structures were built prior to this date, but David Hey notes that it is possible that a 12th-century structure was in use and was only replaced a few years later.

The names of most priors from the early 14th century are known:

- To 1328: Robert de Bosco
- 1328 – 49: John de Fauvel
- 1349 – 69: Robert Gullielmi
- 1369 – 71: William Fulmere
- 1371 – 72: John Burdet
- 1372 – 85: Sir Henry de Medbourne

In 1357, the abbey sent two armed messengers to bring Gullielmi back because he had ignored a summons questioning his "evil life and embezzlement of the priory's goods". Fulmere was ejected as he was not ordained, and Burdet was imprisoned in Newgate for threatening Fulmere. Upon his release, Burdet unsuccessfully challenged de Medbourne's appointment in Parliament.

In 1386, the Priory was confiscated from the abbey during the Hundred Years' War and given to the Priory of St Anne in Coventry. This was a Carthusian house, and did not send monks to Ecclesfield Priory, instead appointing vicars and chaplains. This system survived until the Dissolution of the Monasteries.

The Valor Ecclesiasticus of 1535 noted that there was a dwelling house for the vicar, usually presumed to be either the Priory or a neighbouring structure. St Anne's was dissolved in 1539, and in 1542 the right to present vicars and collect tithes in Ecclesfield was purchased by Francis Talbot, 5th Earl of Shrewsbury; it then passed through several hands to the Shirecliffe family. They converted the building into a farmhouse under the name Ecclesfield Hall, inserting a fireplace and mullioned windows. The priory chapel and room below were not altered.

=== Domestic use ===
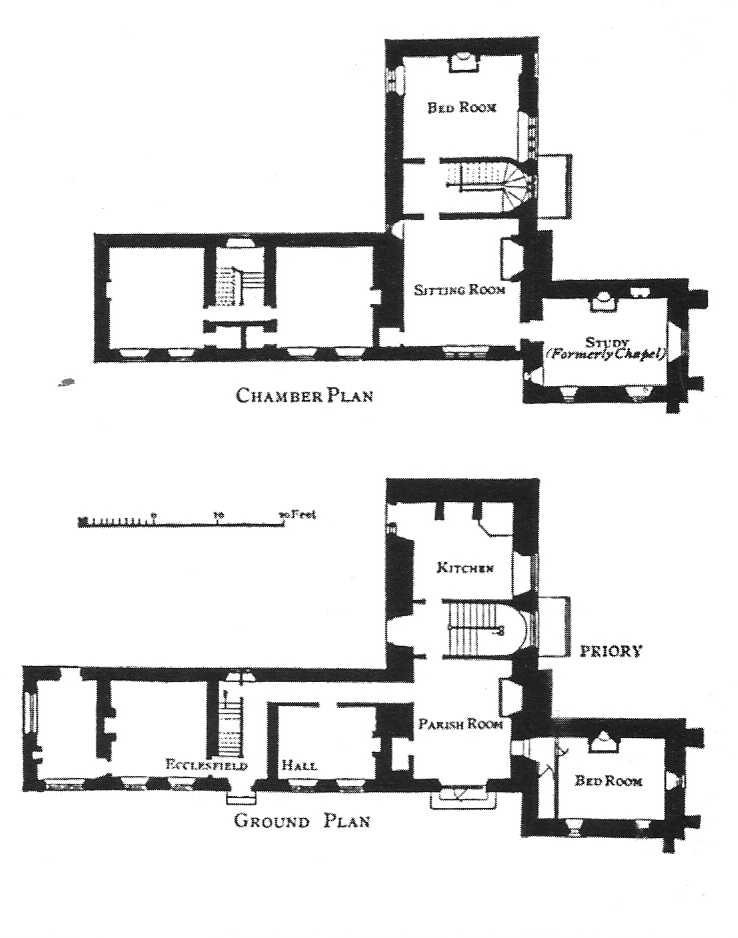
A plan of Ecclesfield Priory and Hall before the alterations of 1866; the Hall is to the left, the Priory to the right.

In 1637, John Harrison described "The scite of the mannor, or mansion house called Ecclesfield-hall with all the Out-houses there to belonginge some of them being in decay and some fallen downe. Also the orchard, gardens, yard, the conney-greave and the Intack lyinge next unto Ecclesfeild Churchyard..." An inventory of 1691 listed the Hall's rooms as "hall, little parlour adjoining to the hall, milk house, kitchen, brewhouse, oxen house, dining room, closet, buttery, cellar, Chappel parlour, passage, Chappel Chamber, Greene Chamber, passage, Servants Chamber, boulting house, hay lath, fold, stable and Old Chappell." The Hall was greatly extended in 1736. It is uncertain whether any parts of the old building were demolished at this time.

By the Victorian period, the Mediaeval portion had once again become known as "Ecclesfield Priory". Jonathan Eastwood wrote extensively about the Priory in his History of the Parish of Ecclesfield of 1862, and the surviving building was restored in 1866 by M. E. Hadfield. The Priory and Hall then became separate houses.

== Architecture ==
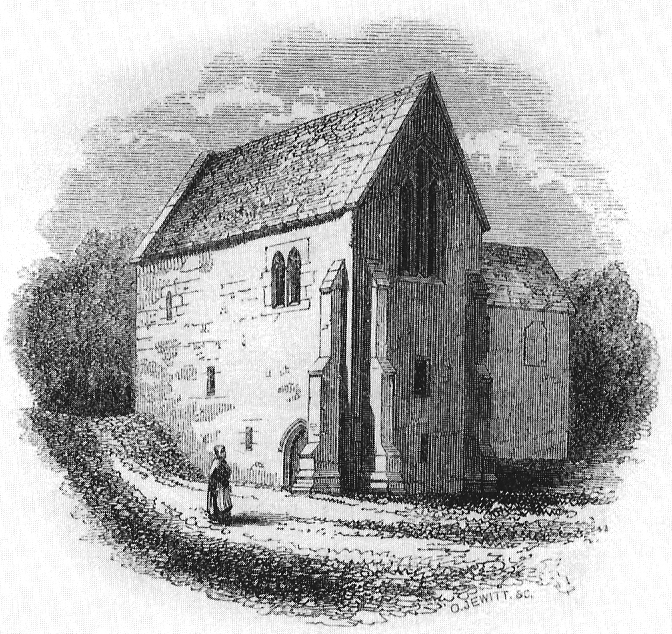
Ecclesfield Priory before the alterations of 1866; the adjoining Hall is not shown.

The surviving building consists of a north–south oriented block, with the chapel connected to its south-east corner. It is constructed of sandstone with Millstone Grit dressings and is built directly on the bedrock. The three-storey chapel block is of thinly coursed rubble, while the crosswing is of squared stone and is coursed.

The main block was substantially altered in the 17th century and again in 1866, with windows dating from both periods. One first-floor room has a barrel vaulted ceiling with relief panels, while the original pointed doorway into the chapel survives. The chapel contains more mediaeval work, including original lancet windows, a piscina and an aumbry.

The entire building is Grade II* listed.
