= Listed buildings in Sheffield =

Locations of Grade I listed buildings in Sheffield

There are about 1,000 listed buildings in Sheffield. Of these only five are Grade I listed, and 67 are Grade II*, the rest being Grade II listed. The buildings vary from a listed facade to the largest listed building in Europe (Park Hill).

The dates given refer to the year(s) of completion.

== Grade I ==
Building	Image	Date built	Architect
Abbeydale Industrial Hamlet (Works)		1785–1876	
Church of St. Nicholas, Bradfield		c.1200–c.1500	
Church of St. Mary, Ecclesfield		c.1200–	
Sheffield Cathedral		1430–1966	
Town Hall		1897	E. W. Mountford

== Grade II* ==
This is a complete list of all Grade II* listed buildings in Sheffield.

Building	Image	Date built	Architect
Paradise Square, Sheffield		1736–1771	
Abbeydale Industrial Hamlet (Workers' Cottages, Counting House and Manager's House)		1785–1876	
Church of St Thomas a Becket and remains of Beauchief Abbey		1176 or 1183	Church restored by Edward Pegge
Beauchief Hall and adjoining structures			
Beehive Works		1850s/60s	
Bishops' House		1554	The Blythe family
Botanical Gardens Glass House		1838	Benjamin Broomhead Taylor
Butchers Wheel		1820s-1870s	
City Hall		1934	Vincent Harris
Cornish Place (East and West Ranges)		1822–1860	Built for James Dixon & Sons
Cutlers' Hall		1832	Samuel Worth and B. B. Taylor
Ecclesfield Priory		c. 1273	
Endcliffe Hall		c. 1860	Built for Sir John Brown
Fair House Farmhouse, Low Bradfield		1630s	Unknown
Globe Works		1825	Henry and William Ibbotson
Entrance Gateway to Green Lane Works		1795, with alterations in 1860	Alfred Stevens
Heritage House, Infirmary Road		1797	John Rawsthorne
King Edward VII Upper School		1838	William Flockton
Leah's Yard, Cambridge Street		mid-19th century	
Little Matlock Rolling Mill		1882	
Loxley United Reformed Church		1787	
Lyceum Theatre		1897	W. G. R. Sprague
Turret House, Sheffield Manor		c. 1574	
Mappin Art Gallery (now part of Weston Park Museum)		1887	Flockton & Gibbs
The Mount, Glossop Road		c. 1830	William Flockton
Mount Pleasant Community Centre including former stables and coaching block		1777	John Platt
Norton Hall		1815	
Oakes Park and adjoining structures		1668	
Old Hall Farm, Brightholmlee		1483	
Old Queen's Head		c. 1475	
Onesacre Hall		1630–1670	John Hawley
Park Hill Flats		1961	Jack Lynn and Ivor Smith
Portland Works			
St James’ Church, Midhopestones		c. 1360	
St James, Norton			
St John, Ranmoor		1888	Flockton & Gibbs
St Mary's Church, Bramall Lane		1830	Joseph and Robert Potter
St Mary the Virgin, Beighton			
Sanderson Kayser's Darnall Works (two crucible steel shops)		1871	
Sharrow Mills		c. 1737	
Sheffield General Cemetery (Gatehouse, Egyptian Gate and Non-Conformist Chapel)		1836	Samuel Worth
Terminal Warehouse, Victoria Quays			
University of Sheffield Library and Arts Tower		1965	Gollins, Melvin, Ward & Partners
War Memorial		1925	Charles Denny Carus-Wilson
Well Meadow Street Crucible Furnace and attached buildings			
Whitley Hall Hotel		c. 1550s-1580s	Thomas & William Parker
Wicker Arches		1848	Sir John Fowler

== Grade II ==
Building	Date built	Architect
Abbeydale Picture House	1920	Dixon and Shenley
Former Adelphi Cinema	1920	William C. Fenton
Almshouse		
Attercliffe Chapel	1629 & 1909	
Banner Cross Hall	1821	Jeffry Wyattville
Banner Cross Methodist Church	1929	William John Hale
Barnes Hall	1824	
Birley Old Hall and Falconry	1705	
Birley Spa	1842	
Botanical Gardens Bear Pit	1836	
Botanical Gardens Pavilions	1836	Robert Marnock
The Britannia Inn, Attercliffe (former home of Benjamin Huntsman)	1772	
Brooklyn Works	mid 19th century	
Broom Hall	c.1498-1784	
Broomhill Church (west tower and porch)	1871	W. H. Crossland
Burrowlee House	1711	
Carbrook Hall Public House	c1620	
Carmel House (facade)	1890	
Cathedral Church of St Marie	1848	Matthew Hadfield
Cementation furnace, Doncaster Street	1848	built for Daniel Doncasters steelworks
Cemetery Road Baptist Church	1839	
Sheffield General Cemetery (Anglican Chapel, Registrar's House, & various monuments)	1836–1880	Samuel Worth, William Flockton, and others
Christ Church, Stannington	1830	Woodhead & Hurst
Crookes Cemetery Chapel	1908	C. and C.M. Hadfield
Crucible Theatre	1971	
Dial House	1802	
Fulwood Hall	15th century and 1620	
Fulwood Old Chapel	1729	
Gell Street Pavilion	1830s	
Hallfield House	mid-17th century	
Heeley Tramway Depot	1878	
Head Post Office Building, Fitzalan Square	1893 & 1910	J. Williams
The Herdings	1675	
High Storrs School	1933	
Hillsborough House	1779	
Hillsborough Primary School	1884	Wilson & Masters
King Edward VII Hospital, Rivelin (Now converted to apartments)	1916	W.A. Kenyon
Leader House	1770	
Loxley House	1826	
Monument to Thomas Wiley	1853	
Moore Street electricity substation	1968	Jefferson Sheard & Partners
Mylnhurst	1883	
97–117 Norfolk Street (including the Brown Bear public house)	late 18th century–1875	
Oakbrook House	c. 1855 - 1860	
Old Bank House, Hartshead	1728	
Oughtibridge railway station,	1845	
Our Lady & St Thomas Church	1933	M.J Gleeson
Parkhead Hall	1865	J. B. Mitchell-Withers (senior)
Revell Grange	mid 18th century	
Riverdale House	c. 1860	
Sacred Heart Church, Hillsborough	1936	C.M. Hadfield
Sheffield Castle	c1270	
Sheffield United Gas Light Company Offices	1875	M. E. Hadfield & Son
Shepherd Wheel	c. 1780	
Sir Frederick Mappin Building		
St George's Church, Portobello	1825	Woodhead & Hurst
St Mary's Church, Bolsterstone	1879	John Brearley
St Matthew's Church, Carver Street	1855	Flockton & Sons
St Michael's Cemetery, Rivelin (Chapel and Walsh memorial)	1877	Messrs Hadfield and Son
St Paul's Church, Wordsworth Avenue	1959	Basil Spence
St Saviour's Church, High Green	1872	James Brooks
Statue of King Edward VII, Fitzalan Square	1913	Alfred Drury
Stumperlowe Cottage	15th century	
Stumperlowe Hall	1854	
Sugworth Hall	16th century and later	
Tapton Hall	1855	Flockton & Son
Taylor's Eye Witness	1836	
Tinsley Park Cemetery	1882	
The Towers	1896	Flockton & Gibbs
Drama Studio, University of Sheffield	1869	C.J. Innocent
Underbank Chapel	1743	
Underbank Schoolroom	1853	
Upper Chapel	1700, 1848	John Frith
Victoria Hall	1908	Waddington Son & Dunkerley / William John Hale
Victoria Quays (various buildings)	1819–1900	
Wadsley Parish Church	1834	
Walkley Library	1905	Hemsoll & Paterson
Whirlow Hall Farm	1843	
The White Building, Fitzalan Square	1908	Flockton & Gibbs

== See also ==
- Grade I listed buildings in South Yorkshire
- Listed buildings in Sheffield City Centre
