= Listed buildings in Sheffield S6 =

The S6 district lies within the City of Sheffield, South Yorkshire, England. The district contains 180 listed buildings that are recorded in the National Heritage List for England. Of these, one is listed at Grade I, the highest of the three grades, four are at Grade II*, the middle grade, and the others are at Grade II, the lowest grade. The district is in the north west of the city of Sheffield, and covers the areas of Bradfield, Dungworth, Hillsborough, Loxley, Malin Bridge, Middlewood, Stannington, Upperthorpe, Wadsley and Walkley.

For neighbouring areas, see listed buildings in S3, listed buildings in S5, listed buildings in S10, listed buildings in S35, listed buildings in Derwent, Derbyshire, listed buildings in Hathersage, listed buildings in Midhopestones and listed buildings in Stocksbridge.

== Key ==
Grade	Criteria
I	Buildings of exceptional interest, sometimes considered to be internationally important
II*	Particularly important buildings of more than special interest
II	Buildings of national importance and special interest

== Buildings ==
Name and location	Street	Photograph	Date	Notes	Grade
St Nicholas, Bradfield; 53.42900°N 1.59936°W	Towngate		14th century		I
Stannington Cross; 53.39233°N 1.53246°W	Oldfield Road		Medieval	At junction with Stannington Road	II
Pond Farmhouse; 53.39356°N 1.54082°W	Stannington Road		Late Medieval		II
Tomhill Farmhouse Cowhouse; 53.40575°N 1.58362°W	Main Road		About 16th century		II
Hall Broom Farmhouse; 53.40314°N 1.59431°W	Sidling Hollow		1620		II
Hoyles Farmhouse; 53.41074°N 1.64177°W	Blindside Lane		1620		II
Woodseats Farmhouse; 53.42830°N 1.62712°W	Windy Bank		1631		II
Bingley Seat; 53.38518°N 1.56648°W	Woodbank Road		17th century		II
Briers House Farm Barn; 53.41017°N 1.58170°W	Briers House Lane		17th century		II
Fair Flats Farm Barn and Cottage; 53.42155°N 1.58154°W	Kirk Edge Road		17th century		II
Fair House Farmhouse Garage and Stable; 53.42267°N 1.61003°W	Annet Lane		17th century		II
Hall Broom Farm Barn and Cowhouse; 53.40326°N 1.59471°W	Sidling Hollow		17th century		II
Hallfield House; 53.41945°N 1.64904°W	Mortimer Road		17th century		II
Hallfield House Barn; 53.41977°N 1.64907°W	Mortimer Road		17th century		II
Hoyles Farmhouse Barn (5m west); 53.41070°N 1.64201°W	Blindside Lane		17th century		II
Hoyles Farmhouse Barn (250m west); 53.40956°N 1.64484°W	Blindside Lane		17th century		II
Nether Farmhouse; 53.42412°N 1.60771°W	The Sands		17th century		II
Strines Inn; 53.41191°N 1.66653°W	Mortimer Road		17th century		II
Sugworth Hall; 53.40276°N 1.65273°W	Sugworth Road		17th century		II
Throstle Nest Barn; 53.40352°N 1.56630°W	Storrs		17th century		II
Tomhill Farmhouse; 53.40605°N 1.58357°W	Main Road		17th century		II
Tomhill Farmhouse Western Cruck Barn; 53.40595°N 1.58378°W	Main Road		17th century		II
Ughill Manor Barn and Cowhouse; 53.41006°N 1.61269°W	Tinker Bottom		17th century		II
Walker House Farm Barn; 53.42297°N 1.62468°W	Dale Road		17th century		II
White House Farmhouse; 53.38905°N 1.55000°W	Nethergate		Mid 17th century		II
Woodseats Farm Barn; 53.42839°N 1.62661°W	Windy Bank		17th century		II
Spout House; 53.39522°N 1.55064°W	Spout Lane		1671	Destroyed in a fire in 2016	II
Bowsen Cruck Barn; 53.43446°N 1.60319°W	Penistone Road		Late 17th century	West of Brown House Lane/Bolsterstone Lane junction	II
Far House; 53.42028°N 1.56995°W	Holdworth Lane		Late 17th century		II
Flash Cottage; 53.38571°N 1.57577°W	Flash Lane		Late 17th century		II
The Orchard; 53.42764°N 1.50233°W	Fox Hill Crescent		Late 17th century		II
Smallfield Barn and Cowhouse; 53.43170°N 1.61208°W	Smallfield Lane		Late 17th century		II
Well House; 53.39029°N 1.54816°W	Oldfield Road		Late 17th century		II
Fair House Farmhouse; 53.42273°N 1.60986°W	Annet Lane		1687		II*
Birley Old Hall; 53.43042°N 1.50474°W	Edge Lane		1705		II
Birley Old Hall Falconry; 53.43038°N 1.50420°W	Edge Lane		About 1705		II
Burrowlee House; 53.40670°N 1.49850°W	Broughton Road		1711		II
Broggin House; 53.41218°N 1.65473°W	Mortimer Road		1718	At Strines Reservoir dam wall	II
Lower Thornseat Farmhouse; 53.42390°N 1.63527°W	Dale Road		1721		II
Wadsley Hall; 53.40949°N 1.50888°W	Far Lane		1722		II
Green Fold Farmhouse; 53.40769°N 1.58005°W	Dungworth Green		Early 18th century		II
Oaks Farmhouse; 53.41259°N 1.58927°W	Oaks Lane		Early 18th century		II
Ronkesley Hall; 53.38451°N 1.59157°W	Onkesley Lane		Early 18th century		II
Ughill Manor; 53.41014°N 1.61305°W	Tinker Bottom		Early 18th century		II
Wadsley Hall Farmhouse; 53.40956°N 1.50843°W	Far Lane		Early 18th century		II
Fox House Farmhouse and Cottage; 53.39220°N 1.55198°W	Uppergate Road		1738		II
Guide Pillar; 53.44945°N 1.63241°W	Penistone Road		1740	At junction with Mortimer Road	II
Underbank Chapel; 53.39413°N 1.55593°W	Stannington Road		1743		II
Ashby Cottage; 53.42914°N 1.59847°W	Jane Street		Mid-18th century		II
Croft House Bridge; 53.40152°N 1.55047°W	N/A		18th century	Near Rowel Lane	II
Padley Cottages; 53.40742°N 1.57886°W	Dungworth Green		Mid-18th century		II
Padley Farmhouse Gate Piers; 53.40735°N 1.57880°W	Dungworth Green		Mid-18th century		II
Revell Grange; 53.38597°N 1.56276°W	Bingley Lane		Mid-18th century		II
Rose and Crown; 53.41111°N 1.52192°W	Stour Lane		Mid-18th century		II
Take Off Stone; 53.41258°N 1.66621°W	Mortimer Road		18th century	North of Strines Inn	II
Underbank Chapel Keeper's House; 53.39409°N 1.55612°W	Stannington Road		Mid-18th century		II
Holdworth Cottage; 53.41364°N 1.57238°W	Loxley Road		1752		II
Guide Pillar; 53.44323°N 1.60984°W	Penistone Road		1753	At Handsome Cross	II
Birley House; 53.43107°N 1.50420°W	Edge Lane		Late 18th century		II
Birley House Gates and Wall; 53.43095°N 1.50424°W	Edge Lane		Late 18th century		II
Burnside Cottages; 53.42311°N 1.60444°W	Wood Fall Lane		Late 18th century		II
Church, Wesley and Vestry Cottages; 53.42880°N 1.59828°W	Towngate		Late 18th century		II
Coppice House; 53.38428°N 1.55050°W	Rivelin Valley Road		About 1775		II
Old Watch House; 53.42900°N 1.59885°W	Jane Street		Late 18th century		II
Packhorse Bridge; 53.38142°N 1.56225°W	N/A		About 1775	East of Rails Road	II
Revell Grange Cottage; 53.38582°N 1.56305°W	Bingley Lane		Late 18th century		II
Hillsborough House; 53.40692°N 1.50262°W	Middlewood Road		1779		II
Loxley United Reformed Church; 53.40743°N 1.54571°W	Loxley Road		1787		II*
87 Infirmary Road; 53.39012°N 1.48124°W	Infirmary Road		1797	Designed by John Rawsthorne	II
Heritage House; 53.38994°N 1.48283°W	Infirmary Road		1797	Designed by John Rawsthorne	II*
River Dale House and Cottages; 53.40122°N 1.53532°W	Low Matlock Lane		About 1800		II
Sykehouse; 53.40472°N 1.57518°W	Sykehouse Lane		About 1800		II
Dial House; 53.40768°N 1.51243°W	Ben Lane		1802		II
Robin Hood Inn; 53.39917°N 1.53347°W	Greaves Lane		1804		II
239 Rural Lane; 53.41317°N 1.52102°W	Rural Lane		1806		II
Bradfield Parish Council Offices; 53.42198°N 1.60573°W	Mill Lee Road		1817		II
Rivelin Mill Bridge; 53.38036°N 1.56574°W	Manchester Road		1819		II
Wadsley House; 53.41119°N 1.51187°W	The Drive		About 1823		II
Bents Farm Cart Shed; 53.39647°N 1.58097°W	Bents Lane		Early 19th century		II
Birley Hall Coachhouse; 53.43080°N 1.50467°W	Edge Lane		Early 19th century		II
Birley Hall Farmhouse; 53.43066°N 1.50461°W	Edge Lane		Early 19th century		II
Chase Farm Cowhouse; 53.40456°N 1.53816°W	Loxley Road		Early 19th century		II
Hillsborough Park East Lodge; 53.40872°N 1.49777°W	Middlewood Road		Early 19th century		II
Hillsborough Park East Lodge Gateway and Wall; 53.40867°N 1.49766°W	Middlewood Road		Early 19th century		II
Hillsborough Park West Lodge; 53.40766°N 1.50390°W	Middlewood Road		Early 19th century		II
Hollins Bridge; 53.39296°N 1.51639°W	Hollins Lane		Early 19th century		II
Malin Bridge Corn Mill; 53.40013°N 1.51214°W	Loxley Road		Early 19th century		II
Mousehole Forge Meeting and Exhibition Rooms; 53.39759°N 1.51246°W	Stannington Road		Early 19th century		II
Old Post Office Stables; 53.42892°N 1.59840°W	Towngate		Early 19th century		II
Olive House; 53.40150°N 1.54489°W	Black Lane		Early 19th century		II
Roscoe Bridge; 53.39007°N 1.52417°W	N/A		Early 19th century		II
St Vincents Presbytery; 53.38907°N 1.49790°W	Howard Road		Early 19th century	Now the Sheffield Buddhist Centre	II
Wadsley Stocks; 53.40940°N 1.52090°W	Rural Lane		Early 19th century		II
Wood Lane House Farm; 53.39841°N 1.51752°W	Wood Lane		Early 19th century		II
Loxley House; 53.40876°N 1.52625°W	Ben Lane		1826		II
Hannah Rawson School; 53.42093°N 1.49389°W	Halifax Road		1829		II
22 Blake Grove Road; 53.39003°N 1.48954°W	Blake Grove Road		About 1830		II
Christ Church; 53.39187°N 1.54702°W	Chapel Lane		1830	Designed by Woodhead and Hurst	II
Hillsborough House Coach House and Stable; 53.40724°N 1.50308°W	Middlewood Road		About 1830		II
Wadsley Parish Church; 53.41208°N 1.51768°W	Worrall Lane		1834	Designed by Joseph Potter	II
Wadsley School; 53.41234°N 1.51868°W	Worrall Lane		1838		II
Wadsley Almshouses; 53.41266°N 1.51894°W	Worrall Road		1839		II
Eversley House; 53.38938°N 1.48549°W	Upperthorpe Road		About 1840		II
83 and 85 Infirmary Road; 53.38985°N 1.48077°W	Infirmary Road		About 1840		II
St Stephens Vicarage; 53.38947°N 1.48520°W	Upperthorpe Road		About 1840		II
113 Upperthorpe Road; 53.38937°N 1.48496°W	Upperthorpe Road		About 1840		II
Wadsley Vicarage; 53.41222°N 1.51688°W	Worrall Lane		About 1840		II
Edgefield Monument; 53.41534°N 1.61742°W	Stones Road		Mid 19th century		II
Fox Holes Farm; 53.41664°N 1.60470°W	Stones Road		Mid 19th century		II
Guide Pillar; 53.44450°N 1.59142°W	Bolsterstone Road		19th century	At junction with Onesmoor Road	II
Guide Pillar; 53.45034°N 1.59538°W	Bolsterstone Road		19th century	At junction with Walker Edge	II
Guide Pillar; 53.43670°N 1.59015°W	Onesacre Road		19th century	At junction with Peat Pits Lane	II
Milepost; 53.38668°N 1.62681°W	A57		19th century	East of Black Rock	II
Milepost; 53.38869°N 1.64952°W	A57		19th century	West of Moscar Cross	II
Milepost; 53.38349°N 1.60470°W	A57		19th century	West of Swinglee Ford	II
Old Post Office; 53.42897°N 1.59864°W	Towngate		Mid 19th century		II
Old Wheel Farmhouse; 53.40536°N 1.55506°W	Rowel Lane		Mid 19th century		II
Olive Cottages; 53.40137°N 1.54359°W	Black Lane		Mid 19th century		II
Olive Wheel Mill; 53.40101°N 1.54343°W	Black Lane		Mid 19th century		II
St Nicholas, Bradfield Gates, Piers and Railings; 53.42873°N 1.59894°W	Towngate		Mid 19th century		II
Underbank Schoolroom; 53.39373°N 1.55653°W	Stopes Road		1853		II
Hillsborough Barracks Central Stable Block; 53.40214°N 1.49484°W	Langsett Road		1854		II
Hillsborough Barracks Guardroom, Wall and Towers; 53.40176°N 1.49346°W	Langsett Road		1854		II
Hillsborough Barracks Infirmary; 53.40159°N 1.49805°W	Langsett Road		1854		II
Hillsborough Barracks Magazine; 53.40191°N 1.49308°W	Langsett Road		1854	Integrated into the Garrison Hotel	II
Hillsborough Barracks Mobilization Store and Squash Court; 53.40116°N 1.49422°W	Langsett Road		1854		II
Hillsborough Barracks North West Barracks; 53.40160°N 1.49739°W	Langsett Road		1854		II
Hillsborough Barracks North West Wall and Towers; 53.40193°N 1.49788°W	Langsett Road		1854		II
Hillsborough Barracks Officers Mess and Regimental Institute; 53.40070°N 1.49672°W	Langsett Road		1854		II
Hillsborough Barracks Riding School; 53.40143°N 1.49384°W	Langsett Road		1854		II
Hillsborough Barracks South East Barracks; 53.40080°N 1.49508°W	Langsett Road		1854		II
Hillsborough Barracks South East Store; 53.40125°N 1.49354°W	Langsett Road		1854	Now known as Hussar Court	II
Hillsborough Barracks South East Wall and Towers; 53.40077°N 1.49445°W	Langsett Road		1854		II
St Mary; 53.39156°N 1.49937°W	Howard Road		1869	Designed by J. G. Weightman	II
Byewash Bridge; 53.42034°N 1.63346°W	N/A		About 1870	At Dale Dyke Reservoir	II
St Joseph; 53.38890°N 1.49818°W	Howard Road		1870		II
Walkley National School; 53.39204°N 1.49971°W	Howard Road		1871	Designed by J. G. Weightman	II
Crookesmoor School; 53.38669°N 1.49066°W	Crookesmoor Road		1874	Designed by Innocent & Brown	II
St John the Baptist; 53.40527°N 1.49569°W	Penistone Road		1874	Designed by J. B. Mitchell-Withers	II
Walkley Board School and Caretakers House; 53.39609°N 1.49655°W	Burnaby Walk		1874	Designed by Innocent & Brown. Converted into student accommodation and now known as Walkley House	II
Hillsborough Schools Caretakers House; 53.41081°N 1.50378°W	Parkside Road		Late 19th century	Designed by Wilson & Masters	II
Hillsborough Schools Rear Range; 53.41094°N 1.50340°W	Parkside Road		Late 19th century	Facing Catch Bar Lane	II
Middlewood Church; 53.41699°N 1.51601°W	Middlewood Drive		1875	Designed by Bernard Hartley	II
Sewer Gas Lamp; 53.42497°N 1.50066°W	Fox Hill Road		Late 19th century	Camborne Road	II
Sewer Gas Lamp; 53.40368°N 1.50915°W	Oakland Road		Late 19th century	At junction with Portsea Road	II
Sewer Gas Lamp; 53.41299°N 1.52083°W	Rural Lane		Late 19th century	Outside 237 Rural Lane	II
Upperthorpe Library; 53.39028°N 1.48721°W	Daniel Hill		1876	Designed by E. Mitchell Gibbs	II
Crookesmoor School Caretakers House; 53.38701°N 1.49069°W	Crookesmoor Road		1877		II
Middlewood Lodge; 53.41682°N 1.51171°W	Middlewood Rise		1877	Designed by Bernard Hartley	II
Kingswood Hall; 53.41904°N 1.52324°W	Kingswood		1878	Designed by Bernard Hartley	II
St Michael's Cemetery Chapel; 53.39165°N 1.51662°W	Rivelin Valley Road		1878	Designed by Charles Hadfield	II
Crookesmoor Vestry Hall and Caretakers House; 53.38712°N 1.49144°W	Crookesmoor Road		About 1880		II
Crookes Valley Methodist Church; 53.38547°N 1.49338°W	Crookesmoor Road		1880		II
Little Matlock Rolling Mill; 53.40077°N 1.53591°W	Low Matlock Lane		1882		II*
Hillsborough Schools; 53.41040°N 1.50303°W	Parkside Road		1884	Designed by Wilson & Masters	II
Hillsborough Schools Headmasters House; 53.41032°N 1.50399°W	Parkside Road		About 1884	Designed by Wilson & Masters	II
The Roundhouse; 53.38981°N 1.48362°W	Infirmary Road		1884	Designed by John Dodsley Webster	II
St Josephs School; 53.38915°N 1.49678°W	Howard Road		1889		II
Walkley Ebenezer Methodist Church; 53.39309°N 1.50107°W	South Road		1890	Designed by W. J. Taylor	II
Walsh Monument; 53.39137°N 1.51656°W	Rivelin Valley Road		About 1890	Within St Michael's Cemetery	II
G. H. Foster Monument; 53.39171°N 1.51677°W	Rivelin Valley Road		1894	Within St Michael's Cemetery	II
Bole Hill Primary School; 53.39331°N 1.50757°W	Bole Hill Road		1896	Designed by William John Hale	II
Bole Hill Primary School Caretakers House; 53.39367°N 1.50695°W	Bole Hill Road		1896	Designed by William John Hale	II
Bole Hill Primary School Walls, Railings and Outbuilding; 53.39325°N 1.50800°W	Bole Hill Road		1896	Designed by William John Hale	II
Centenary House; 53.38976°N 1.48464°W	Albert Terrace Road		1897	Designed by John Dodsley Webster	II
Walkley Library Wall and Plaque; 53.39490°N 1.50320°W	South Road		1903	Designed by Hemsoll & Patterson	II
Walkley Library; 53.39483°N 1.50302°W	South Road		1905	Designed by Hemsoll & Paterson	II
25 and 27 Holme Lane; 389 and 391 Walkley Lane; 53.40204°N 1.50152°W	Holme Lane/Walkley Lane		1911		II
King Edward VII Hospital; 53.38357°N 1.55593°W	Rivelin Valley Road		1913	Designed by A. W. Kenyon	II
King Edward VII Hospital Boiler House; 53.38370°N 1.55674°W	Rivelin Valley Road		1913	Designed by A. W. Kenyon	II
King Edward VII Hospital Lodge; 53.382777°N 1.55629°W	Rivelin Valley Road		1913	Designed by A. W. Kenyon	II
King Edward VII Hospital Octagonal Building; 53.38339°N 1.55816°W	Rivelin Valley Road		1913	Designed by A. W. Kenyon	II
Stannington War Memorial; 53.39266°N 1.54802°W	Upper Gate Road		1921		II
Walkley War Memorial; 53.39145°N 1.49915°W	Howard Road		1922		II
Owlerton War Memorial Hall; 53.40140°N 1.50001°W	Forbes Road		1925		II
Owlerton War Memorial Hall Wall, Railing and Gates; 53.40135°N 1.49981°W	Forbes Road		1925		II
Sugworth Tower; 53.40549°N 1.65487°W	Sugworth Road		1927		II
K6 phone box 53.40185°N 1.49985°W	Langsett Road		Designed 1935	Located by Rawson Spring pub	II
K6 phone box 53.42831°N 1.59750°W	Loxley Road		Designed 1935	At junction with Kirk Edge Road	II
Sacred Heart; 53.40120°N 1.49927°W	Forbes Road		1936	Designed by C. M. Hadfield	II
