= Stannington, Sheffield =

Suburb of Sheffield in South Yorkshire, England

Coordinates: 53.396°N 1.536°W

Stannington
- Suburb
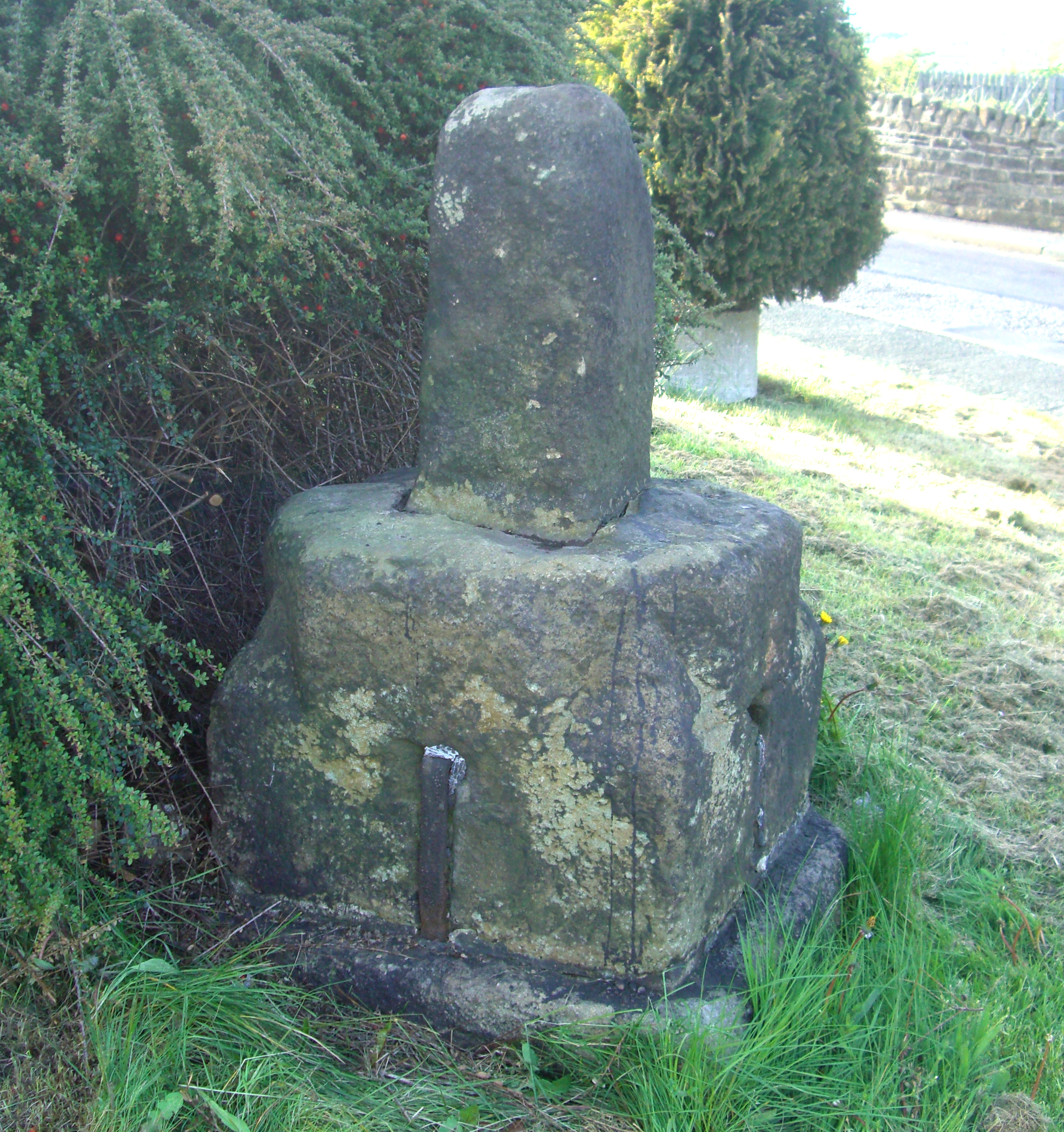
- Stannington Cross

- Location within South Yorkshire
- Population: 18,607
- Metropolitan borough: Sheffield
- Metropolitan county: South Yorkshire
- Region: Yorkshire and the Humber
- Country: England
- Sovereign state: United Kingdom
- Post town: SHEFFIELD
- Postcode district: S6
- Dialling code: 0114
- Police: South Yorkshire
- Fire: South Yorkshire
- Ambulance: Yorkshire
- UK Parliament: Sheffield Hallam

Stannington is a suburb in the City of Sheffield, England. The area is located in the civil parish of Bradfield, and is in the electoral ward of Stannington. Stannington is on the western edge of the Sheffield urban area, around 3 miles (5 km) from the city centre.

== History and description ==
Stannington is a suburb of Sheffield to the west of the city centre, located on the hill between the River Rivelin and River Loxley. There is evidence of Roman occupation of the area which comes from tablets found on the Stannington side of the Rivelin Valley (bronze artefacts, Stannington Diploma of A.D. 124, found 1761, now in the British Museum) which record the granting of land to retiring Roman auxiliaries of the Sunuci tribe. Other evidence of nearby Roman occupation comes from finds on Walkley Bank Road, which leads onto the ridge facing Stannington. The village has grown from the two settlements of Upper Gate and Nethergate. The settlement was mentioned in medieval times when a charter was granted to all men of Stannington and Morewood giving them the right to gather green and dry wood and turn out their cattle throughout the whole forest in Rivelin for a payment of four pounds in silver yearly. Stannington cross dates from the same period, Harrison's survey of 1637 describes it as a "stump cross of medieval origin". The date of erection has been estimated as 13th or 14th century, it stands at the junction of Oldfield Road and Stannington Road. Stannington officially became part of Sheffield in 1974 under the Local Government Act 1972. Previous to that it had been part of Wortley Rural District and was on the boundary of the West Riding of Yorkshire. The village of Stannington, which is part of the original Wortley district and marked by the "Rural District of Wortley" sign at the junction of Oldfield Road and Stannington Road; and the newer conurbations of Deer Park and Roscoe Bank primarily grew out from Malin Bridge from the 1960s onwards.

Significant buildings in the area include the Christ Church parish church on Church Street; the Unitarian chapel, Underbank Chapel; and the country house, Revell Grange; all of which are Grade II listed structures. Stannington is served by bus routes 81 and 82 from Sheffield, and by services 61 and 62 which provide a link with the local villages of Dungworth, Low and High Bradfield, Loxley and the Sheffield suburbs of Malin Bridge and Hillsborough where journeys may be continued to Sheffield by Sheffield Supertram. The area of Stannington was also home to a council run branch library until this facility was withdrawn in 2014 by the local authority as a cost cutting measure. The replacement of this council run service by a volunteer-led facility has been controversial, with prominent library campaign group Voices For The Library highlighting major concerns around volunteers having responsibility for the "Books On Prescription" service and issues surrounding data protection. The transfer of the library to volunteers has also resulted in huge decreases in book loans and other usage.

== Industry ==
During the early 1800s, the Stannington area together with the nearby Loxley Valley became an important producer of refractory bricks for the expanding Sheffield steel industry. The bricks were used to line the furnaces and were made from ganister, a sort of sandstone, and more importantly from fireclay from the Stannington pot clay seam which was prevalent in the area. Many ganister (or gannister) and fireclay mines and quarries existed in the area with the major ones being owned by the local firms of Siddons Brothers. (High Matlock Road ganister quarry) and J & J Dyson (firebrick works, Griffs Works, Stopes Road) which sprang up in the district. Refractory material production began c. 1810 and ceased in 2012. Dyson's works along with those of Thos. Wragg and Thos. Marshall (both in the Loxley Valley) specialised in manufacturing fireclay-based casting pit (pouring pit) refractory holloware and ladle flow control bricks for the steel industry worldwide. All three refractory plants (Dyson, Marshall and Wragg) closed following a collapse in demand for casting pit refractories of the uphill teeming type made locally mainly because of the introduction of continuous casting of steel worldwide and the general decline of the British steel industry.

== See also ==
- Listed buildings in Sheffield S6 - Wikipedia
- Stannington War Memorial
