= Stannington War Memorial =

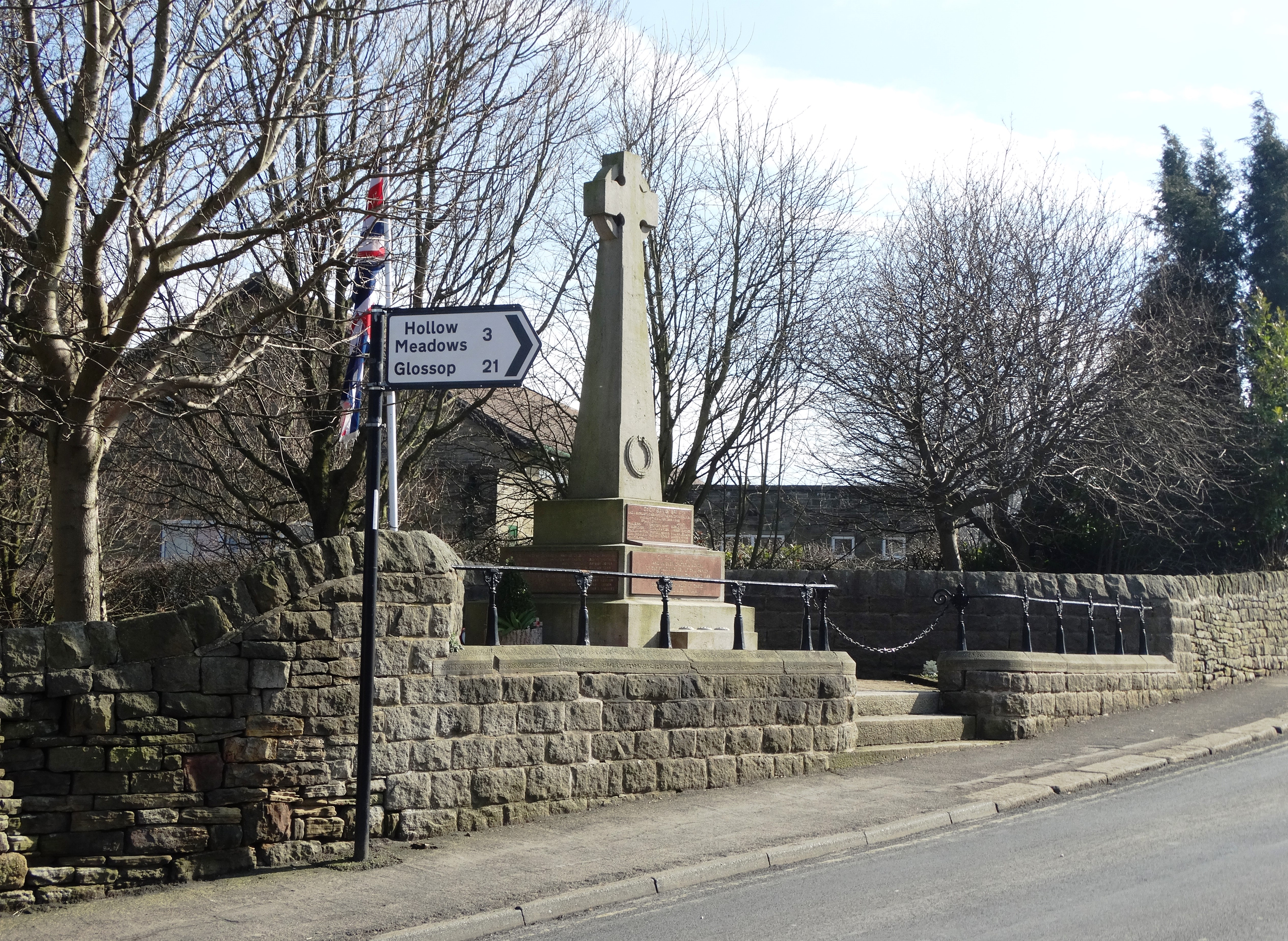
- Stannington War Memorial

- Location in South Yorkshire
- 53°23′34″N 1°32′53″W
- Location: Stannington, South Yorkshire, England

Listed Building – Grade II
- Official name: War Memorial
- Designated: 14 May 2019
- Reference no.: 1463548

Stannington War Memorial is a 20th-century grade II listed war memorial in Stannington, Sheffield, South Yorkshire.

== Description ==
The Memorial stands on the west end of Stannington Park, on Church Street. The memorial is dedicated to local casualties of both World Wars.

The memorial has been Grade II listed since 14 May 2019.

== See also ==
- Listed buildings in Sheffield S6
