= St Michael's Cemetery, Sheffield =

Cemetery in Sheffield, England

Coordinates: 53.3917°N 1.5166°W

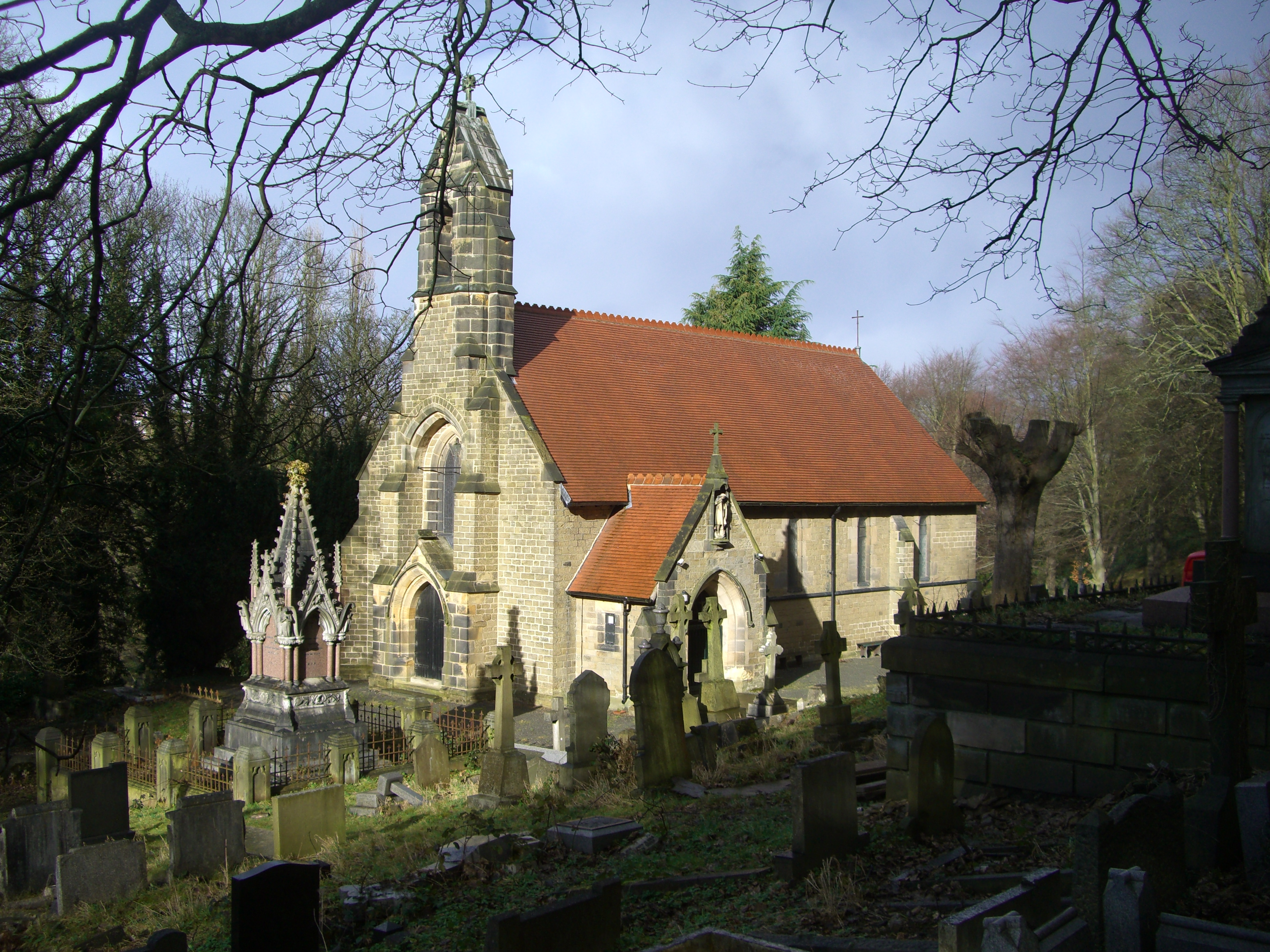
The cemetery chapel

St Michael's Cemetery is a Catholic burial ground in the Rivelin Valley area of Sheffield, South Yorkshire, England. The cemetery stands on a steep hillside on the south side of Rivelin Valley Road at its junction with Rivelin Road and Hollins Lane.

== History ==
In the early 1860s there was no consecrated ground for the burial of Catholic people within the boundaries of Sheffield. This came about largely because of past persecution resulting from the English Reformation of the 16th century. Father Burke of St Vincent's Church on Solly Street in the city, being quite concerned about this began a search for a suitable burial ground and finally purchased an eight-acre site on a sloping hillside in Rivelin Glen. The plot of land was bought for £600 in the Spring of 1862 from Mr. Wilson of Loxley, a member of the famous Wilson family of snuff manufacturers. The site was quickly enclosed and walled off at a further cost of £250 and received official Government approval as a burial ground on 25 August 1862.

On 29 September 1862 (Michaelmas day) Robert Cornthwaite, Bishop of Beverley laid and consecrated the cornerstone of the original St Michael's chapel. When later writing about the laying of the cornerstone, Father Burke revealed the names of some of the benefactors who helped pay for the cemetery. He wrote, "a few humble Irish Catholics who had by good conduct and honest industry, realised a little property, offered to supply £500 or £600 to purchase a graveyard". They were Michael Monaghan, Lawrence Brown and James Callaghan. A further £200 was donated by a Mr. Hodgkinson "a worthy English gentleman" and these four along with Father Burke and Arnold Sutton of Revell Grange were named as trustees of the cemetery.

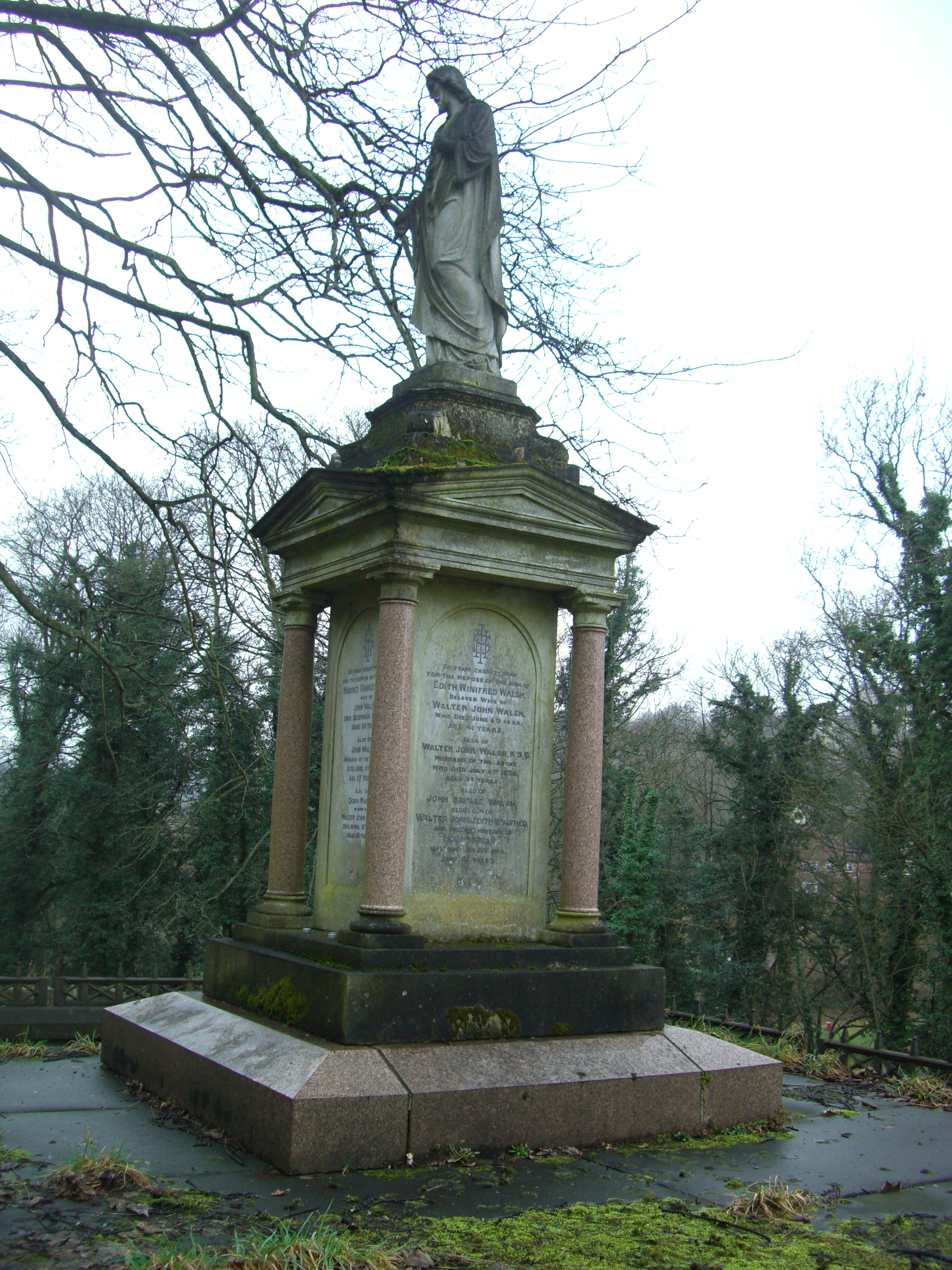
The Walsh memorial

It is believed that the first interments in the new cemetery took place on 23 September 1862 when two young children Mary Mulvey, aged three and Catherine Hopkins, aged seven were buried at St Michael's. By the summer of 1863 the work on the cemetery and its chapel were complete with the final cost coming to £1,400. On 26 October 1863 the chapel was blessed by Father Burke and dedicated to St Michael the Archangel. In December of that year the St Vincent Catholic Young Men's Society donated a statue of Saint Patrick and a set of bas relief Stations of the Cross which were erected in the chapel.

The original chapel was always meant to a temporary building and in 1877 a new permanent building was erected at a cost of £2,000, which was donated by George Harvey Foster, a local businessman in the tailoring trade, and his wife Mary Ann. This gift is marked by a marble plaque on the right (epistle) side of the chapel. The Foster family also have a family crypt close to the chapel, which is marked by an ornate pointed monument. The new chapel was opened and blessed, again by Robert Cornthwaite (now Bishop of Leeds), on 11 December 1877.

== Chapel architecture ==
The chapel is in the Early English style and was designed by the architects Messrs Hadfield and Son with Mr. M.J. Dowling used as the contractor. It is built of dressed Greenmoor wallstone with Worrall stone dressing, internally it is 22 feet wide and 72 feet long, the roof is covered by Staffordshire tiles. At the chapel's western end is a sixty foot high bell turret in which hangs a five cwt bell by Mears of London. The chapel was designated a Grade II listed building in December 1984. The cemetery's most notable grave is the Walsh monument, which is a Grade II listed structure. This is a vault and memorial constructed for the Walsh family, it consist of mostly granite and marble with decorative cast-iron railings and a 1.5-metre-high (4.9 ft) figure on top.

=== Interior ===
The altar is made of polished marble and veined alabaster and has a figure of the dead Christ lying beneath it, sculpted by Messrs R. L. Boulton & Sons of Cheltenham. The chancel has a floor made of patterned encaustic tiles. John Francis Bentley designed the three east windows which feature, The Risen Christ, The Blessed Virgin and St John, they were produced by the firm of Lavers, Barraud and Westlake. In 1884 the Foster family financed improvements to the interior to the tune of £430. These featured designs by Nathaniel Westlake and Matthew Hadfield and included the west window (in memory of Father James Fitzgerald), the Sienese crucifix and wall paintings of the four Resurrections.

== War graves ==
The cemetery contains the graves of 30 Commonwealth service personnel, registered and maintained by the Commonwealth War Graves Commission, 24 from World War I and 6 from World War II.
