= Moore Street electricity substation =

Electrical substation in Sheffield, England

Coordinates: 53.37471°N 1.47854°W

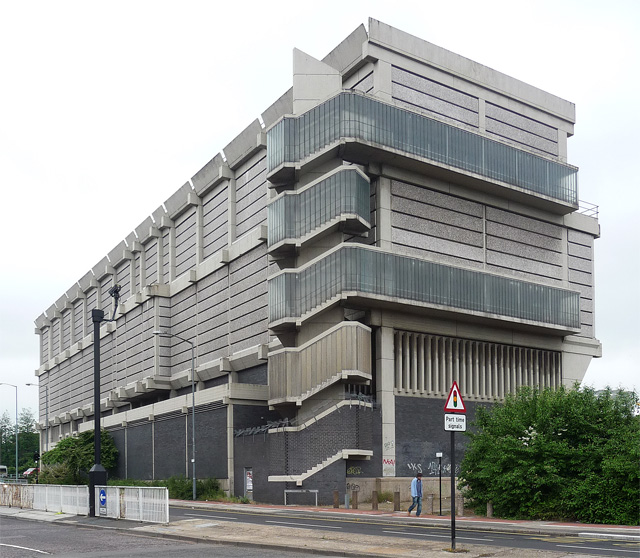
The substation seen from the east

The Moore Street electricity substation is an electrical substation in Sheffield, England, designed by Jefferson Sheard in 1968. The substation is an example of Brutalist architecture. Owen Hatherley describes it as "a shocking paroxysm of a building, an explosion in reinforced concrete, a bunker built with an aesthete's attention to detail, a building which is genuinely Brutalist in both senses of the term."

The building was illuminated in October 2010. Paul Scriven, then the leader of Sheffield City Council, commented "The newly lit building will be a shining beacon for the city and an iconic landmark on the inner relief road" and described the substation as "an iconic building which has been important in keeping the lights on in Sheffield since the 1960s."

The building was granted Grade II listed status by English Heritage in September 2013, with the building being described, as a "massive and uncompromising bunker which by its plainness and fully-displayed structure expresses a highly appropriate impression of enormous energy confined and controlled within."
