= Jefferson Sheard Architects =

British architectural firm

Jefferson Sheard Architects is a British architectural design firm based in Sheffield, Manchester, Peterborough and London. It was founded in 1958. The founding partners were Bryan Jefferson and Gerry Sheard. Bryan Jefferson was President of the RIBA in 1979–1981. One of the first projects by the practice in the 1960s was the Moore Street electricity substation in Sheffield which was Grade II Listed in 2013. The giant concrete building was illuminated in October 2011 as part of Urban Design Week, funded by National Grid. The practice has completed more projects in the city including the Sheffield City College which was highly commended in the sustainability category in the SCALA (Society of Chief Architects of Local Authorities) Awards 2011.

In 2015 the Practice commemorated the death of their founder, Bryan Jefferson, with a memorial concert organised by Music in the Round, titled Man of Concrete.

Since their Modernist and Brutalist beginnings, the Practice has continued to favour an aesthetic which balances form and function. The firm practices within the Housing, Education, Transport, Healthcare and Masterplanning sectors.

Among recent projects by the company are:

- John Clare's birthplace surroundings (2005)
- Beverley Campus as East Riding College (2016)
- Acre Mills Outpatients (2014)
- Hymers College Learning Resource Centre (2016)
- Manchester Transport Interchange Development (2006)
- Liverpool South Parkway Interchange (2007)
- The Soundhouse for the University of Sheffield (2009)
- Northumbria University Student Union (2011)
- South Cheshire College
- Waverley Steps upgrade in Edinburgh.
