= Loxley House =

House in Sheffield, England

Coordinates: 53.4087°N 1.5262°W

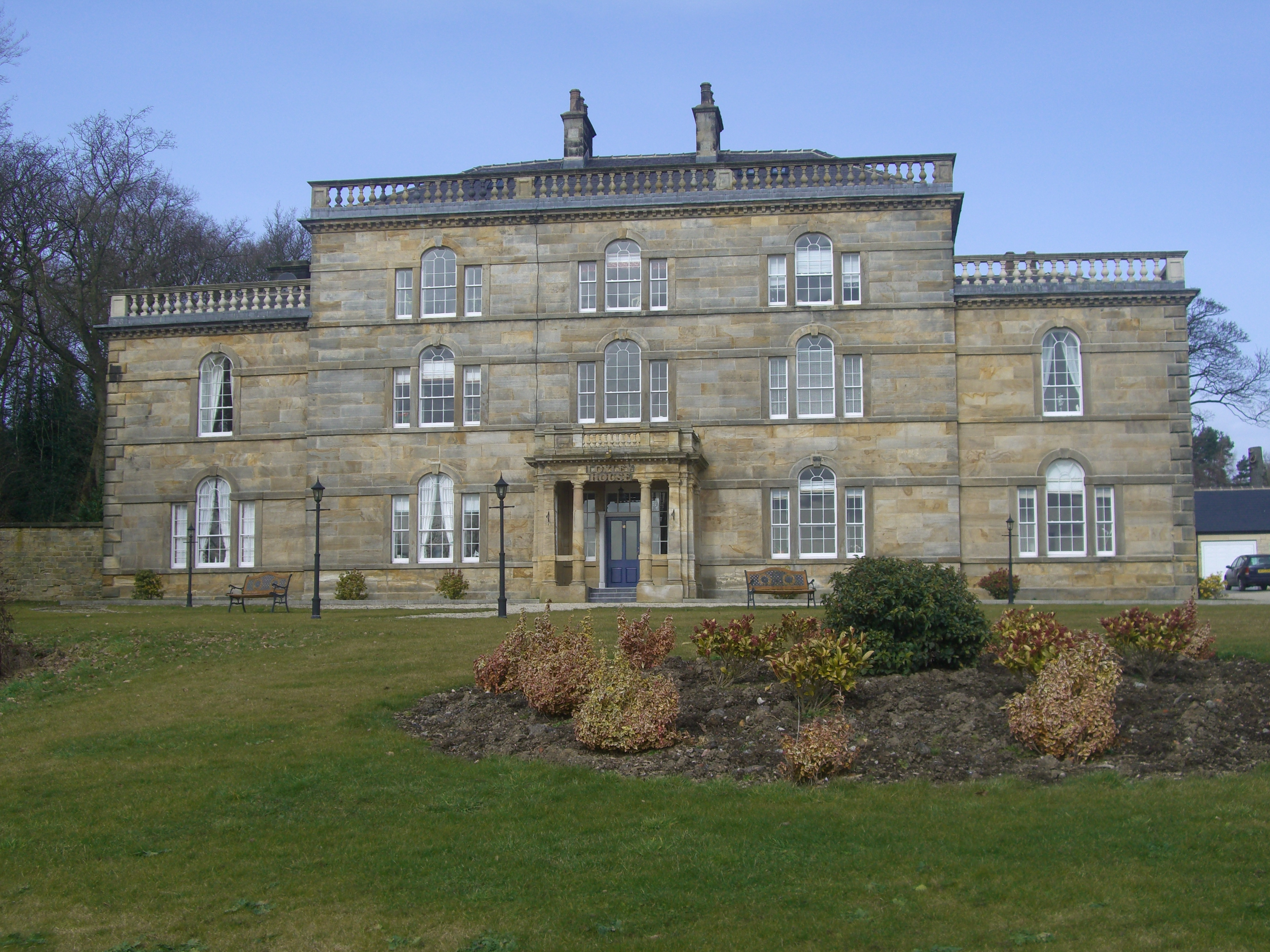
Loxley House.

Loxley House is a Georgian building situated off Ben Lane in the Wadsley area of Sheffield in South Yorkshire, England. It is a Grade Two Listed building.

== History ==
The present building was built in 1826 but the first house on the site was constructed in 1795 by the Reverend Thomas Halliday the Unitarian minister for Norton. This original structure was an imposing building which stood at the head of a drive which led off Ben Lane. Halliday was something of a local entrepreneur who would later construct the Robin Hood Inn at Little Matlock in Loxley in 1804. In 1808 Halliday sold the house to Thomas Payne and it was the Payne family who completely rebuilt it as Loxley House in 1826. The new house was much more impressive in style than the previous building having three storeys and three wide set bays as well as striking Venetian windows.

The house remained the property of the Payne family until 1895 with the last member of that family taking up residence in the 1860s. This was the eccentric Doctor Henry Payne who fell out with the local populace and vicar at the nearby Wadsley Parish Church over a right of way across Wadsley Common which was part of Dr. Payne's estate. So virulent was the dispute with the vicar that Payne said he would never go to church again and as a result was buried within the grounds of Loxley House without ceremony in an unmarked brick vault.

In 1895 Alderman William Clegg bought Loxley House, Clegg was something of a local celebrity having played football for Sheffield Wednesday in the 1870s, making two appearances for England. Clegg was leader of the Sheffield City Council for many years and became Lord Mayor of Sheffield in 1898. The house had two more tenants after William Clegg left until World War I when two spinster nieces of Dr. Payne were living there. That was the last time that the house was used as a private residence.

In 1919 the house was taken over by the Cripples Aid Association and later was used by the Sheffield Sea Cadet Corps as a base for many years. In 1996 the house was put up for sale and was bought by the property developers Campbell Homes who have turned it into luxury flats and apartments.
