= St Vincent's Church, Sheffield =

Former church and student accommodation in South Yorkshire, England

St Vincent's Church
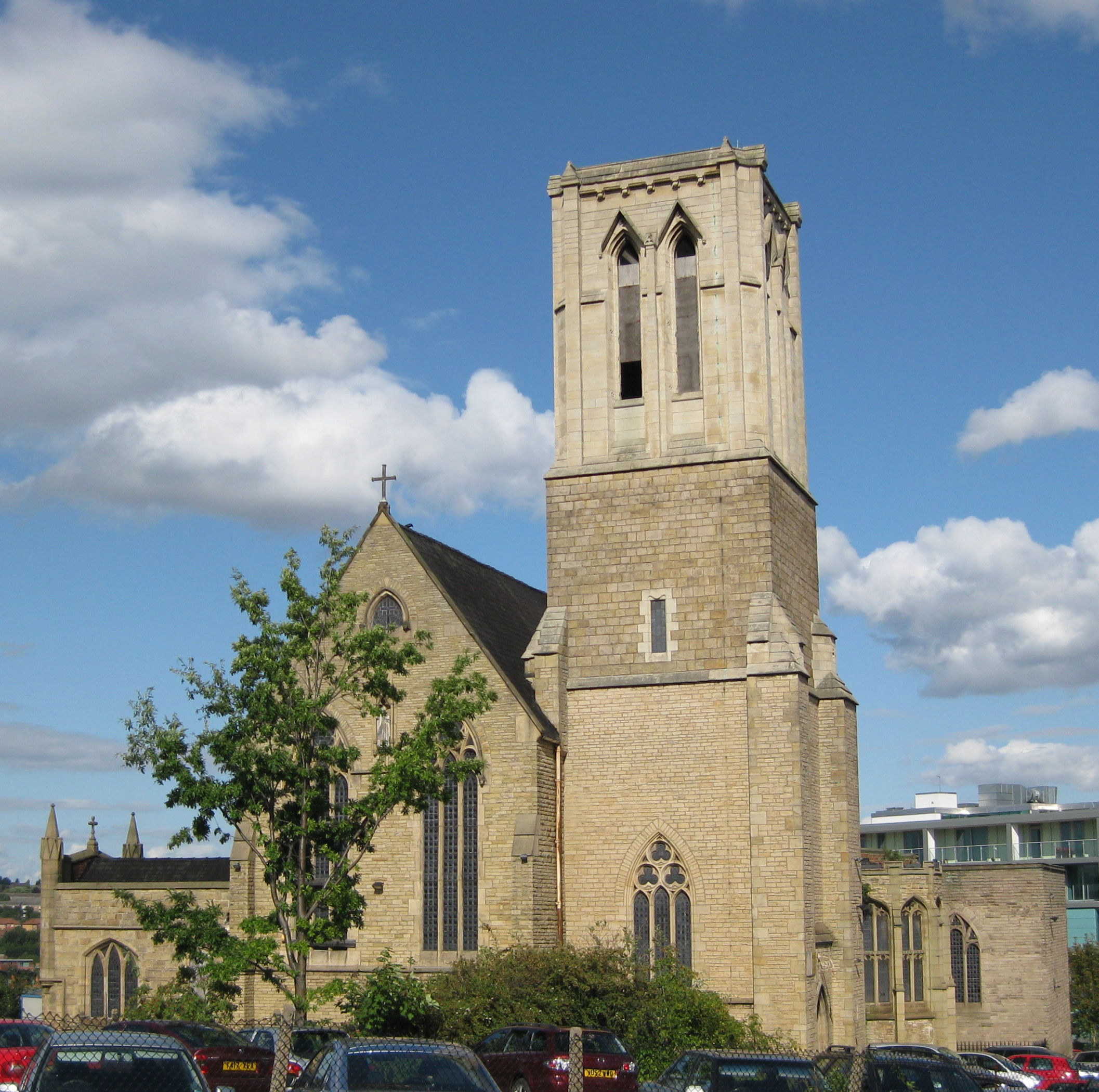
- St Vincent's Church in 2009
- St Vincent's Church
- 53.3846°N 1.4762°W
- OS grid reference: SK 34937 87654
- Location: Solly Street, Sheffield, South Yorkshire
- Country: England
- Denomination: Roman Catholic

History
- Status: Redundant
- Dedication: Saint Vincent de Paul

Architecture
- Functional status: Closed 1996; converted to student accommodation
- Architect(s): Matthew Ellison Hadfield, George Goldie, Charles Hadfield
- Architectural type: Church
- Style: Norman
- Groundbreaking: 1851
- Completed: 1853

St Vincent's Church is a former Roman Catholic church situated on Solly Street at its junction with Hollis Croft in the centre of the City of Sheffield, South Yorkshire, England. It stands within the St Vincent's Quarter of the city centre. Begun in 1851 and first completed as a chapel-school in 1853, it was designed by Matthew Ellison Hadfield and later enlarged by his partner George Goldie, with a Norman-style tower by Charles Hadfield rising to 93 feet (28 m).

Following its closure as a place of worship in 1996, the church and its surrounding site were redeveloped and now form part of St Vincent's Place, a student accommodation complex that opened in 2018.

== History ==
=== Irish emigration to Sheffield ===
As a result of the Great Famine of Ireland between the years of 1845 and 1849 many emigrants left Ireland to try to find a better life in England. The developing cutlery and tool industries of Sheffield attracted a number of the Irish emigrants, many of whom had walked the 80-mile (130 km) from disembarking at Liverpool Docks, over the Pennines, to settle in "The Crofts" area of the town. The Crofts was centred on Solly Street (then called Pea Croft) and at that time, along with nearby Netherthorpe, was one of the main areas of steel, cutlery, edge-tool and file making; an intensive hub of industries exporting renowned quality goods around the world. Like much of Sheffield at the time, it was a working-poor neighbourhood of crowded tenements and back to back housing, lacking adequate sanitation and healthcare, built across hills accessed by gennels and snickets, interspersed with the constantly active iron and steel factories, small workshops making cutlery and hand tools, and churches, schools and pubs.

=== Founding of St Vincent’s ===
The majority of the Irish immigrants in The Crofts were Roman Catholics and worshipped at the newly opened St Marie's church in Norfolk Row, the only Catholic church in Sheffield in the early 1850s. Father Edmund Scully of St Marie's pledged to build a school-chapel for The Crofts area and on Good Friday 1851 a plot of ground was purchased in the area for £700. Matthew Ellison Hadfield designed the chapel-school which was completed in July 1853 at a cost of £1,850.

St Vincent's in the 1930s, the original school-chapel on the right was destroyed in the Sheffield Blitz.

=== Chapel becomes a church ===
The chapel was greatly expanded in 1856 by George Goldie, a partner of Hadfield's, with the addition of a nave and a chancel at a cost of £3,100 and was officially recognised as a church although it had no tower or spire. Further building work costing £650 took place in 1870 when a church tower was built up to a height of 40 feet (12 m) which incorporated the south porch and an entrance from White Croft. The tower was raised up to its present-day height of 93 feet (28 m) in 1911 when a donation of £1,400 by Mr. Philip Wake enabled it to be completed in a design in the Norman style based on a typical church in Normandy. The architect of the new tower was Charles Hadfield and it was formally blessed and opened by Michael Logue Primate of All Ireland on 28 October 1911.

=== Inter-war years ===
1920 saw the division of St Vincent's parish with the creation of the Sacred Heart parish in the Hillsborough area of the city. The area around the church was still mostly slum housing with some crime, one of the gangs involved in the Sheffield Gang Wars of the mid-1920s was of Irish descent with most of its members from the St Vincent's parish. The Great Depression in the United Kingdom caused great hardship in the parish, it eventually resulted in a programme of slum clearances which began in 1929. Many acres of old properties were demolished in the parish and the residents moved to more spacious housing in the suburbs. The slum clearances continued up to 1938 when they were suspended because of the imminence of war. The actor Patrick McGoohan was a pupil at the school during this time.

=== Second World War ===
The first Sheffield Blitz raid by German bombers on the night of 12/13 December 1940 resulted in the destruction of the original 1853 chapel when a parachute mine landed on the roof. The original girls' school was also destroyed and every window in the church was blown out destroying some valuable stained glass windows. The newer part of the church from 1911 escaped serious damage.

=== Post-war and present day ===
Vigorous fund raising enabled much re-building to be done on the damaged church in the 1950s, this included a new chapel, replacement roofs and a new entrance porch, organ loft and choir gallery.

Due to the war damage and continuing slum clearances in the post-war St Vincent's area, the church lost much of its congregation as the district was rebuilt as a business area. By 1989 the presbytery and the school were both closed. Many of the remaining church members now lived in the Walkley / Crookes areas of Sheffield, and around this time fundraising began for a new more conveniently situated church building. The old church building in the Crofts finally closed as a place of worship in 1996. Fundraising for a new building continued; St Vincent's Church, Crookes eventually opened in May 2001.

The old church remained empty for many years; it was used for a time by the St Vincent de Paul Society for storage of furniture. The surrounding land was operated by St Vincent's parish as a commercial car park. After closing the church fell into a worsening state of disrepair. Eventually the majority of the site was purchased by Unite Students, who submitted a planning application for student accommodation in 2016. The redevelopment was completed as St Vincent's Place, and the first students took up residence in September 2018. The site now operates exclusively as Unite Students accommodation, with the former church building retained and converted into a communal area for residents, incorporating shared social space, a cinema, a kitchen and soundproofed music rooms.

The old school building initially remained in the ownership of St Vincent's parish. In 2017 the parish gifted the building to Mission Hub Sheffield, an Evangelical Catholic organisation. Renovation of the school building was completed by 2019. The school building is also used by the Catholic chaplaincy of the University of Sheffield.

== See also ==
- St Michael's Cemetery, Sheffield
