= Underbank Chapel =

Church in Sheffield, England

Coordinates: 53.394135°N 1.556025°W

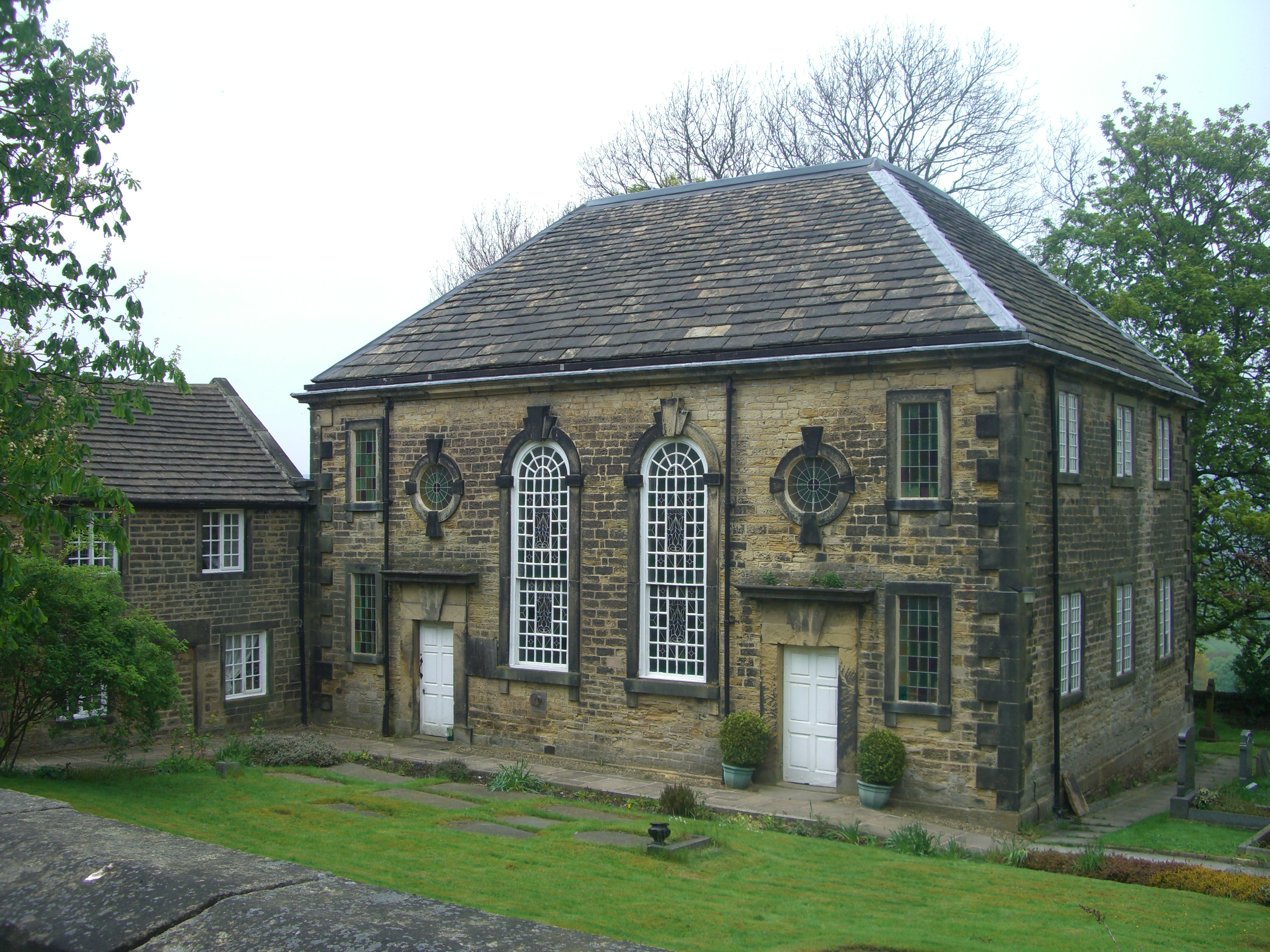

Underbank Chapel is a Unitarian place of worship in Stannington, a suburb of Sheffield, South Yorkshire. It is a member of the General Assembly of Unitarian and Free Christian Churches, the umbrella organisation for British Unitarians.

It stands in a rural situation, 4 miles [6 km] west of the city centre on Stannington Road overlooking the Loxley Valley. The building is Grade II listed.

Underbank Schoolroom, which is closely associated with the chapel, stands 55 yards [50 m] to the south-west and is also a Grade II listed building.

== History ==
The congregation dates its founding to 1652, when it first began to meet in a converted barn on an adjoining site. This was established when Richard Spoone left land and a building in his will to establish a “preaching minister”. As the chapel was founded during the Commonwealth of England, the minister was of the Presbyterian denomination. The setting up of this chapel of ease allowed the people of the Stannington district to worship locally for the first time, as prior to this the nearest church was the Church of St Nicholas at High Bradfield, some five km away. By about 1700 they counted themselves Dissenters.

By the year 1740 the original chapel had become unfit for use and Thomas Marriott of Ughill, a local Calvanistic dissenter, built the present day chapel on a nearby plot of land he had purchased for the purpose. The chapel was opened on 2 June 1743 by Mr. Wadsworth, Mr. Samuel Smith and three or four ministers, one of whom had come from Doncaster.

In 1785 the chapel embraced Unitarian beliefs when Reverend Edmund Gibson became minister. Many of the congregation could not accept Unitarianism and left the church, either returning to St. Nicholas or attending the newly opened Congregational church on Queen Street in the centre of Sheffield. In 1796 Underbank was visited by Samuel Taylor Coleridge, who at that time was considering becoming a Unitarian minister; he met the chapel's minister, the Reverend Astley Meanley.

== Architecture ==
Underbank Chapel is generally considered as being a distinctive and interesting example of its type as an eighteenth-century Dissenters' meeting house. It was chosen as the cover photograph for The Unitarian Heritage: An Architectural Survey of Chapels and Churches in the Unitarian Tradition in the British Isles. The book describes it as "an extremely sophisticated design" by an unknown person.

=== Exterior ===
The chapel is constructed from coarse, squared sandstone with ashlar dressings. The roof is hipped and consists of stone slates with the flat central section being of lead. The front (south facing) side of the chapel features distinctive windows: two very tall round-headed ones with multiple small panes, and decoratively keyed oculus ones above both doors. The chapel originally had separate entrance doors for men and women, and although both are still in situ, only the right hand one is now used.

=== Interior ===
The north wall features two stained glass windows, one of which depicts St. Mark as the winged lion and Saint Matthew as a winged man. The other depictsJesus welcoming the children.

The interior of the Chapel underwent alteration during the 19th and 20thC. Fixed pews were added in 1860. Originally there were two long side balconies, necessary to accommodate the large numbers attending the services, these were later removed, with only a balcony on the east wall at the rear of the chapel now remaining. 1952 saw a major refurbishment, with the removal of two pews to make way for a vestry and panelling added. At the same time the pulpit was moved into a more central location, exchanging positions with the organ, which is now situated in the north-western corner, a faint outline of where the original pulpit stood can still be seen. The organ itself is a Brindley & Foster pipe organ which was purchased second-hand in memorial of Chapel members lost in World War I. The chapel now seats approximately 110 people downstairs, plus 50 to 70 in the gallery.

In 2002 Chapel members created a commemorative wall-hanging for the 350th anniversary of the founding of the original chapel, incorporating different panels representing Chapel life since 1652 around a central tapestry showing the building's current exterior. It is displayed on the chapel's the west wall, near the Pulpit.

== Underbank Schoolroom ==
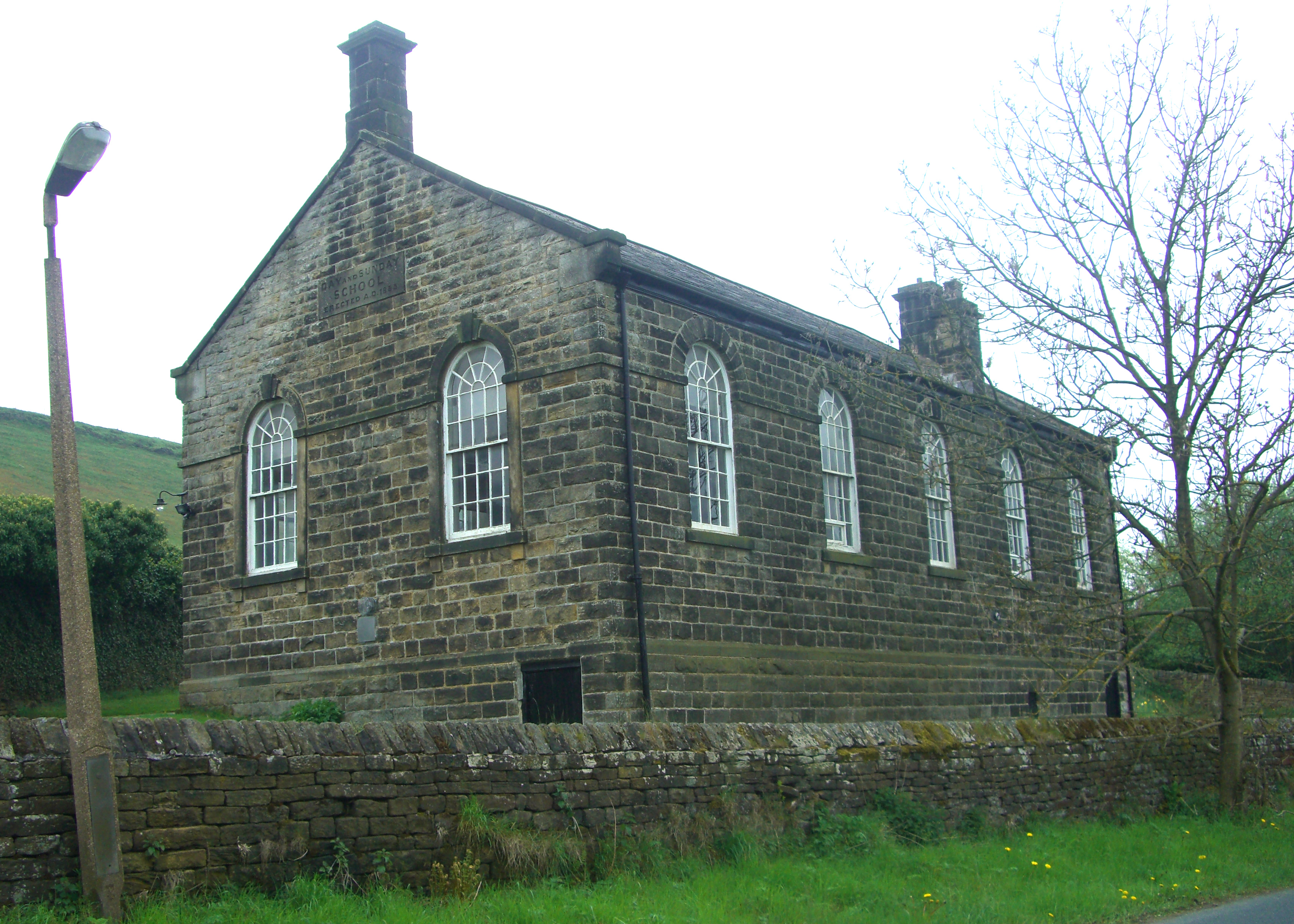
The Schoolroom

Underbank Schoolroom stands 55 yards [50 m] to the south-west of the chapel, at the junction of Stannington Road, Riggs Low Road and Stopes Road.

=== History ===
The original school building was established in similar circumstances to the chapel when Richard Spoone, a local landowner, left a property called Sim House in his will dated 23 May 1652, to provide “for the education of poor children whose parents are willing but unable to keep them in school”. Ralph Wood, the minister of the chapel, was the first schoolmaster, paid seventeen shillings and sixpence a quarter. In February 1844 George Revitt, aged 21, was appointed master by the trustees, being paid an annual salary of £20. He remained master for 31 years, and under him the school prospered. The trustees began to look for a site for a larger school; however in the end it was decided to demolish the old school and build the new one on the same site.

Construction of the new school was completed in 1853 and it opened on 8 May 1854. It cost between £500 and £600 to construct: the trustees contributed £100, as did the Sunday school, and there was a contribution from the Bingley House trust, but this left a considerable balance still to be repaid. It took 31 years to clear the debt, with a public subscriptions list being started which raised £270. The balance was finally paid in April 1885 by the proceeds of a bazaar at Channing Hall, linked to Upper Chapel in Sheffield.

In September 1910, the school was taken over by the County Council and it was announced that the school would close on 31 July 1911. The pupils were moved to the new and more centrally located Stannington Council School (Infants Department) with Underbank's headmistress Mrs. Payne becoming head of the new school.

=== Architecture ===
The building is constructed from rock faced gritstone with a Welsh slate roof. It consists of a single storey with a basement; the windows are tall, round headed with multiple small panes. A central plaque on the upper outer east wall reads: “Day and Sunday School erected A.D. 1853.”
