= Loxley United Reformed Church =

Church building in Sheffield, England

Coordinates: 53.407460°N 1.545729°W

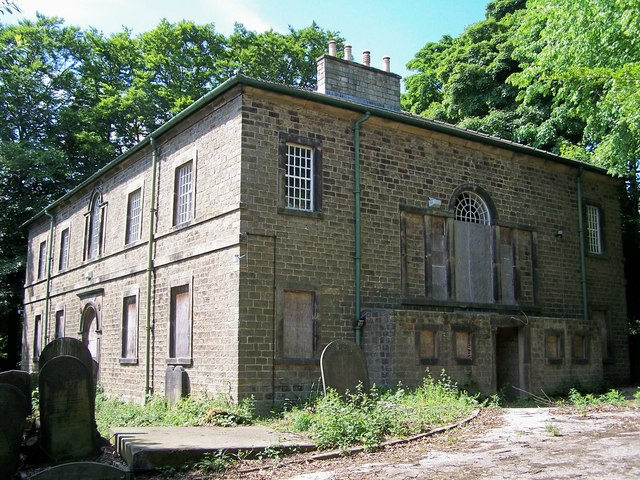
The church in 2008

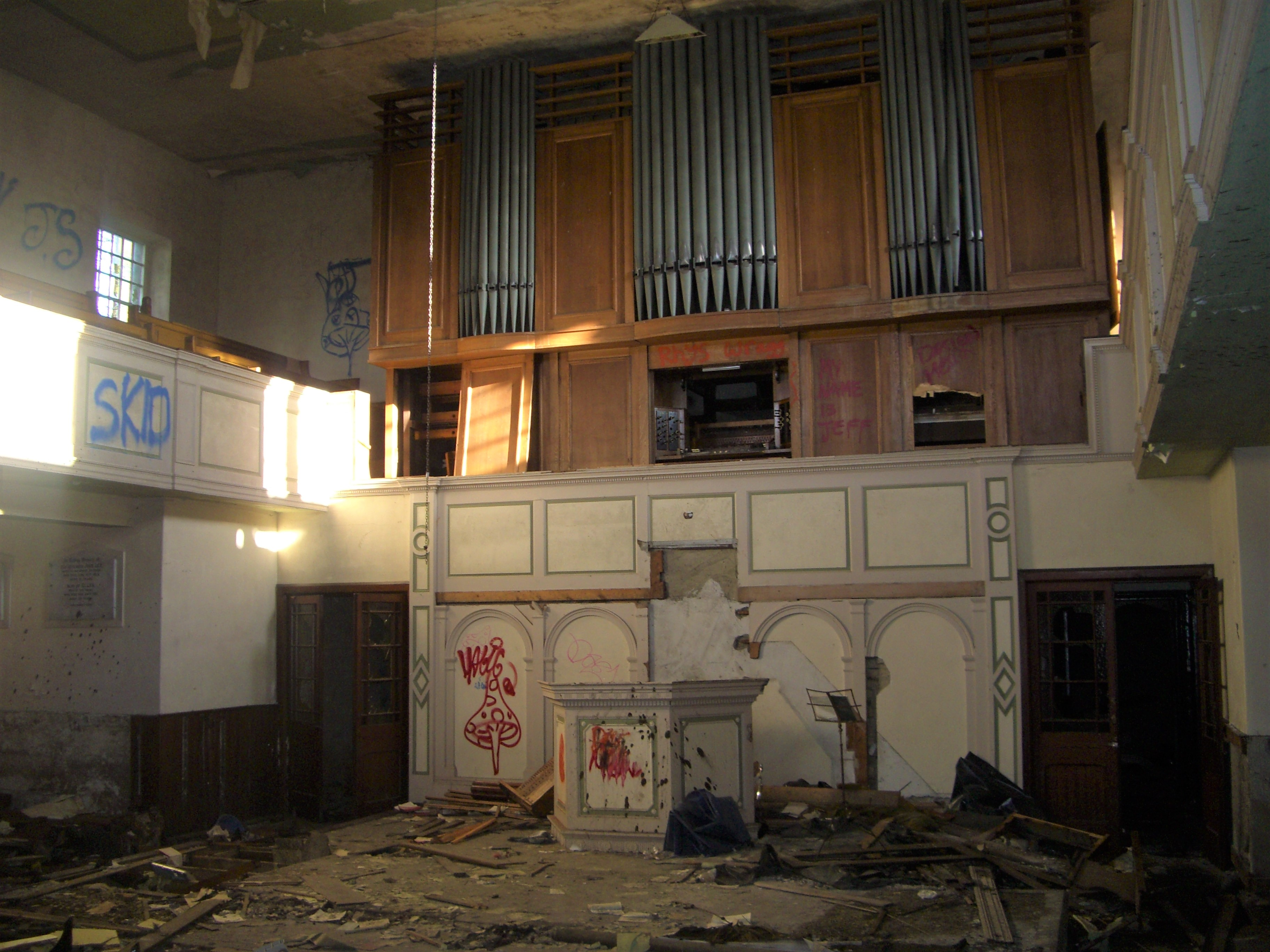
The vandalised interior in early 2016, before the fire, showing the original organ

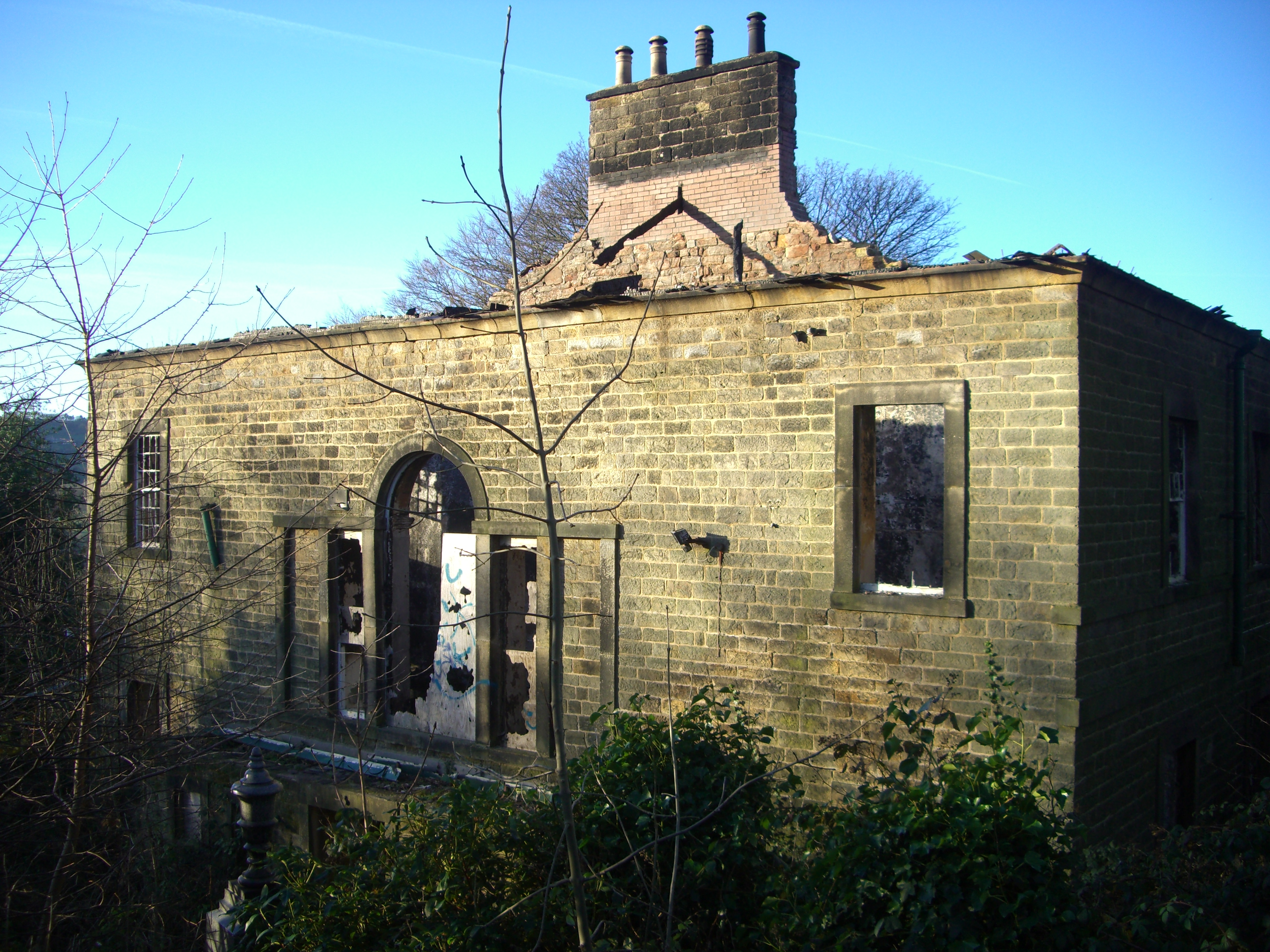
The east side of the church in early 2017, showing fire damage and missing roof.

Loxley United Reformed Church is a derelict Grade II* listed building located on Loxley Road in Loxley, a western suburb of the City of Sheffield, England. It is currently in a fire damaged state.

== History ==
The building was originally known as the Loxley Congregational Chapel and was constructed in 1787 at a cost of £1,000 by some of the worshippers at the Church of St Nicholas, Bradfield. It was built for the curate at St Nicholas’ Benjamin Greaves who was about to be dismissed and his parishioners wanted him to stay in the area. Upon completion the chapel, which was set back 100 metres from Loxley Road had the look of a large house constructed from squared gritstone with Venetian windows. The local Bishop was asked to consecrate the building upon its opening but refused because it did not have an east window. In its early years the church was utilised as an Anglican place of worship with Benjamin Greaves continuing to preach until he was appointed to a new post at Stoney Middleton. Mr Greaves was succeeded by a Church of England minister, the Reverend Flockton. By 1798 the building was being rented by Protestant Dissenters or Independents and they changed its name to The Loxley Independent Church when they bought the building outright. In 1802 the Independents appointed their first minister Daniel Dunkerley, who was incumbent for 18 years until his death, he was buried in the churchyard.

David Dunkerley was the next minister, he was no relation to Daniel, remaining until he emigrated to Canada in 1830. Reverend Cullen (1830-1836) was succeeded by the Reverend John Hanson, known as the "Vicar of Loxley", who was minister for 18 years. Thomas France was minister for 35 years (1854-1889) eventually dying in November 1898, aged 83. Parishioners placed a remembrance tablet to him in the church. According to the Religious Census of 1851 an average congregation at an afternoon service was 200 people. A new school-room and minister's house was built in 1855, the first stone being laid on 30 April by Alderman Francis Hoole, Esq. former Lord Mayor of Sheffield. Many victims of the Great Sheffield Flood of 1864 were interred in the churchyard including members of the Armitage, Bower, Crownshaw, Denton, Bates, Hudson and Chapman families. In 1872 Henry Tingle Wilde, Chief Officer of the RMS Titanic was christened at the church. In the 1970s the name of the church was changed again to the Loxley United Reformed Church due to the formation of the United Reformed Church in 1972.

=== Modern times and 2016 fire ===
The church closed in 1993 with the building gradually deteriorating into a ruinous state over the years. The churchyard which surrounds the church on three sides became overgrown. Despite efforts to keep the interior secure, people broke into the church and caused substantial vandalism. In the early hours of 17 August 2016 the church caught fire and was severely damaged by the flames. The fire was attended by three fire engines and was put out within hours, however the building was completely gutted, losing its roof and first floor and all its fitments, it still stands open to the elements with trees beginning to spring up in what was once the ground floor as of October 2023 with no plans of renovation, restoration or demolition currently in place.
