= Walkley Library =

Public library in Walkley, Sheffield, England

Coordinates: 53.394935°N 1.503056°W

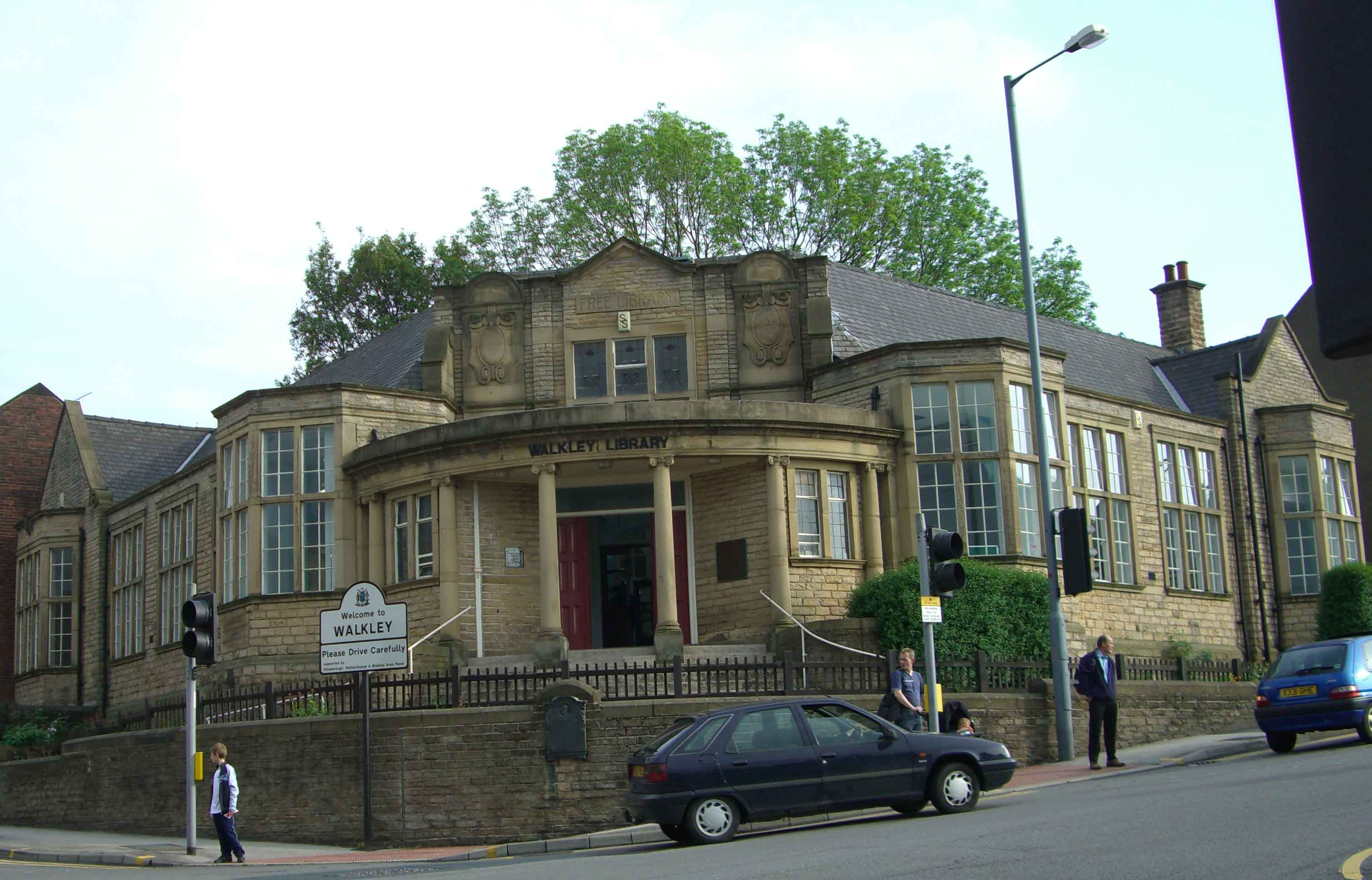

Walkley Library is a public lending library in Walkley, a suburb of the City of Sheffield in England. It stands at the junction of Walkley Road and South Road in one of the busiest parts of the area. It is one of 27 suburban branch libraries within the city. The building is a Carnegie library, the only library in Sheffield to receive Carnegie funding, it is also a Grade II listed building as are the boundary walls and commemorative plaque in front of the library.

== History ==
Construction of the library began in August 1904 to serve the growing population of Walkley, the suburb had become a popular area with commuters with the arrival of the Sheffield Tramway in the early 1900s. The city's Libraries and Museums Committee were lobbied by various local dignitaries to build a library and the search for a suitable site began. Moor End on Commonside was considered but was deemed unsuitable for a library, in the end, William Craven, an insurance agent from Industry Street found five old cottages at the corner of South Road and Walkley Road which were for sale. Sheffield Corporation paid £1,500 for the land to the owner Mr. William Addy Hall.

Local Liberal Councillor J.W. Crowther had the task of supervising the building of the library without incurring any cost to local tax payers and he approached Andrew Carnegie, the Scottish American steel magnate who had set up a fund to cover the cost of new libraries. Carnegie agreed to provide £3,500 in two stages for the construction of the library with the proviso that Sheffield Libraries Committee consented to spend no less than £230 per annum on its upkeep. Local architects were invited to submit plans for the new library that would not only be within the £3,500 budget but also correspond with the specifications drawn up by the Sheffield City Surveyor. These specifications included an entrance hall with drinking fountain, separate reading rooms for men and women and a lending library and rooms for the librarian and the committee.

The submitted plans were judged by the renowned London architect William Emerson. The winner was Henry Leslie Paterson of the architects Hemsoll & Paterson of Bank Street, Sheffield. Paterson had previously designed many buildings for the council including Upperthorpe and Morley Street Schools. The building contractor was Daniel O’Neil of Scotland Street and the foundation stone was laid on August 9, 1904, by Alderman Brittain. The building was complete at the end of 1905 after 16 months of work and was opened by the Lord Mayor of Sheffield Herbert Hughes. Councillor Crowther died in 1916 and a commemorative plaque was placed in his honour on the boundary wall in front of the library in 1927. On November 3, 1924, a junior section was added to the library in what had been the women's reading room. The building had internal alterations in 1954 which included the relocation of the junior library to the former men's reading room and the demolition of an internal wall enabled the main lending library to be extended.

=== Walkley Library Action Group (WLAG) ===
This group was set up in 1992 after it was rumoured that the library was to be closed by Sheffield City Council. In the end the library remained open although six branch libraries did close in the city in 1995. The group's aims are to help maintain a library service in Walkley, to support improvements to the library service, to encourage the provision of a wide range of activities which will extend the use and popularity of the library service and building and to help maintain and improve the unique Walkley Library building. The group lobbied for and gained listed building status for the building from English Heritage in February 1993.

=== Walkley Against Library Closures ===
In 2013 library closures are once again on Sheffield City Council's agenda. In September 2013 Walkley Library was identified as one of 15 city libraries slated for closure in the Sheffield City Council library review. A campaign group called Walkley Against Library Closures (WALC) formed in February 2013 to fight the closure of all city public libraries including Walkley.

=== Walkley Community Library Futures Group ===
Walkley Community Library Futures Group (WCLFG) was a group formed by local residents to examine options for running Walkley Library as a community endeavour, given the withdrawal of public funding. They submitted a draft business plan in January 2014 which was accepted, then submitting an Associate Library business plan in July 2014. A bid was also submitted by The Forum Cafe' Bars Ltd. Both bids were accepted by Sheffield City Council, who suggested that the parties work together to create a combined library and cafe bar facility.

=== Walkley Carnegie Library ===
Walkley Carnegie Library was formed by local residents, including members of WCLFG, to run the library after it was handed over by Sheffield City Council on November 17, 2014. Although the original intention was to develop a combined library and cafe (with Forum Cafe' Bars Ltd, subsequently renamed True North Brew Co Ltd), this has not come to fruition as the proposed partnership ended in 2018.

== Architecture ==
The building consists of two wings and is in the Tudor Revival style with the stone for the external walls being quarried locally at the Bole Hills quarry at Crookes with the smooth dressing stone around the entrance and windows coming from Stoke Hall at Calver. The building originally had a small ornamental wooden cupola over the entrance hall but this was removed in 1956 after it was deemed to be unsafe. The building is small but quite striking with its large bay windows and distinctive entrance which consists of a portico with six Ionic columns with a curving staircase leading to it.
