= Revell Grange =

Country house in Stannington, South Yorkshire, England

Coordinates: 53.386022°N 1.562737°W

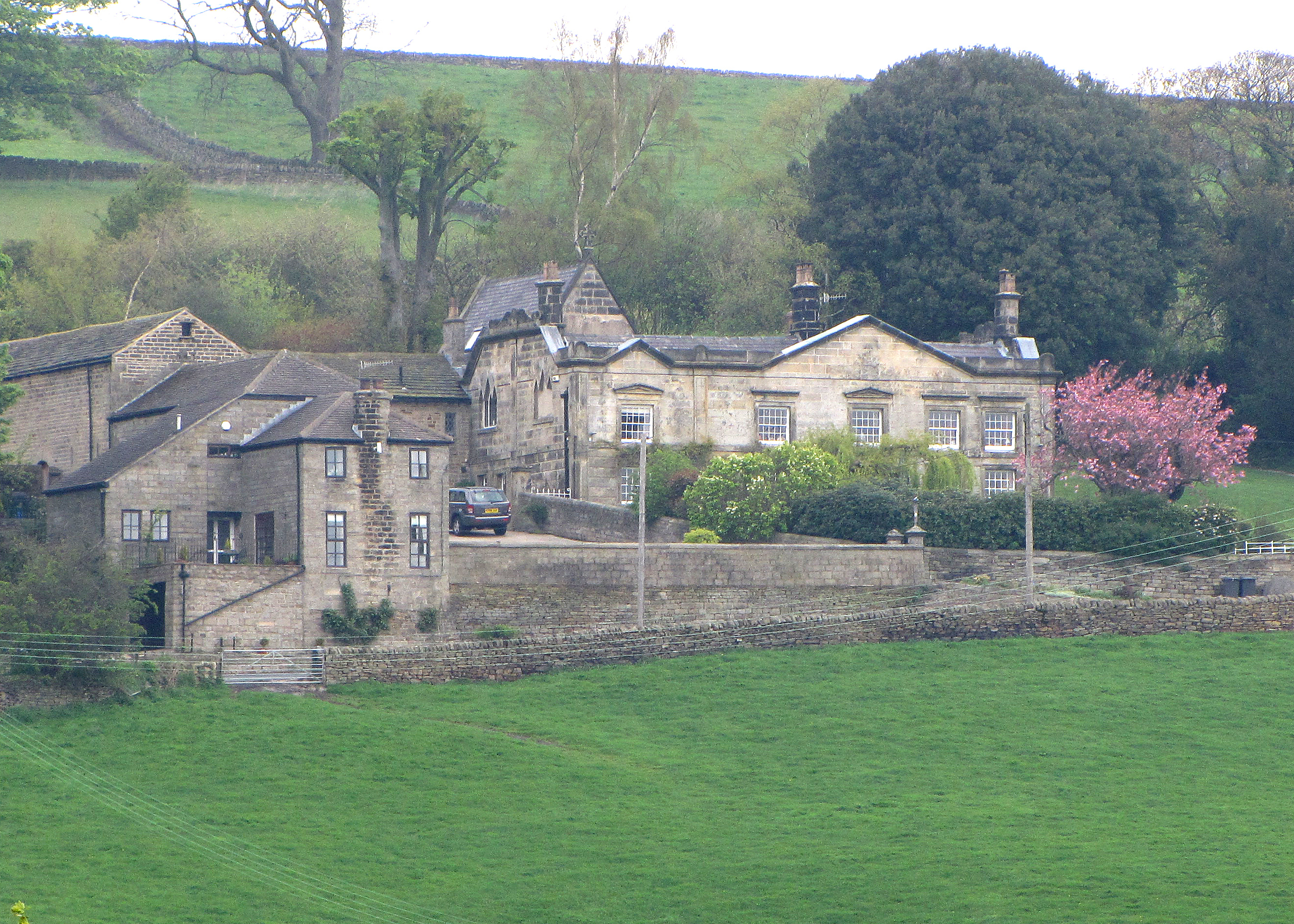
Revell Grange with the outbuildings including Revell Grange Cottage to the left.

Revell Grange is a Grade II listed English country house situated on Bingley Lane in the suburb of Stannington overlooking the Rivelin valley within the City of Sheffield, England. The house played an important role as a focal point of early Catholicism within the city and still houses a private chapel to this day.

== History ==
The original house is thought to date from 1495 but was considerably altered in the middle part of the 18th century with a new frontage and refacing added to the earlier core. The Revell family moved to the house in 1742, although they had previously lived at Nethergate Hall, one mile to the east in the centre of what is now Stannington village. The family remained at the Grange until the mid-1950s but due to the failure of the direct male line, it continued there under the names of Broomhead, Wright and then Sutton. The Revells were Roman Catholics and built a chapel at the Grange when they first occupied it for their own use and the small surrounding congregation. The chapel was used for Mass until February 1828 when it was closed by the Right Reverend Thomas Smith because of a shortage of priests and a dwindling congregation.

After the widowed Mistress Wright had re-married Mr. Sutton in 1854, it was agreed that the chapel should be reopened and on 17 December of that year, Father Burke of St Vincent's Church, Sheffield conducted Mass for the first time in almost 27 years and he revived the tradition of flying a white sheet as a signal to the local populace that Mass was to be celebrated in the Grange. In 1858, a new chapel was built on the site of the old one and was opened by John Briggs Bishop of Beverley and was dedicated to St Mary of the Assumption. Revell Grange continued to be occupied by the Sutton family until 1954 when the last descendant, Captain Revell Sutton, died. Today the Grange continues as a private house. The Grange has adjacent outbuildings which were constructed in the late 18th or early 19th century, these consist of a barn and a coach house which has been converted into a cottage. Both outbuildings are grade two listed.

== Architecture ==
The Grange is constructed from ashlar Gritstone with a Welsh slate roof. It consists of two storeys with five bays, the ten windows to the front of the house are 20 paned sashes. The chapel stands in the west wing of the Grange, it is higher than the main house and features Gothic detail, in contrast to the classical character of the main house.
