= Hillsborough Primary School =

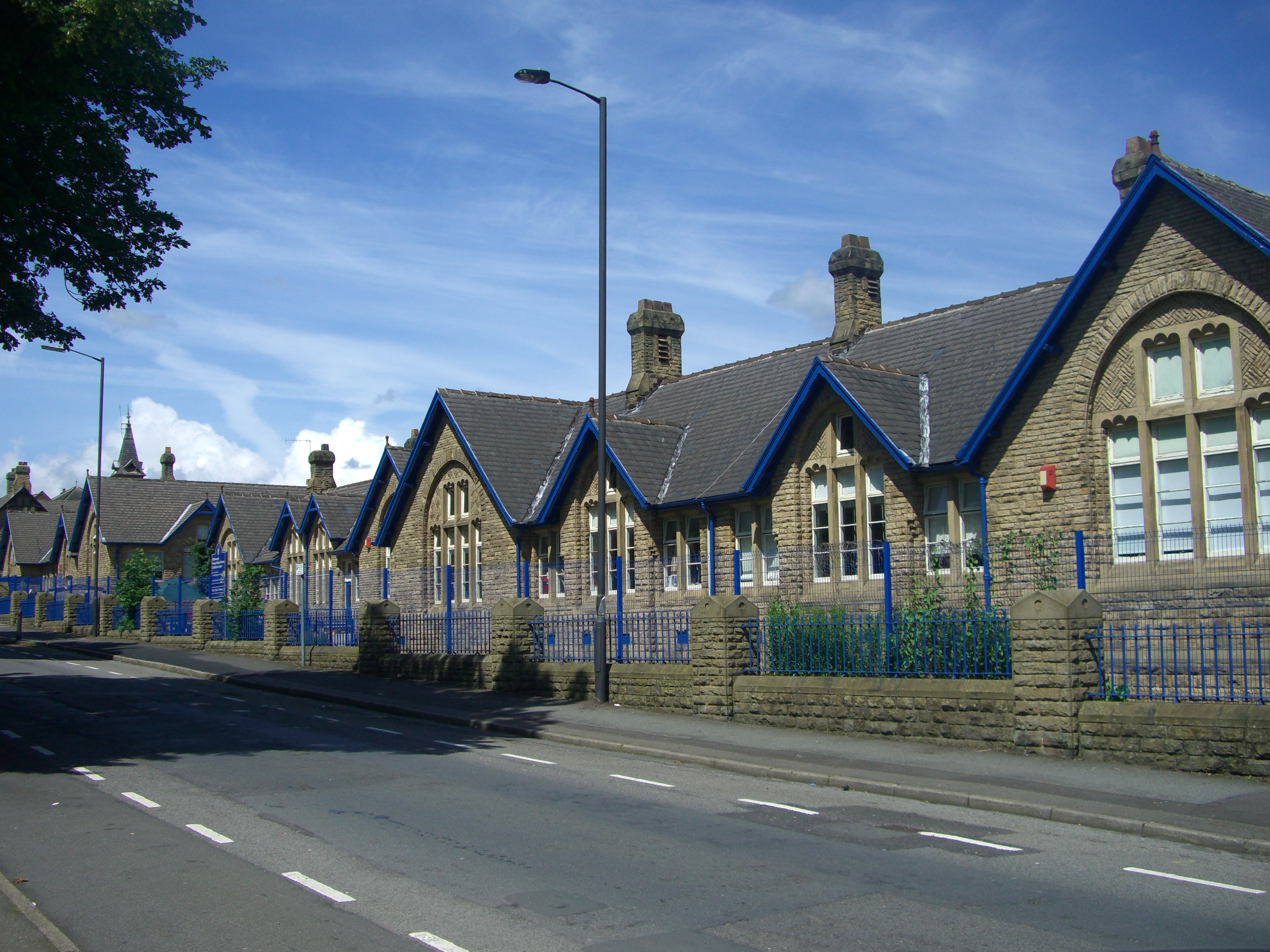

Location
- Parkside Road; Sheffield, South Yorkshire, S6 2AA; England; 53.410541°N 1.503461°W

Information
- Type: Academy
- Motto: ‘Growing together, learning together’
- Established: 1884
- Department for Education URN: 140310 Tables
- Ofsted: Reports
- Chair: J. Burkinshaw
- Head teacher: Nicola Wileman
- Gender: Mixed
- Age: 3 to 11
- Public transport: Y Leppings Lane
- Website: http://www.hillsborough.sheffield.sch.uk

Hillsborough Primary School is situated on Parkside Road in the suburb of Hillsborough in the City of Sheffield, England. The school caters for children between the ages of three and eleven. The building itself dates from 1884 and is a Grade II listed building.

== History ==
Hillsborough School was constructed by the architects Wilson & Masters. At the time of construction, the Hillsborough area was a rural location outside the City of Sheffield and within the parish of Ecclesfield so it fell to the Ecclesfield School Board to instigate the building of a school for the area. The Board borrowed £5,745 from the Public Works Loan Commissioners to build the school. Hillsborough Board School, as it was then known, was opened on 7 July 1884 by George Dawson, Chairman of the School Board, it had a department for older children as well as an infants section. By October 1886 there were 431 pupils in the school and in March 1892, a separate department for the older girls was created. The school became within the jurisdiction of Sheffield Council on 1 November 1901 when the boundaries of the city were extended, encompassing the Hillsborough area, at this time the school name was changed to Hillsborough Council School and there were over 600 pupils. In 1958 the school lost its senior section when the older pupils were transferred to the newly built Chaucer School and Hillsborough became solely a junior school. In October 1982 a nursery was opened on the site.

== Architecture ==
The school consists of one storey and is constructed in the Gothic Revival style from coursed squared stone with ashlars dressings and a slate roof, with diagonal nogging over the windows. The three symmetrical blocks which front onto Parkside Road are linked by corridors constructed in the mid 1900s. The closest of these blocks to the junction with Middlewood Road has on its roof a square wooden bell turret with swept pyramidal spire and finial. The stone boundary wall which runs round the perimeter of the school is also a listed structure.
