= Birley Old Hall =

Country house in South Yorkshire, England

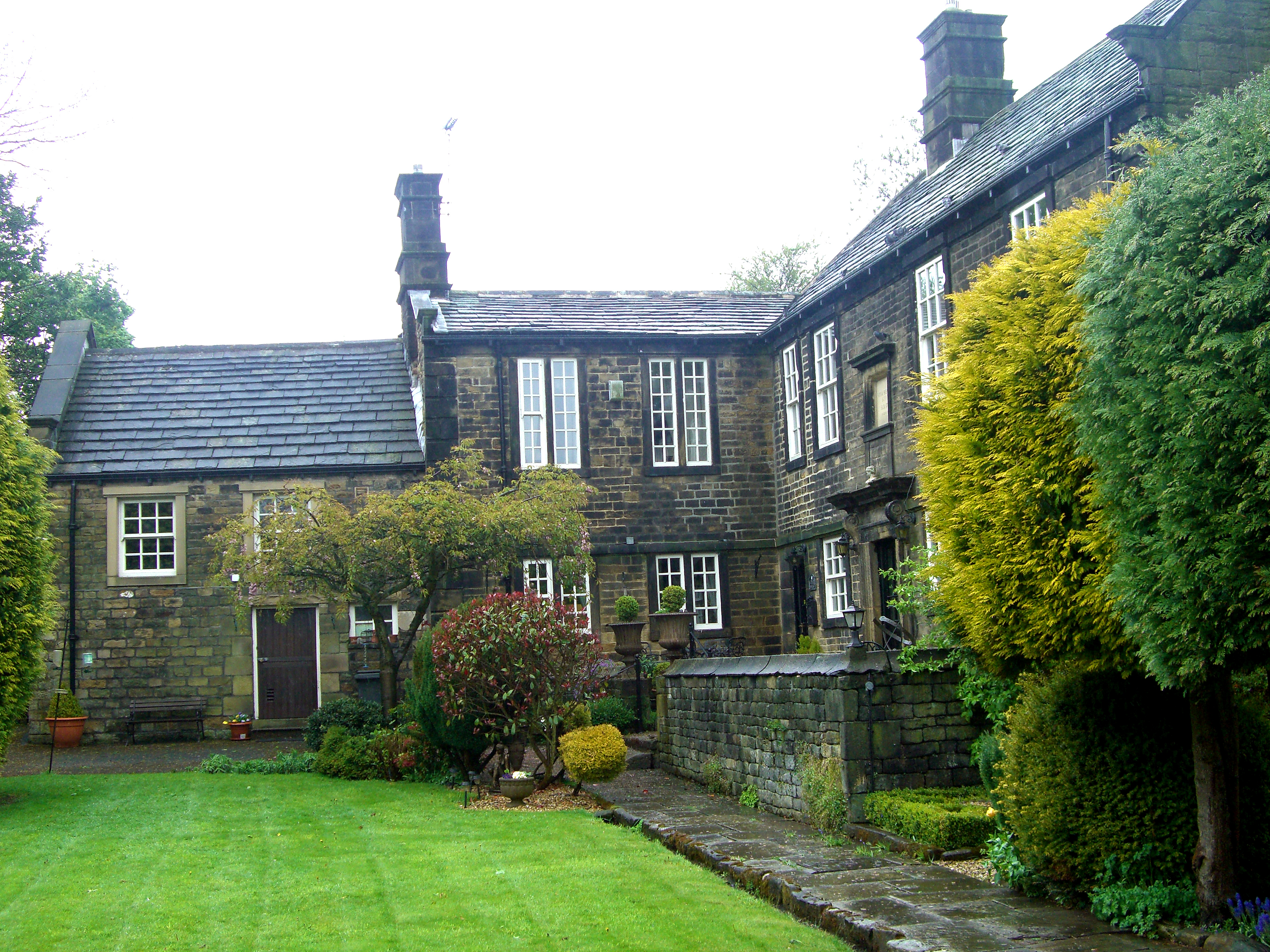
- Birley Old Hall

- Location within Sheffield
- 53.430472°N 1.50455°W
- Location: Ecclesfield, Sheffield

Listed Building – Grade II
- Official name: Birley Old Hall
- Designated: 1 May 1952
- Reference no.: 1254591

Birley Old Hall is a small English country house in the Birley Edge area of the City of Sheffield, England. The hall stands in an exposed situation at almost 200 metres (660 ft) above sea level on Edge Lane, some 6 kilometres (3.7 mi) north-west of the city centre. It has been designated a Grade II listed building by Historic England, as has The Falconry, a pavilion in the garden.

== History ==
The hall was constructed in two phases. The easterly-facing wing was constructed in the Late Middle Ages, when it was known as "Byrlay Edge". It was built with an oak cruck frame with an exterior of squared stone. Part of the cruck frame can be seen on the Edge Lane side of the original wing. In 1705, J. Carr added a new and more impressive south-facing wing at right angles to the original. The 1705 extension has been described as having "restrained elegance" and included the construction of a gazebo in the garden, called the Falconry. The hall underwent some alterations and additions during the late 18th and mid-19th centuries, including a two-storey addition to the original wing.

The hall was used briefly as a youth hostel in the 1940s and was purchased by Sheffield City Council after World War II. In 1959 the council leased the building to the steel manufacturers Daniel Doncaster and Sons as offices, and the hall was extensively restored. The hall and Birley Edge lost much of its rural isolation in the 1960s when the Fox Hill council housing estate was constructed on land to the immediate south. The hall returned to use as a private dwelling in the early 1980s and once more was totally restored during its conversion back to residential use. The interior of the house has features such as large fireplaces dating from the 1600s, along with exposed original stonework in one of the lounges and larger bedrooms.

== Architecture ==
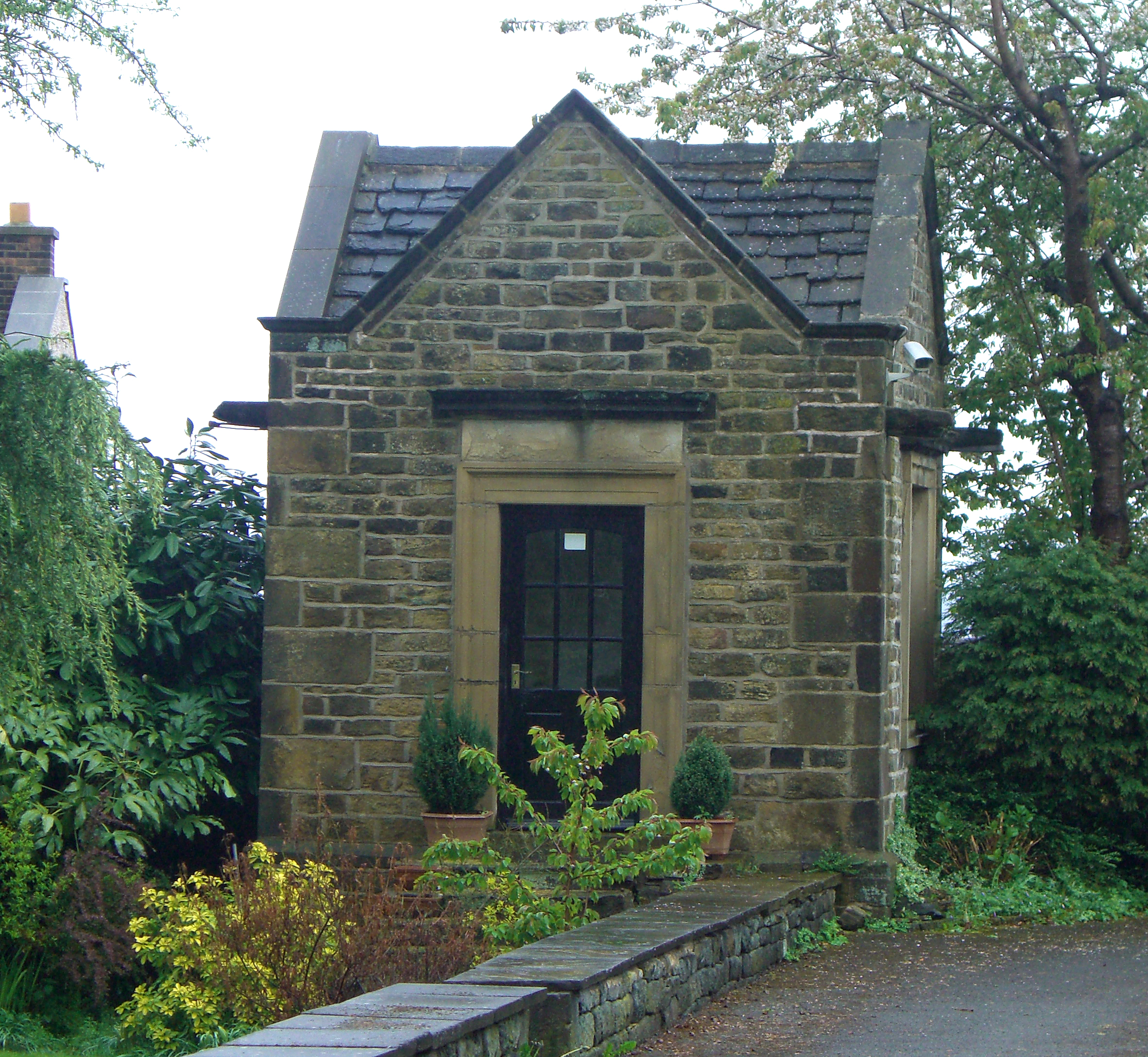
The Falconry

The hall is constructed from locally quarried squared stone and is L-shaped; the 1705 building has a coped datestone above the main door with the inscriptions "JC 1705" and "DD 1959". The roofs are gabled and hipped. The building has a mixture of mullioned, sash and casement windows. The Falconry, an early-18th-century garden pavilion, is built of squared dressed stone with ashlar dressings.
