= Fair House Farmhouse =

Farmhouse in Bradfield, Sheffield, England

Coordinates: 53.4227°N 1.6098°W

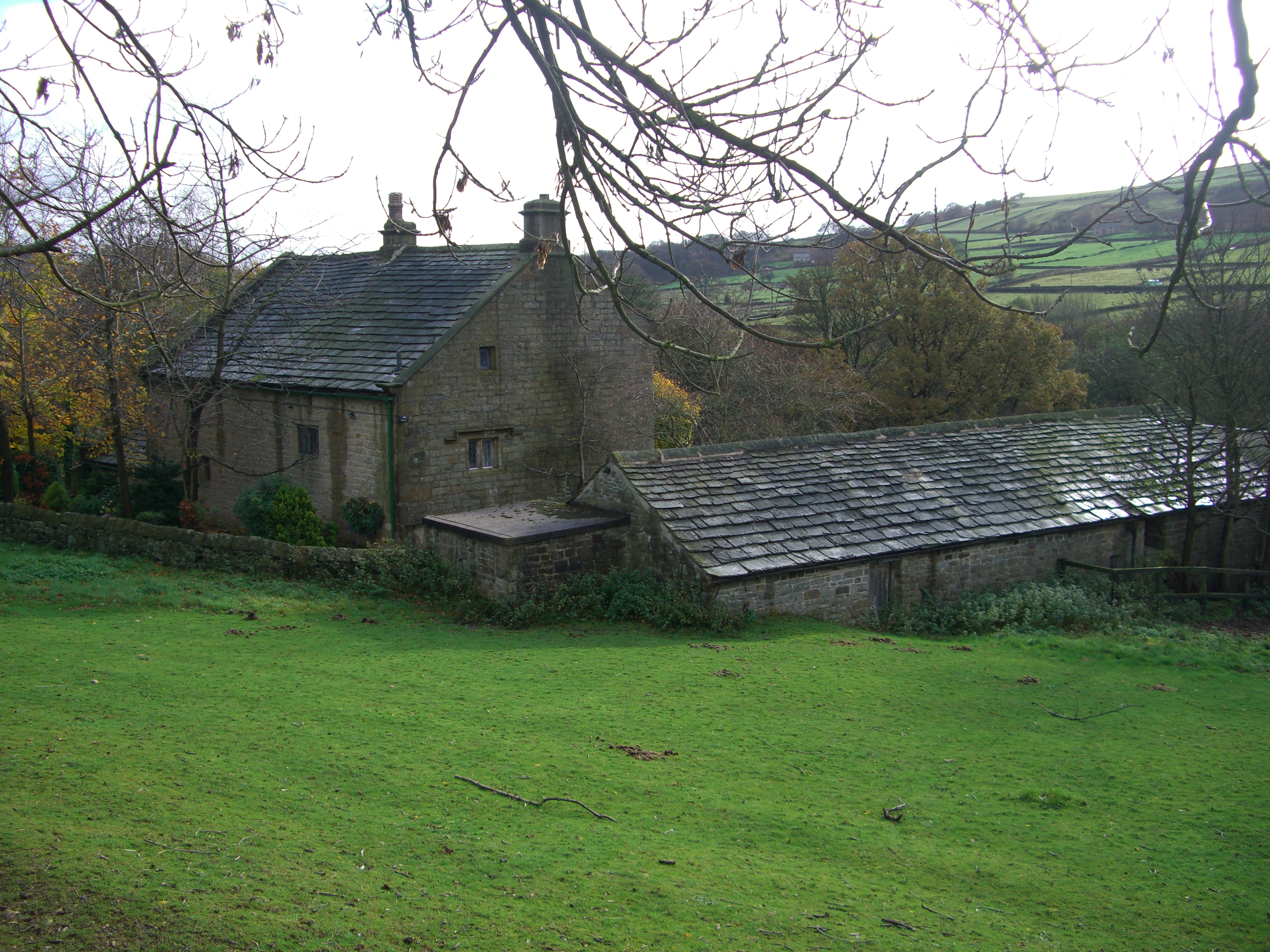
The house seen from Annet Lane with the outbuildings on the right hand side.

Fair House Farmhouse is a 17th-century building situated on Annet Lane in the village of Low Bradfield within the boundary of the City of Sheffield in South Yorkshire, England. The farmhouse is a Grade II* Listed Building while the stable and garage buildings immediately to the west of the main house are Grade II listed.

== History and architecture ==
Fair House Farmhouse is believed to date from the 1630s and was originally called Swinden House, panelling within the house has the date 1687 on it. The house is constructed in the locally available gritstone which has been dressed into coarse, squared blocks while the roof is of stone slates. The farmhouse consists of three storeys with most of the windows being at the front of the house which unusually faces away from the road (Annet Lane) and looks out over the valley of the Dale Dike. The ground floor of the front of the house consists of two large four light windows with the entrance door at the west end. The first floor also has two windows of similar size and design to the ground floor while the second storey has four smaller windows. The sides and rear of the house have only occasional small windows.

The interior has much of the original panelling to the walls and doors intact, the ground floor has a bressummer beam. There is a stone staircase to the first floor and an oak staircase with a blustered rail to the second.

The outbuildings are detached from the main house and run at right angles to it on its western side. They are approximately 12 metres in length and slope down to the valley of the Dale Dike, so much so that the downhill end of the building has two storeys while the uphill end has only one. The building materials are the same as the main house, being gritstone blocks and stone slate and the mainstay of the building is believed to be 17th century. However, there have been some changes to the original design with a large boarded double door being added and resulting changes to the stonework to make a garage. There have also been some modifications to some of the other openings.

== Great Sheffield flood ==
Fair House Farmhouse managed to survive the Great Sheffield Flood of 1864 when the dam wall of the Dale Dyke Dam fractured sending millions of gallons of water down the valley. The original dam wall stood just over a kilometre to the west of the house, there was great devastation in Low Bradfield but Fair House survived because it is in a slightly elevated position approximately 20 metres higher than the Dale Dike. Nearby stone built structures such as Annet House and Annet Bridge which stood by the Dike were completely swept away.
