= King Edward VII Orthopaedic Hospital, Sheffield =

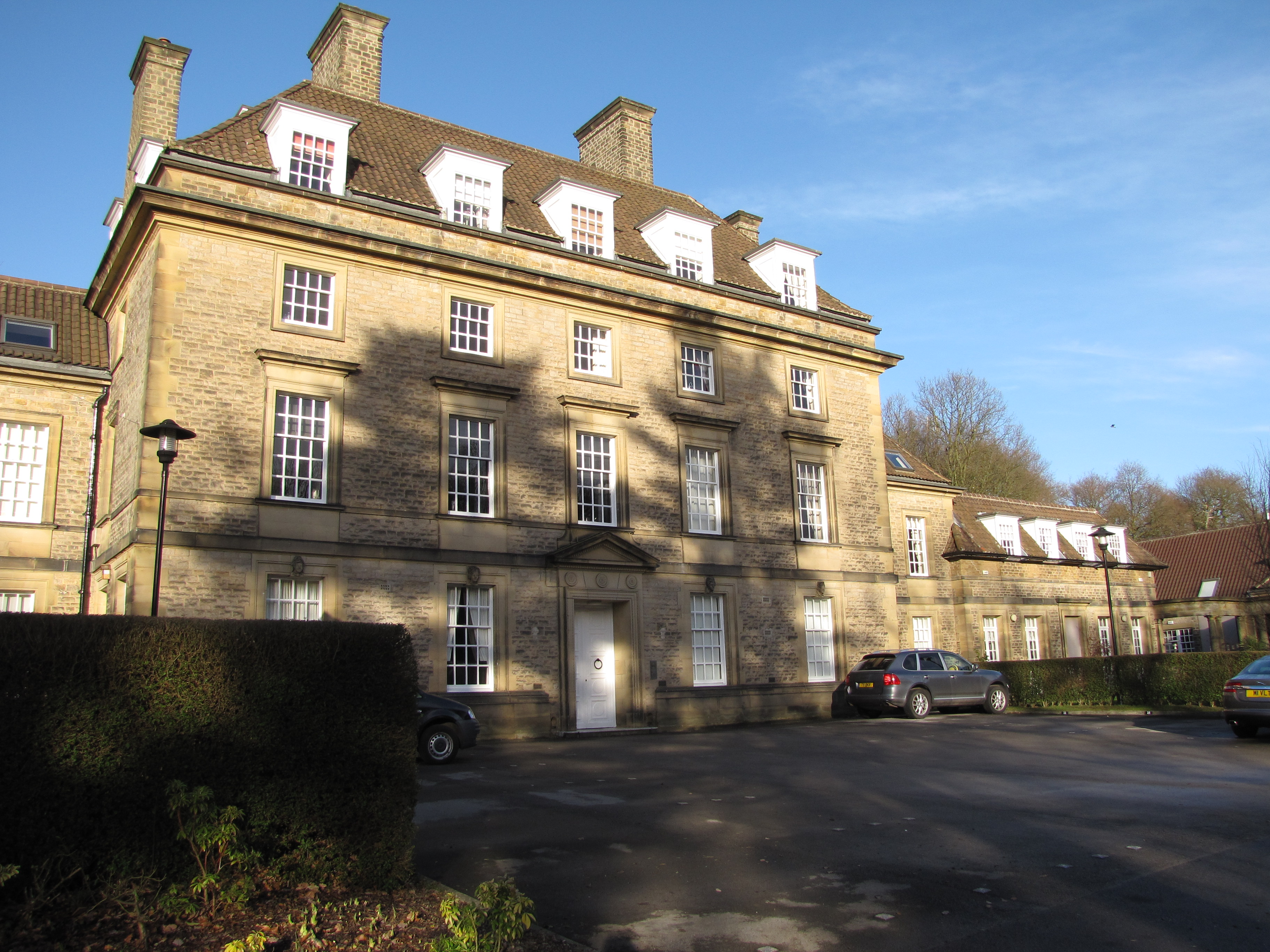
- King Edward VII Orthopaedic Hospital, Sheffield

- Shown in South Yorkshire

Geography
- Location: Sheffield, South Yorkshire, England
- Coordinates: 53.3835°N 1.5568°W

Organisation
- Care system: National Health Service
- Type: Orthopaedic

Services
- Emergency department: No

History
- Founded: 1910
- Closed: 1992

Links
- Website: www.mtw.nhs.uk

The King Edward VII Orthopaedic Hospital was a hospital in the Rivelin Valley area of Sheffield, England. The hospital closed in 1992 and the building has been converted into residential apartments.

== History ==
The King Edward VII Orthopaedic Hospital owed its existence to the fondness that the people of Sheffield had for King Edward VII who died in 1910. On his death a fund was set up and the population of the City raised £18,000 in his memory with the organisers expressing a desire that the money should be used to build a hospital school for crippled children. Sheffield City Council provided extra funds when it was found that £18,000 was not sufficient to build the hospital and the Duke of Norfolk presented the land in the Rivelin Valley on which it was to be built free of charge. Building work began in 1913 with the foundation stone being laid by the Duchess of Norfolk. W.A. Kenyon was the architect and despite delays caused by the First World War the hospital opened early in 1916 and had around 120 beds along with the associated treatment rooms and operating theatre. The hospital was known as the King Edward VII Hospital for Crippled Children until 1948 and it treated patients with tuberculosis, rickets, congenital deformities and poliomyelitis. The hospital pioneered Ultraviolet ray and vitamin treatment under the orthopaedic surgeon Dr. Creswell Lee Pattison.

In 1944 some of the children were moved out of the hospital to allow treatment of wounded soldiers; in the same year the hospital was recognised as a nurse training hospital. When the National Health Service was set up in 1948, the hospital was renamed the King Edward VII Orthopaedic Hospital and placed under the administration of Sheffield No. 3 Management Committee. Further expansion followed with two new ward blocks being constructed along with a workshop for the splint makers and bedrooms for the residential staff. In 1956 a hydrotherapy pool was installed, paid for by the Greaves Charitable Trust. The hospital closed in September 1992 and has now been converted into apartments. The main hospital building along with the boiler house, entrance lodge and the octagonal outbuilding are all Grade II listed buildings.
