= Wadsley Parish Church =

Anglican church in Wadsley, South Yorkshire, England

Coordinates: 53.4121°N 1.5178°W

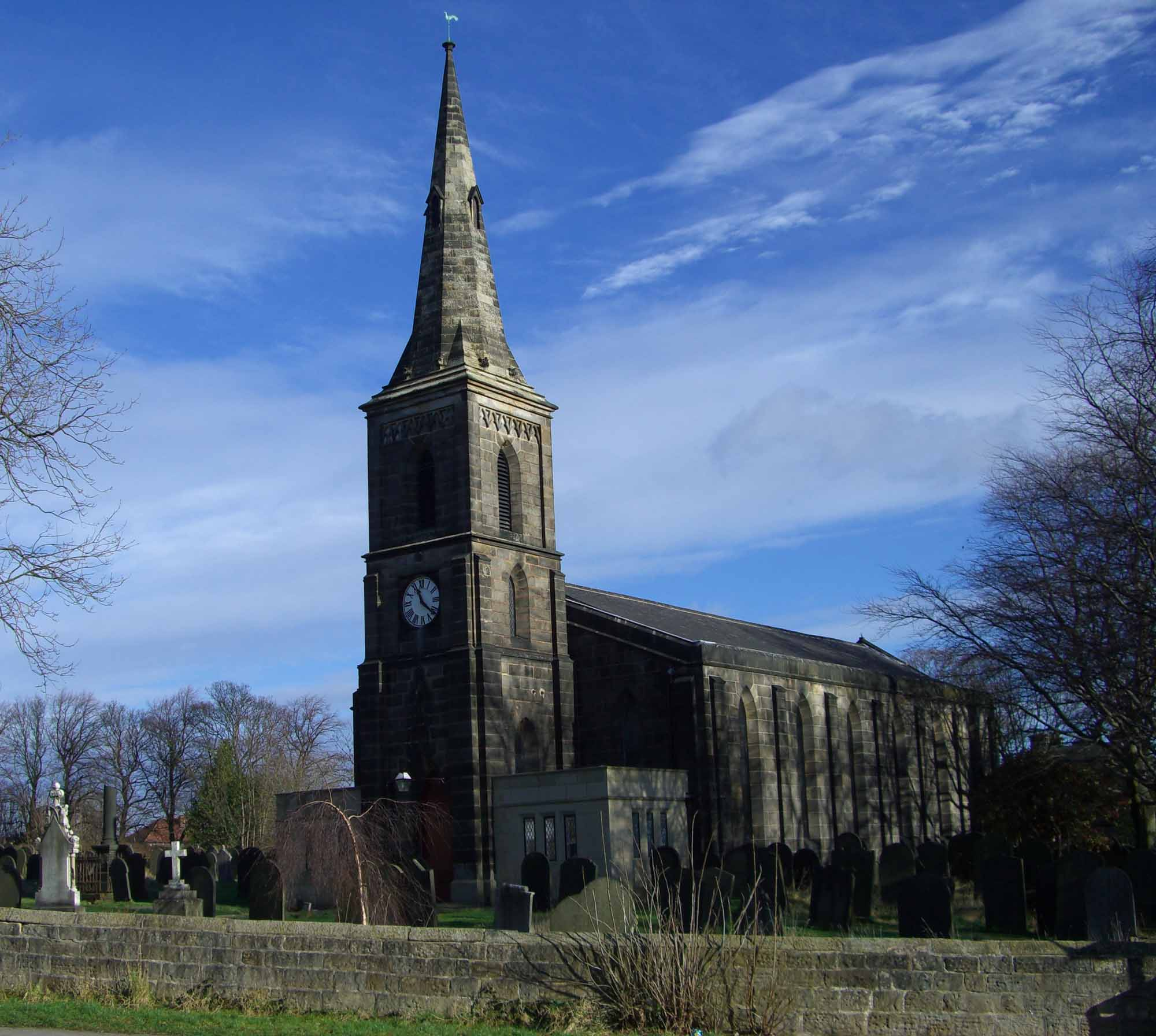
- Wadsley Parish Church
- Wadsley Parish Church
- OS grid reference: SK 32158 90694
- Denomination: Church of England
- Churchmanship: Evangelical
- Website: www.wadsleychurch.com

History
- Dedication: No dedication

Administration
- Province: York
- Diocese: Sheffield
- Parish: Sheffield

Clergy
- Vicar: Rev Dan Brown

Wadsley Parish Church is situated within the city of Sheffield, South Yorkshire, England. It is located on Worrall Road, 3 miles (5 km) north west of the city centre in the suburb of Wadsley, which was formerly a village outside the city boundary. The church is quite unusual in that it is not dedicated to a saint. It is a grade II listed building.

== History ==
The first mention of a church for the Wadsley area was in 1751 when an agreement between William Burton, Lord of the Manor of Wadsley and Margaret Bamforth, Lady of the Manor of Owlerton was drawn up to build a chapel of ease within the parish of Ecclesfield. The agreement stated that the Church of St. Mary, Ecclesfield, was too far distant for the ill or infirm to travel for divine service. However nothing further came of this agreement until the 1830s. The church was eventually built between the years 1832 and 1834 at a total cost of £3,500 by Joseph Potter. It is in the Gothic style with much use of Lancet arches and has cast iron piers. The money for construction was put forward by two sisters Ann and Elizabeth Harrison, daughters of Thomas Harrison, a wealthy saw manufacturer. The Harrison sisters disliked the Roman Catholic faith, and in particular the tradition of holding parades with effigies of saints etc. They specified that the church must not have a central aisle, so that no such procession could take place in the church, and also that the church must not be dedicated to a saint.

=== Construction ===
Fleester Field was chosen as the site for the church at the top of gently sloping meadowland. The plans for the building were re-drafted a number of times before being approved by the Harrison sisters. In the Autumn of 1832 the site was marked out by the builder and on 22 October 1832 the foundation stone was laid. 600 children who attended the local Sunday Schools were present at the laying of the stone which was carried out using a silver trowel by William Wilson, the uncle of the Harrison sisters. The church was opened on 21 May 1834, 20 days late; the delay was caused by a change in the design of the spire. The first service was led by Reverend S. Langton of St George's Church, Portobello, and Wadsley's first minister Francis Owen also delivered an address. The church was consecrated by the Archbishop of York, Edward Venables-Vernon-Harcourt, on 25 August 1835.

On 30 June 1841 Wadsley parish church received some autonomy from the parish of Ecclesfield when it had a definite district assigned to it. In June 1857, the minister was eventually allowed to publish Banns of marriage and carry out all the usual duties when Wadsley became a "new parish". In March 1883 complete independence was achieved when Alfred Gatty, Vicar of Ecclesfield, relinquished all ties with Wadsley.

=== Fire of 1884 ===
On Easter day 1884 the church suffered serious damage when a fire destroyed the roof and devastated much of the interior including the pews and organ. The damage took nine months to repair, costing £1,700; a stone was placed over the door in the porch to commemorate the restoration. In the ensuing investigation it was decided that the fire had been caused by sparks from a chimney which ran up the north wall of the building. The church did not hold a service again until Christmas Day 1884 and was officially re-opened by William Thomson, Archbishop of York, on 12 February 1885.

A later addition to the church was the choir vestry which was built in 1897 to commemorate the Diamond Jubilee of Queen Victoria. Probably the most eminent member and patron of the church was James Willis Dixon (1814–1876) eldest son of James Dixon, founder of Dixon's silversmiths in Sheffield. There is a memorial to him and his wife in the church nave. In 1917 George Cherry Weaver became minister; his long incumbency of 30 years saw many changes to the church, with electric light installed, pew rents abolished and the churchyard extended.

== Present day ==
The church underwent a major renovation and facelift in 2002–03: side balconies were removed and the rear balcony was extended over the new amenities which included a quiet room, a kitchen, and a larger welcome area. An office and a new toilet block were added to the exterior of the church on either side of the spire. A baptistry (a tank used for baptism by immersion) was also added, although the conventional font was retained.

== Graveyard ==
Victims of the Great Sheffield Flood of 1864 are buried in the graveyard, including members of the Watson, Price, and Atkinson families. The inscription on the Atkinson grave reads: "Ezra and Maurice, their son aged 15 and 9 months ... also William aged 13 and 4 months who perished by the bursting of the Bradfield reservoir, March 12, 1864". The church's original benefactors Ann and Elizabeth Harrison are both buried in the churchyard with a gothic memorial over their graves.

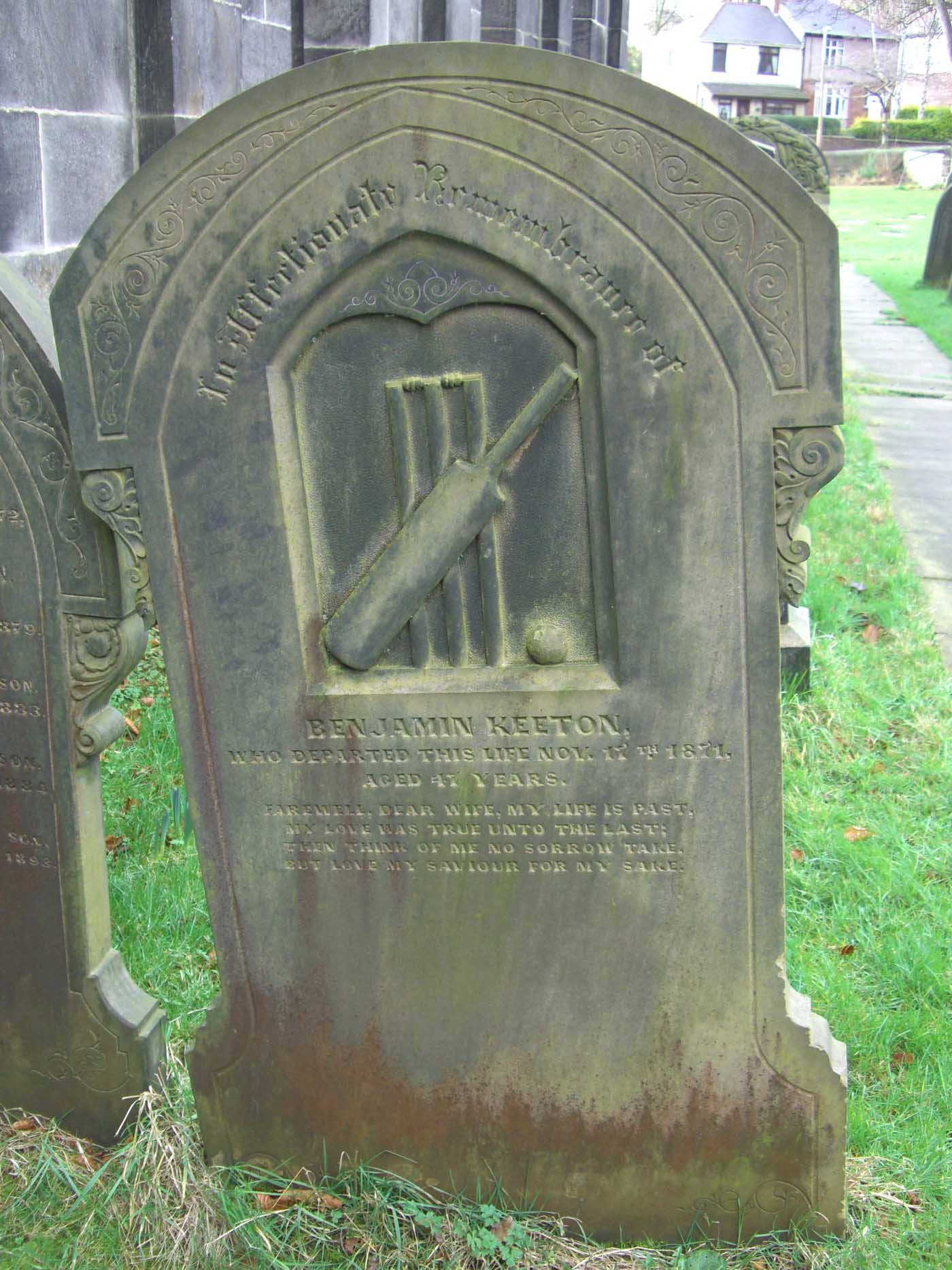
The Cricketer's Grave

Another grave which caused controversy, and was mentioned in the local press at the time, is the "Cricketer's Grave". This is the resting place of Benjamin Keeton, a well known cricket player in the area who played for the Hallam Cricket Club. When he died in 1871, aged 47, he requested that his grave should mark his devotion to cricket. His widow Fanny abided by his request and had a gravestone carved with cricket stumps, bat and ball on it. The stone caused some controversy, with the vicar and certain parishioners thinking it unsuitable. The stone was knocked down at one point, but replaced after a public meeting showed the majority in favour of it remaining.

The graveyard contains a large open area with no gravestones; this is the site of the burials of people from the nearby South Yorkshire Asylum (later Middlewood Hospital). Several hundred patients from the asylum were buried here in the Victorian era with no memorial, as it was considered a disgrace for a family member to be in an asylum. Many ceremonies were carried out with only the minister and a grave digger present.

There is a memorial to 23 servicemen who died of wounds while being treated at the nearby Wharncliffe War Hospital which the asylum became between 1915 and 1920. Another grave is that of Dr. T. Allan Taylor who developed the high nickel alloy steel needed for the production of the jet engine by Frank Whittle in the 1930s.
