= Stannington (ward) =

Electoral ward in the City of Sheffield, South Yorkshire, England

- Shown within Sheffield
- Population: 18,222 (2011)
- Metropolitan borough: City of Sheffield
- Metropolitan county: South Yorkshire
- Region: Yorkshire and the Humber
- Country: England
- Sovereign state: United Kingdom
- UK Parliament: Sheffield Hallam
- Councillors: Richard Williams (Liberal Democrats); Will Sapwell (Liberal Democrats); Penny Baker (Liberal Democrats)

Stannington ward is one of the 28 electoral wards in the City of Sheffield, England. It is located in the western part of the borough, including some westernmost suburbs of the city; most of the land is rural. The population of the ward at the 2011 Census was 18,222.

It is one of the wards that make up the Sheffield Hallam parliamentary constituency.

== Description ==
The population of this ward in 2011 was 18,222 in 8,030 Households in a land area of 102 km^{2} (39 sq mi), of which over 90% is greenspace.

Most of the area of the ward is covered by the civil parish of Bradfield.

The ward includes parts of the western fringes of the greater conurbation of Sheffield, including: the Stannington and Middlewood suburbs of Sheffield, and the village suburbs of Loxley and Worrall, all located on the eastern fringes of the ward. The remainder of the eastern half of the ward is mostly agricultural land, including some industry, and several reservoirs (Damflask Reservoir, Dale Dike Reservoir, Strines Reservoir, and Agden Reservoir) and includes the villages of Low Bradfield, High Bradfield, and Dungworth.

The western part of the ward is moorland, including Howden and Bradfield moors, and contains no significant settlements.

Stannington ward was also home to a council run branch library until this facility was withdrawn in 2014 by the local authority as a cost cutting measure. The replacement of this council run service by a volunteer-led facility has been controversial, with prominent library campaign group Voices For The Library highlighting major concerns around volunteers having responsibility for the "Books On Prescription" service and issues surrounding data protection. The transfer of the library to volunteers has also resulted in huge decreases in book loans and other usage.

== See also ==
- Moscar Cross, boundary marker and guide stone, and area on the Derbyshire border.

== Locations ==
- Stannington (suburb)53.396479°N 1.536021°W, (grid reference SK309889)
- Loxley 53.4049°N 1.5378°W, (grid reference SK310900)
- Worral 53.424354°N 1.538728°W, (grid reference SK307920)
- Low Bradfield 53.422900°N 1.605400°W,
- High Bradfield 53.428800°N 1.598100°W, (grid reference SK267923)
- Dungworth 53.406522°N 1.578030°W, (grid reference SK281900)
- Middlewood 53.420000°N 1.520000°W
