= Monastery of The Holy Spirit, Sheffield =

Monastery in Sheffield, England

Coordinates: 53.426051°N 1.572201°W

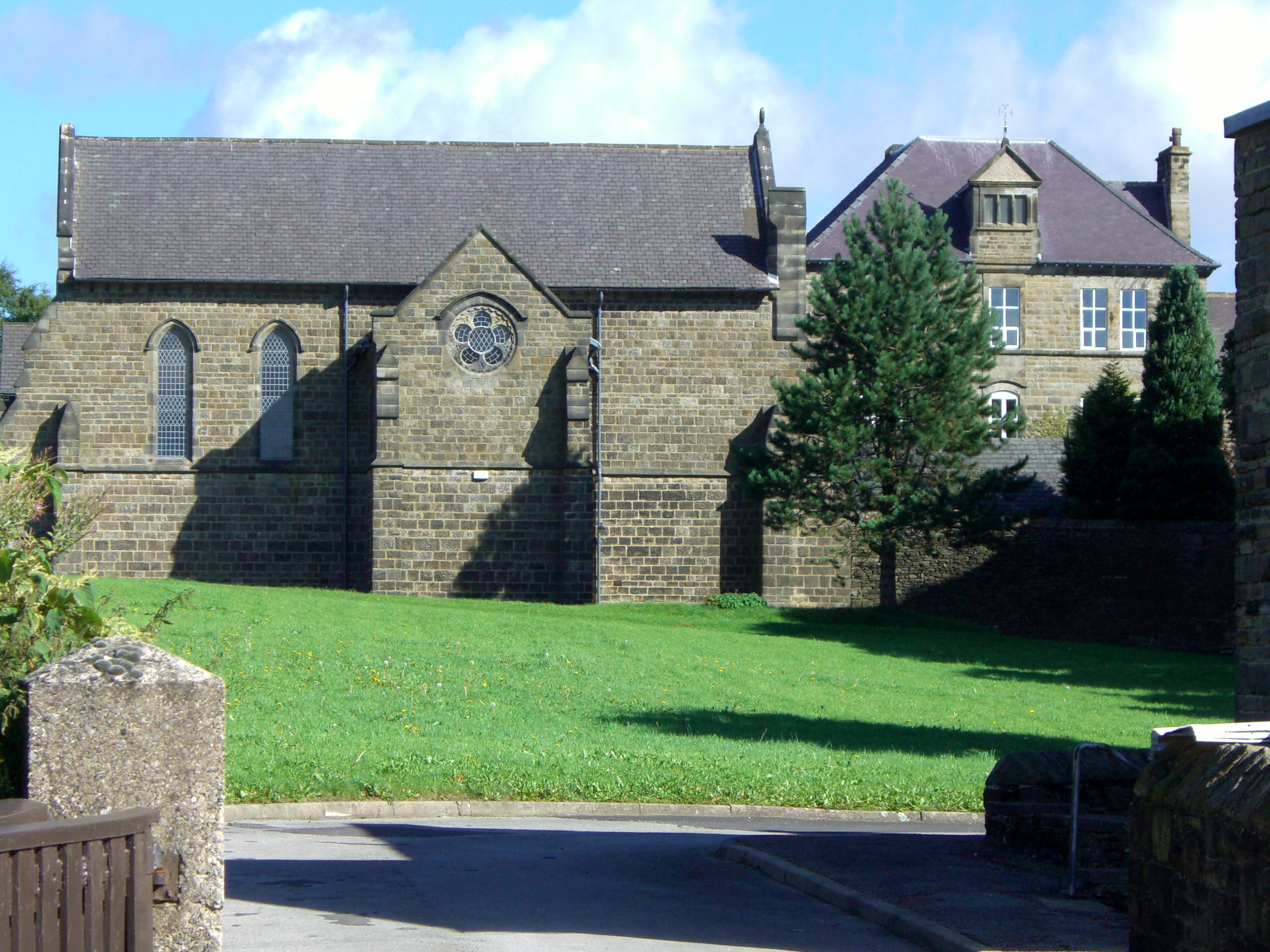
Kirk Edge convent seen from the main entrance

The Monastery of The Holy Spirit, known locally as Kirk Edge Convent, was a Discalced Carmelite monastery. It is situated on Kirk Edge Road between the villages of Worrall and High Bradfield within the boundaries of the City of Sheffield, England. It is one of 18 carmels in the United Kingdom. The building stands just within the Peak District at a height of 340 metres (1115 feet) and has extensive views of the surrounding area.

== History ==
=== Orphanage ===
The building was constructed in 1871 and was planned to be used as an orphanage. Father Myers of St Vincent's in Sheffield was the main driving force behind the plan, wanting to set up training opportunities for orphan Catholic boys as already existed for orphan girls at Howard Hill at Walkley. Henry Fitzalan-Howard, 15th Duke of Norfolk provided 18 acres of land at Kirk Edge and gave finance for the buildings which were to cover 300 square feet. The architect was Hadfield & Son and the building was modelled on the Motherhouse of the Sisters of Charity at 140 Rue du Bac in Paris. The project was described in the April 1871 edition of The Builder as: “A new institution for poor boys and girls of the Roman Catholic religion of the town and neighbourhood of Sheffield at Kirk Edge, near Bradfield, which has been prepared by Messrs Hadfield & Son, have been adopted by the committee and work is to be forthwith commenced. The whole pile when completed will give accommodation for 300 children. The building will be of stone and, including the courts, will cover an area of 300 square feet”. The orphanage was opened before the end of 1871 with the orphans under the care of the resident Sisters of Charity.

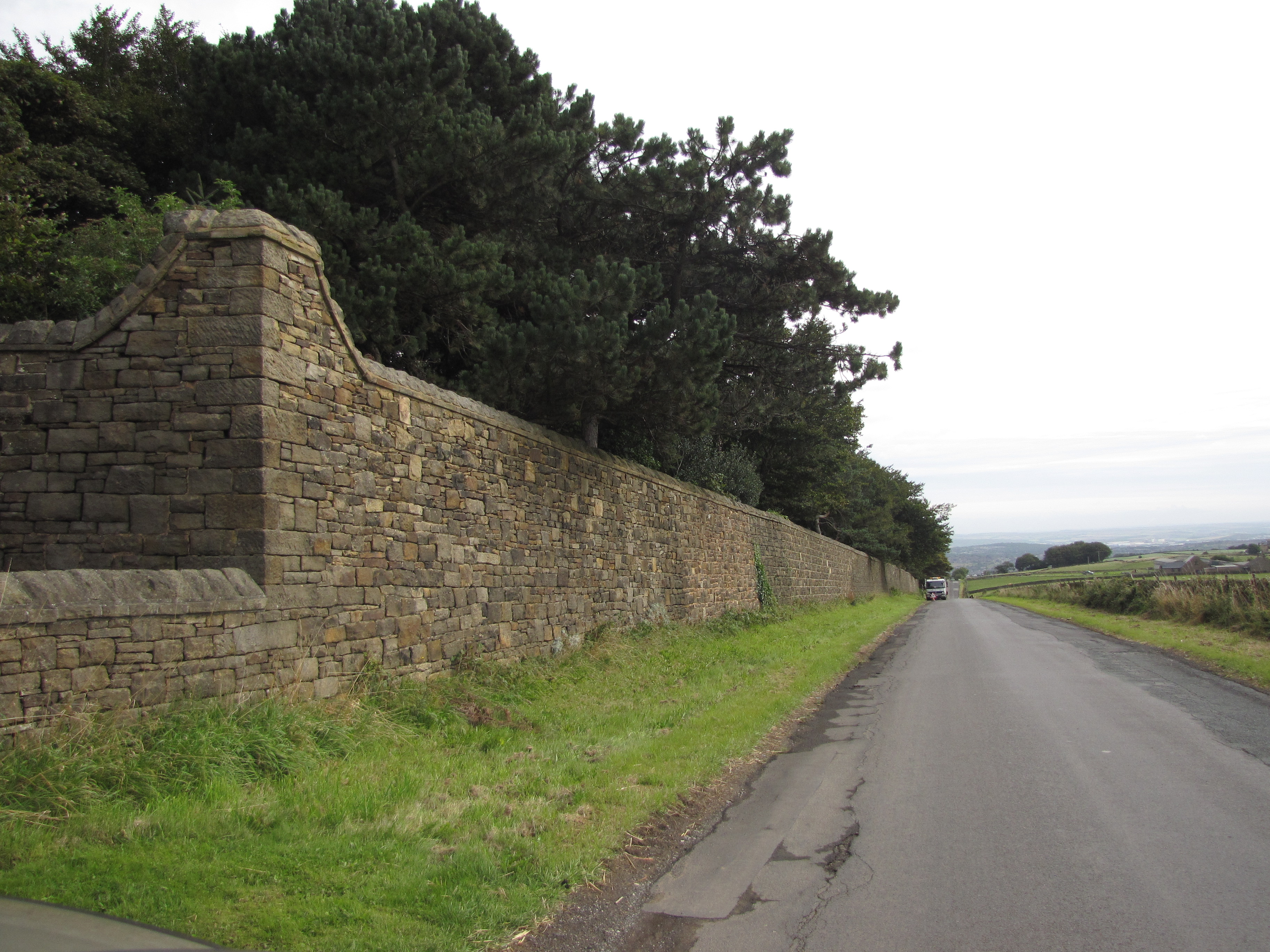
The monastery is surrounded by a 12 foot high wall, surroundin<g the enclosure

By 1876, the building was listed in the Catholic Directory as an Industrial school for girls, still under the care of the Sisters of Charity. In 1885, a new wing was opened consisting of a chapel in the Renaissance style measuring 90 feet long by 26 feet wide, a dormitory and infirmary. The architects were again Hadfield and Son and the builders were Messrs Tomlinson of Leeds and Sheffield. The new wing opened on 29 June 1885, being built in stone at right angles to the rest of the building and heated by low pressure water pipes. The total cost of the project was £1,500, a considerable amount, the money being raised by a visit to the city by Cardinal Henry Edward Manning who preached a sermon of appeal at St Marie’s to raise the money. The visit of Manning to Sheffield was the first by a Cardinal since the Reformation.

The cardinal’s successful appeal for the new wing only staved off closure for two years, in 1887 it was announced that the orphanage was to close with water supply problems being cited as the reason. All water used by the building had to be pumped by windmill from the lower levels of the valley. Upon closure the orphans were transferred back to the home at Howard Hill. The building lay empty for some time before being used as a holiday centre for poor boys from Sheffield by a Catholic society. Around 1900 the premises were used as a reformatory for a time by the Home Office.

=== Carmelite monastery ===
In 1910 it was suggested by the Duke of Norfolk’s sister who was a Carmelite at the Most Holy Trinity monastery in Notting Hill, that Kirk Edge should be turned into a Carmelite monastery. The Duke of Norfolk presented the land to the Carmelites and about twelve sisters came from the Most Holy Trinity Monastery, in London's Notting Hill where the facilities were overcrowded. £10,000 was spent on extending and fitting out the premises, with the work again being done by the architects Hadfields. A public chapel seating 150, new parlours and rooms for three lay sisters were built as well a 12 foot high stone wall which enclosed the grounds. On 16 July 1911 the monastery was opened and inaugurated by Cardinal Francis Bourne and Bishop Joseph Cowgill.

During the First World War Miss Phyllis Browne, daughter of the Rector of Bradfield Church and local teacher at High Bradfield School entered the monastery after the death of her fiancé on the Western Front causing a local scandal. Browne did however later leave the convent and married, finally passing away in Bridlington in the 1970's.

=== Recent history ===
On Monday 5 October 2009, the monastery hosted the relics of Thérèse of Lisieux for three hours as part of a nationwide tour of the U.K. At the time, Sr. Mary of the Resurrection, aged 83 and prioress of the monastery, stated, "We were surprised but very privileged to be chosen, we thought the relics would go to the cathedral in Sheffield. It's a big event for us and a joy.”

In October 2024 the monastery closed and the building was for sale for around £3 million. In 2024 the nine remaining nuns could not maintain the heating costs for the large Victorian property any longer.
