= Loxley, South Yorkshire =

Village in South Yorkshire, England

Coordinates: 53.4049°N 1.5378°W

Loxley
- Village and Suburb
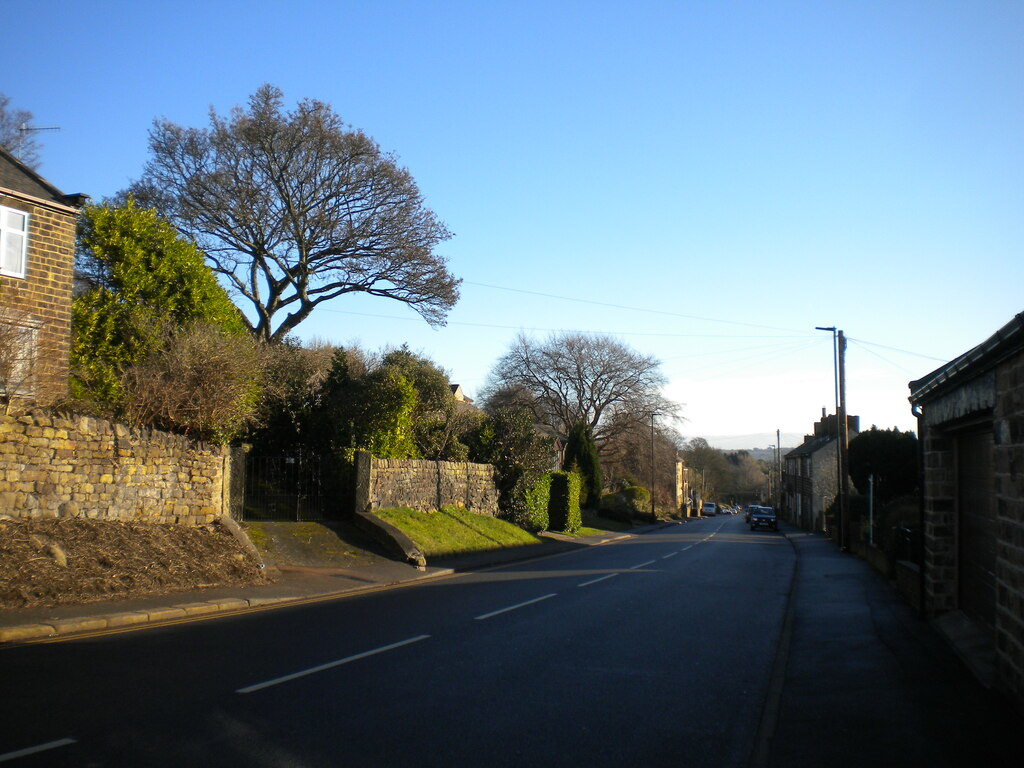
- Loxley Road

- Location within South Yorkshire
- Metropolitan borough: Sheffield
- Metropolitan county: South Yorkshire
- Region: Yorkshire and the Humber
- Country: England
- Sovereign state: United Kingdom
- Post town: SHEFFIELD
- Postcode district: S6
- Dialling code: 0114
- Police: South Yorkshire
- Fire: South Yorkshire
- Ambulance: Yorkshire
- UK Parliament: Sheffield Hallam

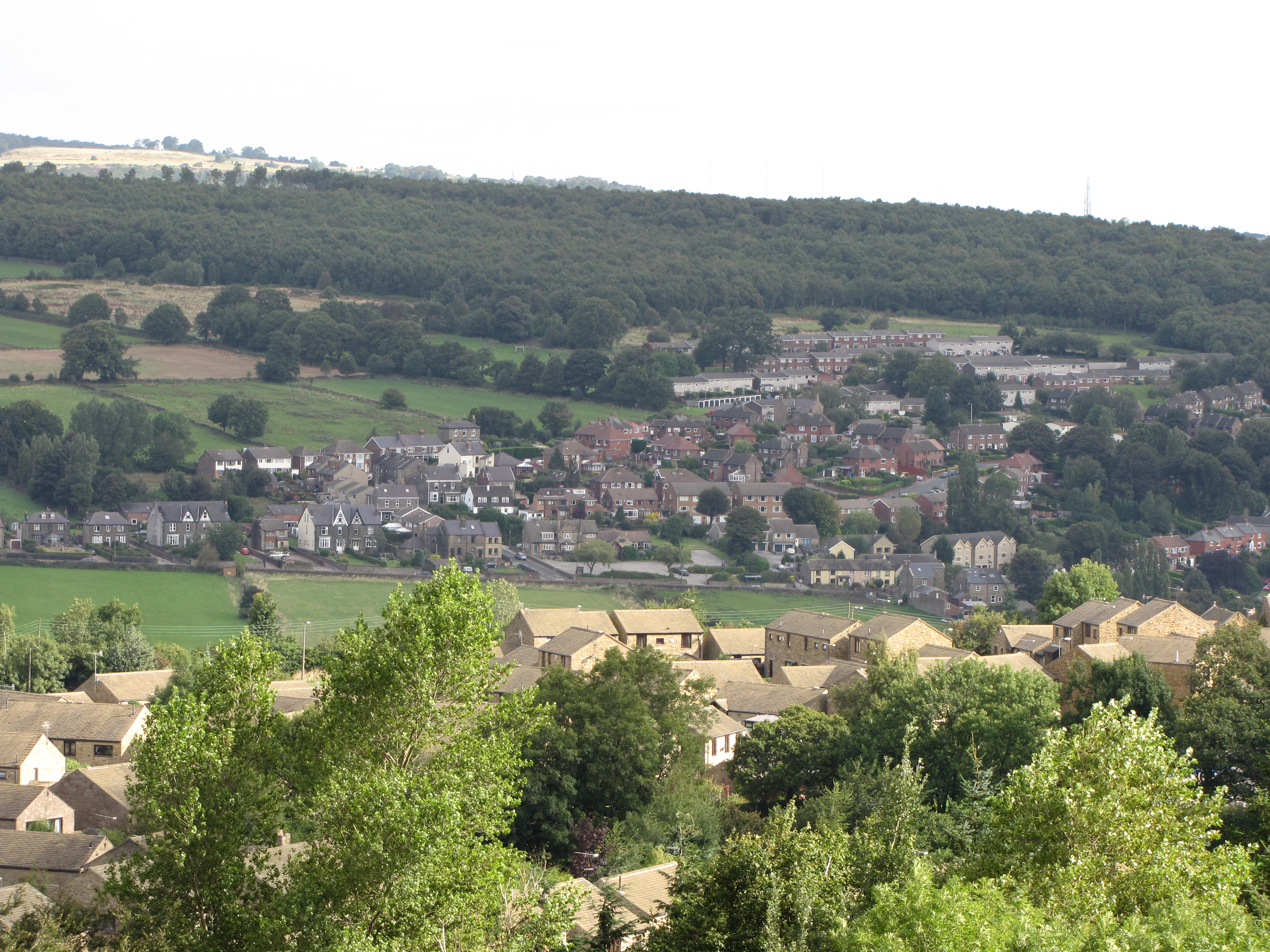
The centre of Loxley seen from Stannington village, 1.25 miles (2.01 km) to the south-west across the Loxley Valley.

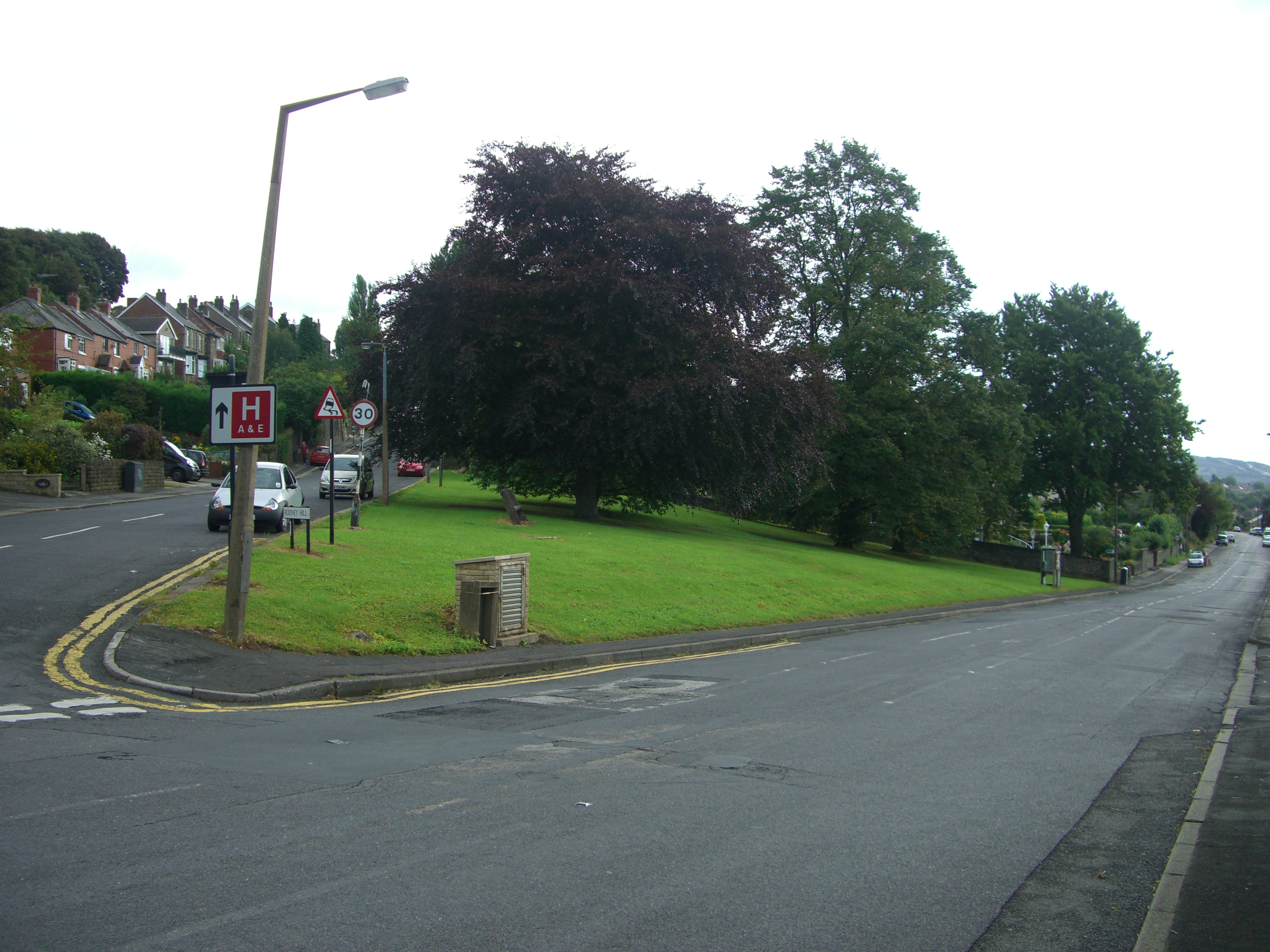
The village green stands at the junction of Loxley Road and Rodney Hill. The copper beech tree was planted in 1935 to mark the Silver Jubilee of King George V.

Loxley is a village and a suburb of the city of Sheffield, England. It is a long linear community which stretches by the side of the River Loxley and along the B6077 (Loxley Road) for almost 2.5 miles (4 km). Loxley extends from its borders with the suburbs of Malin Bridge and Wisewood westward to the hamlet of Stacey Bank near Damflask Reservoir. The centre of the suburb is situated at the junction of Rodney Hill and Loxley Road where the old village green stands and this is located 3 miles (5 km) north west of Sheffield city centre. The suburb falls within the Stannington ward of the City of Sheffield.

Loxley was a village in the West Riding of Yorkshire under the jurisdiction of Wortley Rural District Council, until it became part of the City of Sheffield in the 1974 boundary changes brought on by the Local Government Act 1972. Today the suburb is within Bradfield Parish Council, and consists almost exclusively of residential housing but it did have some industrial activity in the past. Much of the Loxley Valley is designated as green belt land.

The place-name derives from the Old English words lox, meaning 'lynx', and leah, meaning "glade". Loxley had a population of 1,775 in 2011.

== History ==
=== Post–Conquest ===
The area on which Loxley stands was originally moorland; Loxley Chase was a large expanse of upland ground set aside for hunting by the Norman lords after the Conquest in the 11th century. The Loxley valley was an extensive woodland which was mentioned in the inquisition post mortem after the death of Thomas de Furnival, 1st Lord Furnival (1270–1332). Hunting on Loxley Chase was an infrequent pursuit, and so much of the more productive ground in the valley was turned over to farming. Loxley developed over the following centuries as agricultural and common land with a few scattered farms.

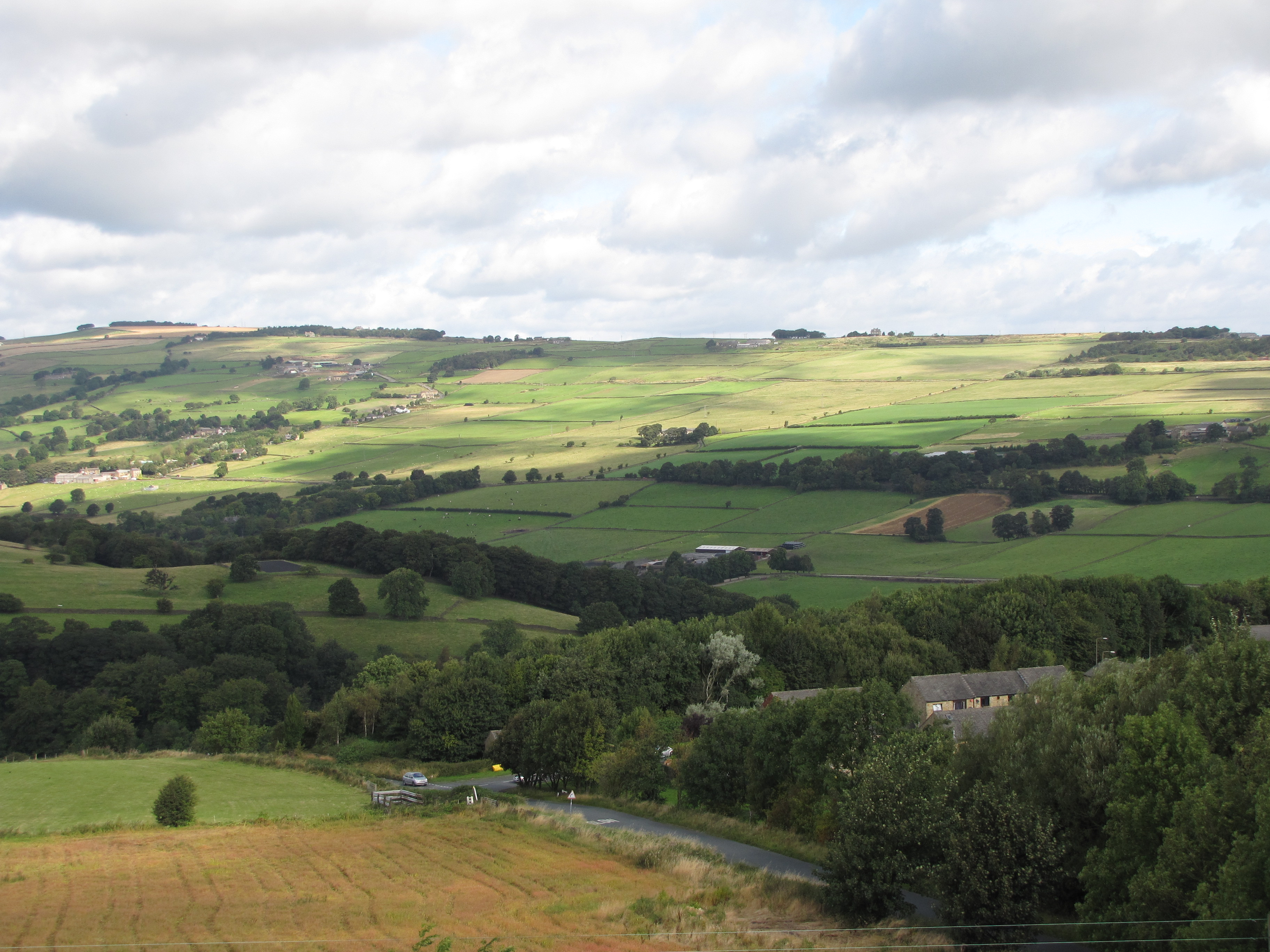
Loxley Chase on the northern side of the Loxley Valley was formerly moorland that was converted to pasture land and enclosed by straight dry stone walls.

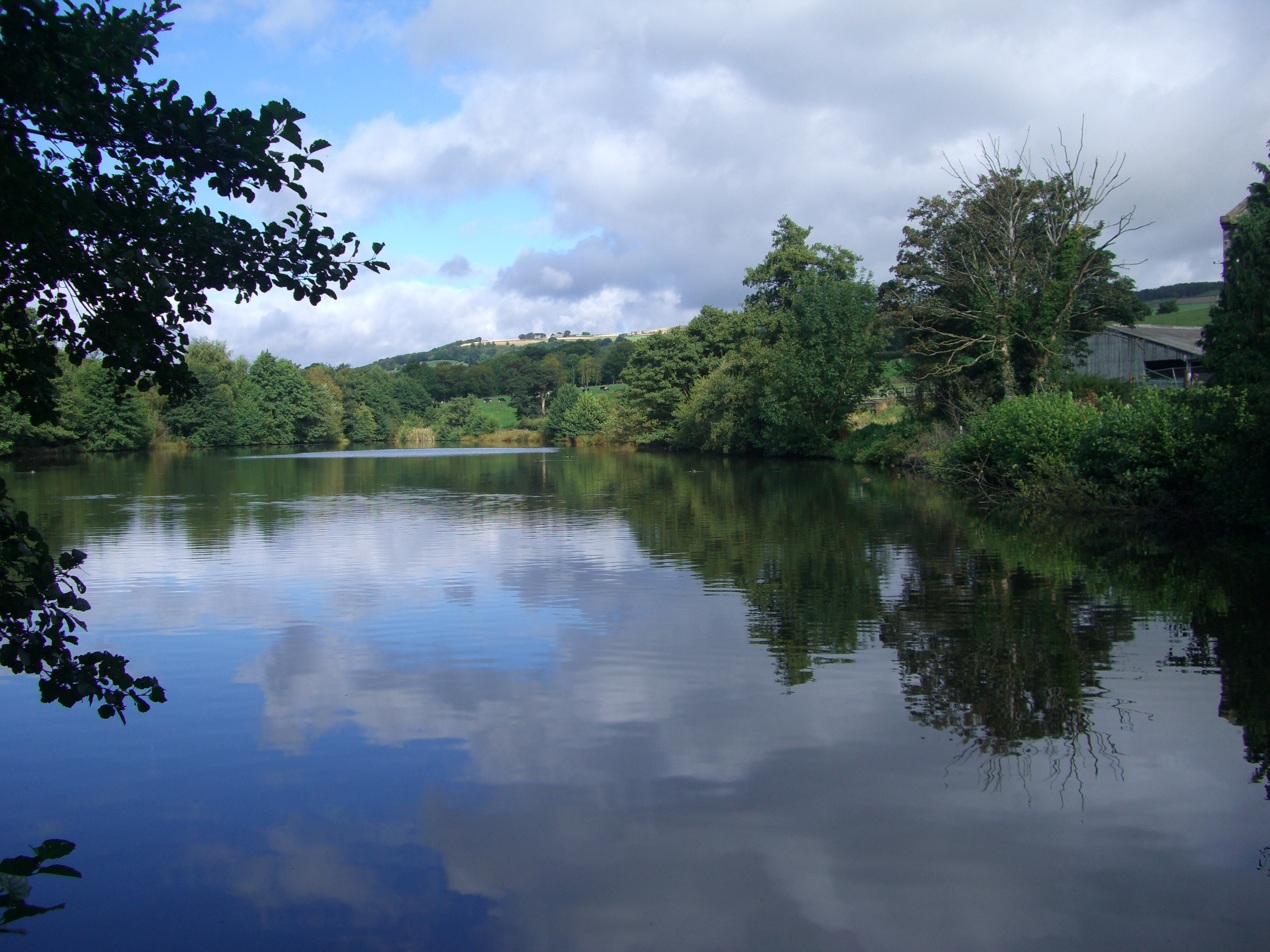
Old Wheel Dam created to drive the Old Wheel forge on the River Loxley near Rowell Bridge.

=== Robin Hood legend ===
The extensive forest of Loxley Chase extended as far south east as Nottinghamshire in the 12th century where it joined up with Sherwood Forest. Loxley is one of the locations claimed as the birthplace of Robin Hood. It is maintained that Robin of Locksley or Robert Locksley was born in the area in 1160 with John Harrison saying in his Exact and Perfect Survey and View of the Mannor of Sheffield of 1637, "Little Haggas Croft (pasture) wherein is ye founacion of a house or cottage where Robin Hood was borne." Little Haggas Croft was in the area of present-day Normandale House on Rodney Hill. Ballads from the High Middle Ages published in the Child Ballads such as A Gest of Robyn Hode, Robin Hood and the Monk, Robin Hood and Guy of Gisborne, and Robin Hood and the Potter, as well as Sir Walter Scott's 1820 novel Ivanhoe all point to a possible South Yorkshire birth for the legend.

In her maiden speech to Parliament in 2020, the local MP Olivia Blake said that the Sheffield Hallam constituency had a "very long history of social justice", as mythology points to a Yorkshire origin for Robin Hood in Loxley, lending her support to the idea that Loxley was the birthplace of Robin Hood.

=== Industrial and agricultural expansion ===
Industry came to the Loxley area in the middle of the 17th century when the first mills were set up on the fast flowing River Loxley as small pocket businesses. Steel and iron forging and rolling mills were established and became the main manufacturing processes with the Loxley Steel Works, the Green Wheel Steel Works, the Little Matlock Rolling Mill and the Olive Rolling Mill all becoming established industries by the river. Many of the mill ponds associated with these mills are still present on the river and provide a haven for fish and wildlife.

During the 1800s, the Loxley Valley became an important producer of refractory bricks and materials for the expanding Sheffield steel industry. The bricks were used to line the furnaces and were made from Fireclay from the Stannington pot clay seam which was prevalent in the Loxley area and the ramming materials and some bricks were made from ganister, a sort of sandstone. Many ganister and fireclay mines existed in the area supplying the local firms of Bramalls (ganister bricks and monolithics) Siddons Bros. (ganister monolithics), Thomas Wragg & Sons (Storrs Fire Clay Works) and Thomas Marshall and Co. (Storrs Bridge Fire Brick Works) and later Hepworths, which sprang up in the district and produced the bricks. Refractory production ceased in the area in the 1990s. Wraggs and Marshalls along with Dysons Griffs Works at nearby Stannington, specialised in manufacturing fireclay-based casting pit (pouring pit) refractory holloware and ladle flow control bricks for the steel industry worldwide. Carblox, part of the Marshall group, shared the Storrs Bridge Works site manufacturing carbon blocks for use in hearths in blast furnaces.

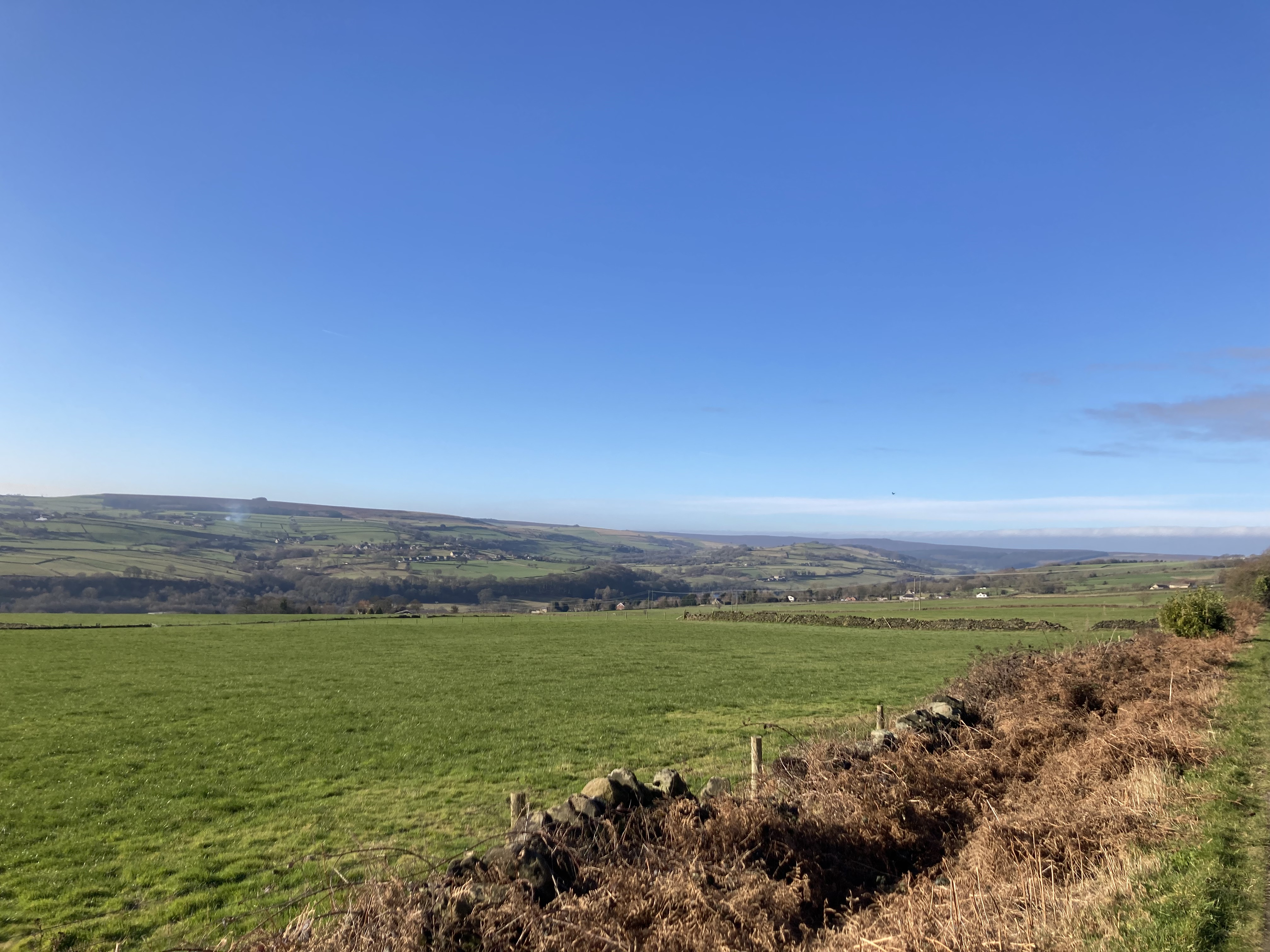
Loxley Valley looking southwest from Myers Lane

All three plants (Marshalls, Wraggs and Dysons) closed following a collapse in demand for casting pit refractories of the type made locally mainly because of the introduction of continuous casting of steel worldwide and because of the general decline of the British steel industry. Carblox's plant closed and carbon block production moved to Hepworth's Bawtry works.

Farming in the Loxley Valley was extended by the passing of the Wadsley and Loxley Chase Act 1789. This allowed the conversion of moorland to grass pasture which was enclosed by straight dry stone walls and roads.

=== Great Sheffield Flood ===
Loxley suffered greatly on 11 March 1864 when the dam wall of the Dale Dike Reservoir was breached causing the Great Sheffield Flood. 17 people died in the flood in the Loxley area including five members of the Chapman family along with their domestic servant Alathea Hague and apprentice John Bower. The trip hammer and rolling mill works owned by the Chapmans was completely destroyed. Most of the industrial mills in the area were either destroyed or severely damaged but were quickly rebuilt with compensation money from the Water Company.

=== Residential development ===
The substantial residential development of Loxley started between 1905 and the beginning of the First World War, with housing expansion taking place on Rodney Hill and Loxley Road near the village green. Inter-war building established the Normandale area, and post-Second World War building saw a large amount of Council housing being built in the area.

== Present day ==
=== Statistics ===
Present-day Loxley has a population of 1,828, living in 753 households, the majority of which (82.6%) are owner occupied. 12.5% are rented from the local authority. A high proportion (76%) of the housing in the area is either detached or semi-detached and this is well above the average for the whole of Sheffield.

=== Buildings and landmarks ===
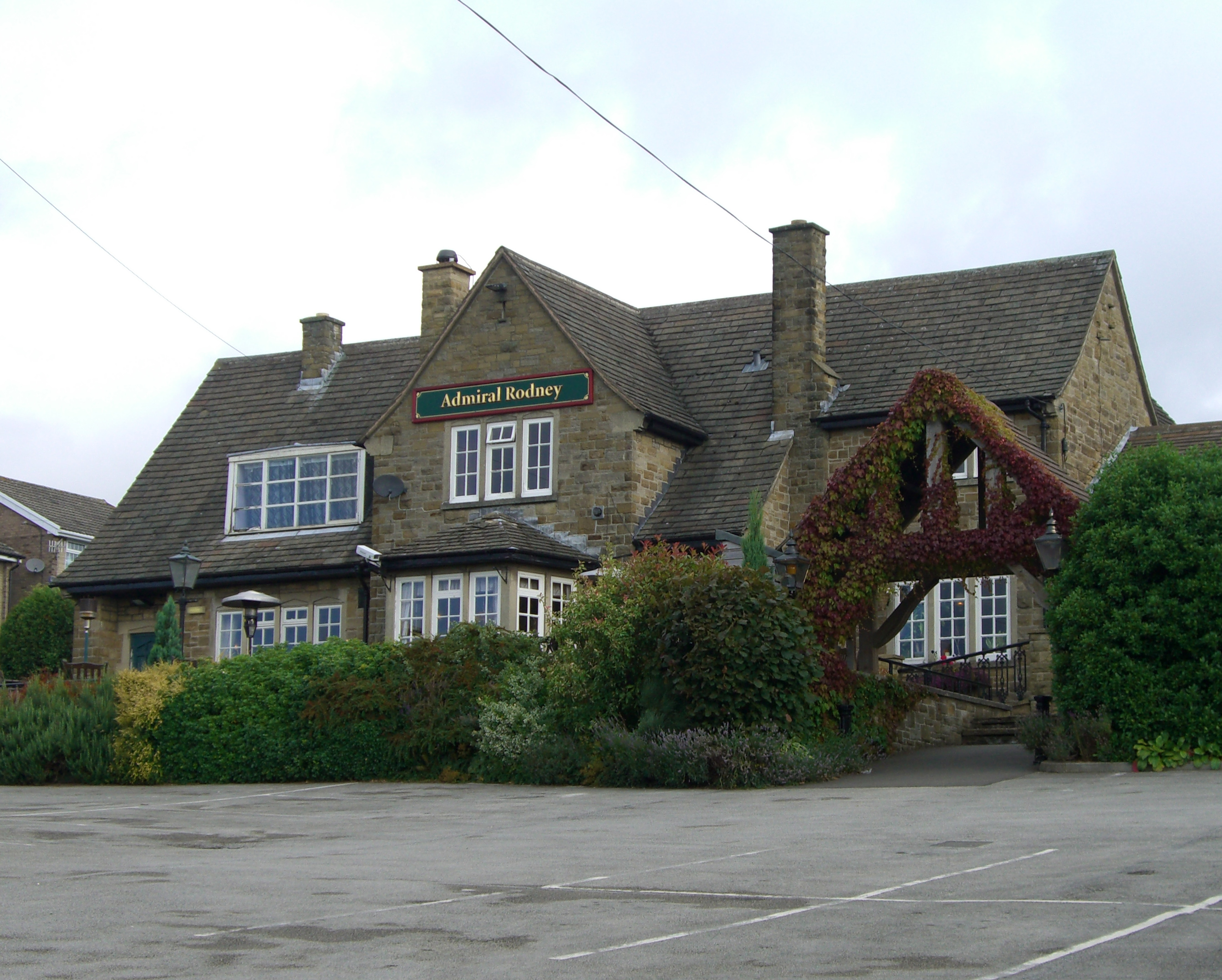
The Admiral Rodney public house.

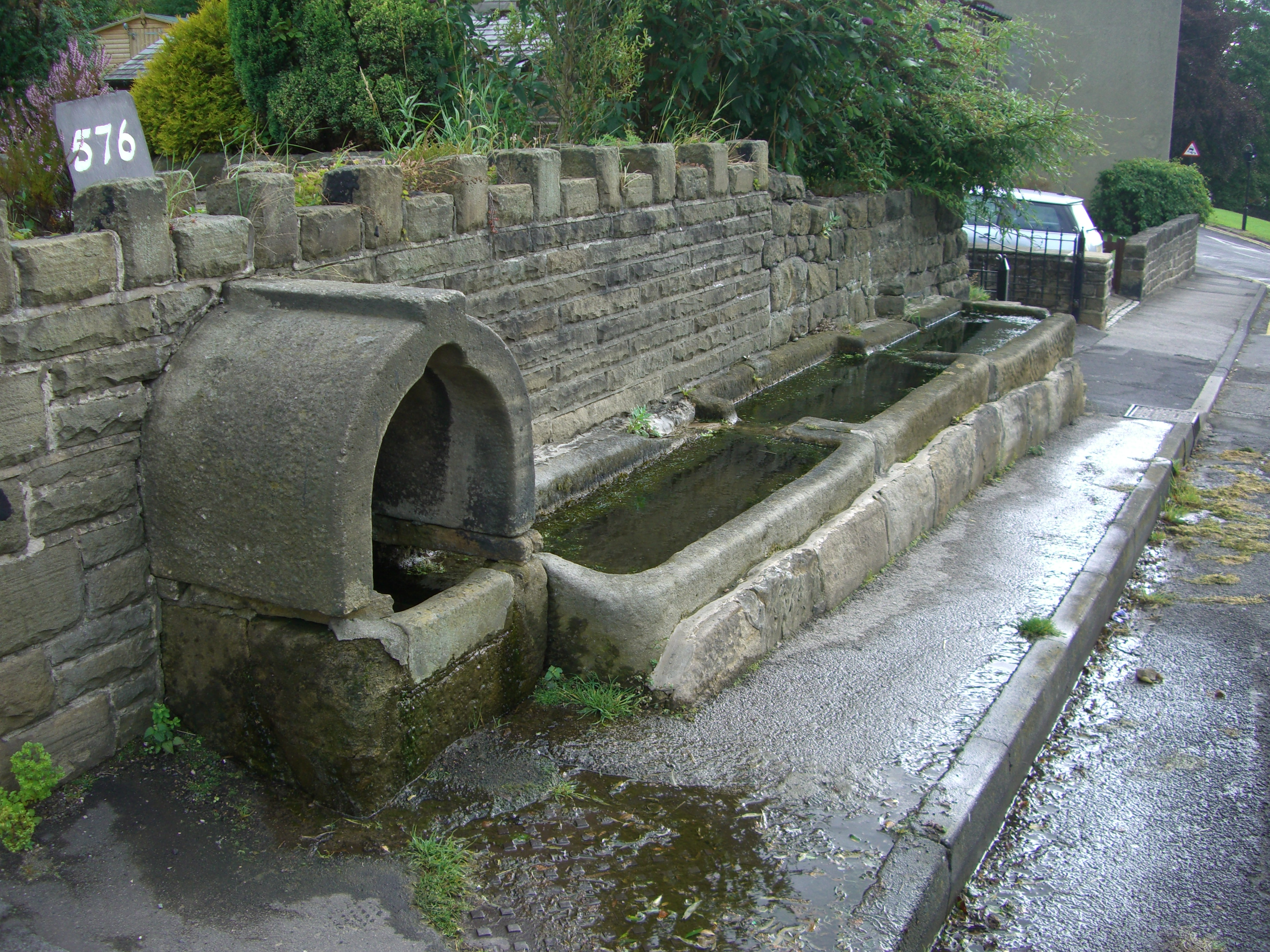
Old water troughs in the village centre.

Loxley has no extensive shopping area, with most of the residents commuting to Hillsborough to do their shopping. There are three public houses in the area, the best known of which is the Admiral Rodney; the pub has a long history and was originally named after George Brydges Rodney, 1st Baron Rodney after his defeat of the French in the Battle of the Saintes in 1782. The current Admiral Rodney dates from 1957 when the old pub was demolished and a new one built further back from the road. The Nag's Head is in the small rural hamlet of Stacey Bank and is surrounded by farm buildings at the very west of the suburb. The Wisewood Inn is the most easterly of the three and is situated in the Normandale area.

After the closure and sale into private ownership of Loxley Methodist Church in 2012, there are no longer any places of worship in Loxley. The church building being situated at the junction of Loxley Road and Low Matlock Lane; this was built in 1885. Loxley United Reformed Church, a Grade II* listed building, located near the junction on Loxley Road and Rowell Lane was constructed in 1787 and closed in 1993 and is now in private ownership although the burial ground is still used, in 2016 the chapel was destroyed by fire and as of 2020 still sits as an empty shell surrounded by construction fencing. There is one school in the area: Loxley Primary School opened in 1911 and is situated on Rodney Hill; it has just over 200 pupils between the ages of 4 and 11. Senior pupils in the area go to Bradfield School in Worrall.

=== Hepworth's refractory site ===
The site of the former Hepworth's refractory works (previously Marshalls, Wraggs and Carblox works) was purchased by the house building company, Bovis Homes Group who intended to build 500 homes on the site in plans released in 2006. However the plans have met opposition from the Loxley Valley Protection Society, the Loxley Valley Design Group, the Campaign to Protect Rural England and Bradfield Parish Council. Bovis have not received permission to go ahead with the development and as of 2020 the site is still a derelict industrial site.

=== Recreation areas ===
Loxley has a recreation ground on Loxley Road near the junction with Long Lane; it is the only substantial public open space in the suburb. However, just to the north is Loxley Common, an ancient area of common land which is now owned and managed by Sheffield City Council on behalf of the people of the city. The common consists of heath land interspersed with trees. The southern slopes of the common which run down to the Loxley Valley have a sandstone escarpment, below which is thick woodland.
