= Worrall =

Village in South Yorkshire, England

Coordinates: 53.424°N 1.539°W

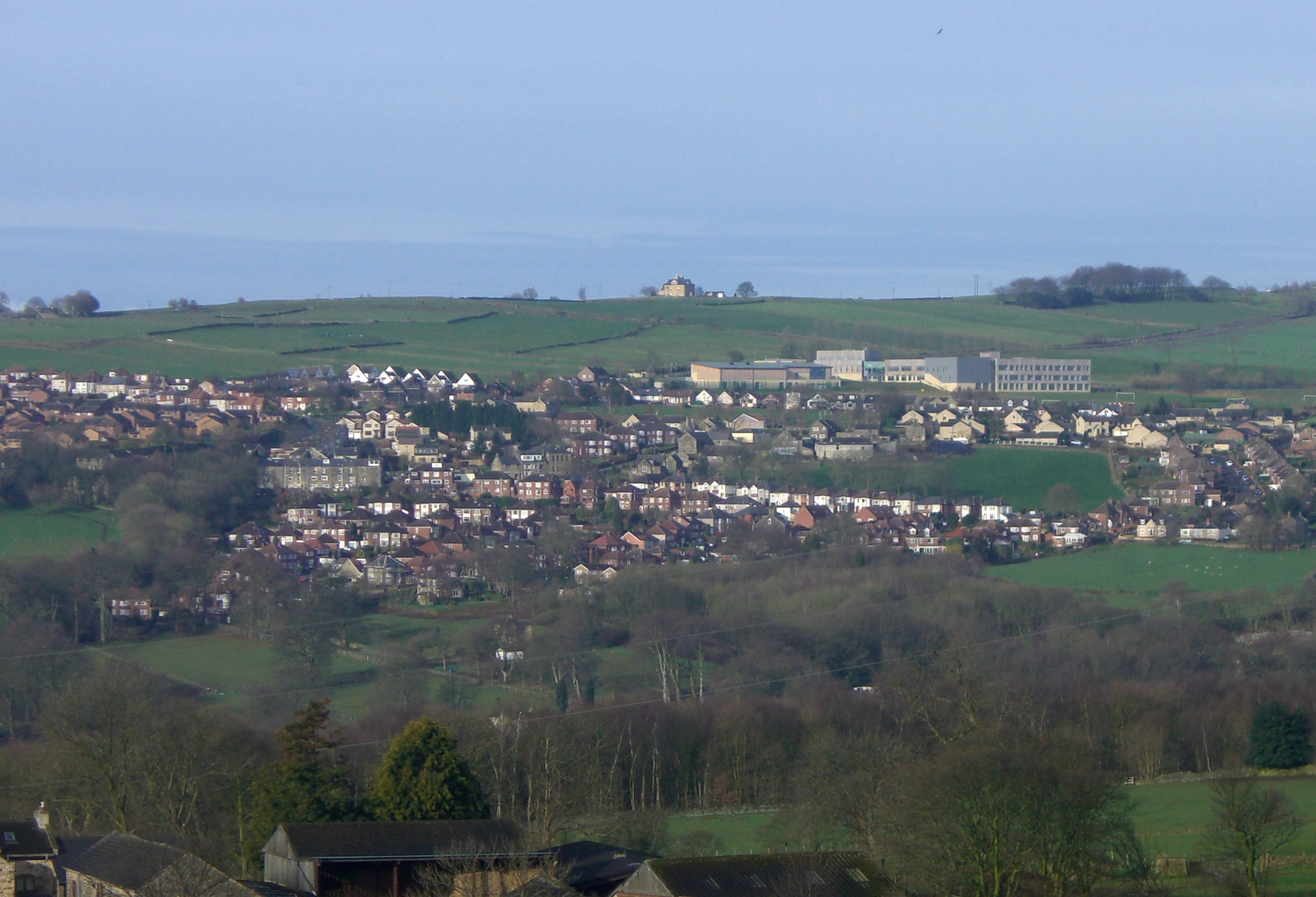
- Seen across the Don valley from Birley edge, two km to the east.

- Location within South Yorkshire
- Population: 1,306 (2006)
- Civil parish: Bradfield
- Metropolitan borough: Sheffield
- Metropolitan county: South Yorkshire
- Region: Yorkshire and the Humber
- Country: England
- Sovereign state: United Kingdom
- Post town: SHEFFIELD
- Postcode district: S35
- Dialling code: 0114
- Police: South Yorkshire
- Fire: South Yorkshire
- Ambulance: Yorkshire
- UK Parliament: Sheffield Hallam

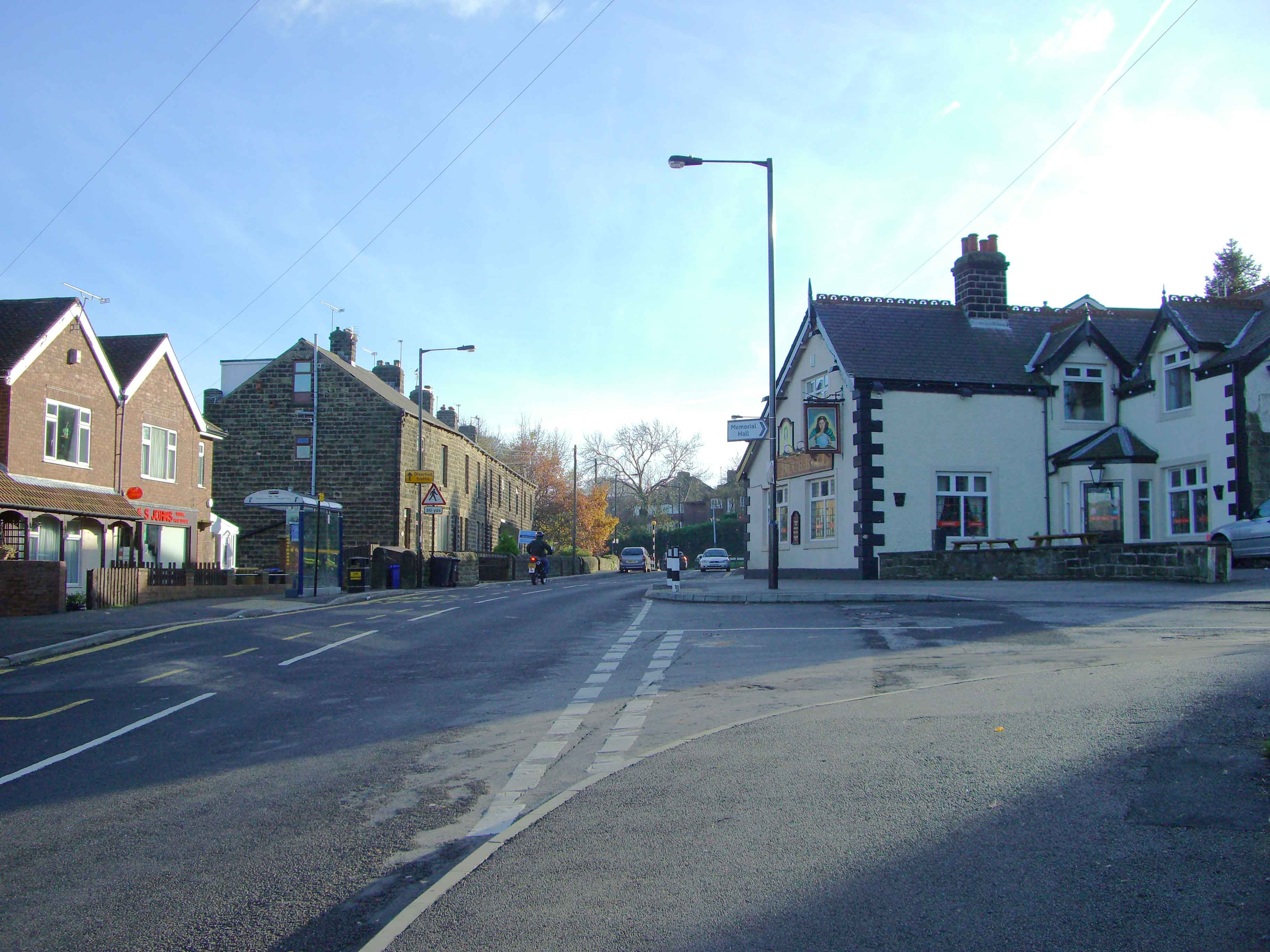
The centre of Worrall with the Blue Ball pub on the right and local shops on the left.

Worrall is a small rural village in the civil parish of Bradfield, South Yorkshire, England, 4 miles (6.5 km) north west of Sheffield city centre. It has an area of 233 hectares, and population of 1,306 as of 2006, and borders the Sheffield suburbs of Wadsley, Middlewood and Loxley to the south and east and the adjoining village of Oughtibridge to the north; to the west is a rural area extending towards the village of High Bradfield.

== History ==
The origins of Worrall go back to Viking times as the names of Towngate Road and Lund Road indicate. Also it is sited away from existing Anglo-Saxon villages such as Wadsley and this was quite common for many Viking settlements. There is no evidence of Anglo-Saxon activity in Worrall. It had its roots in farming and was mentioned in records as part of a manor which also included the areas of Ughill and Wadsley. The manor was held by the Saxon chief Aldene and included 14 bovates of land and an open woodland, a mile square. The villages name derives from the Saxon word Hrivfull meaning "top" and this would certainly apply to Worrall's lofty position above the Don and Loxley valleys.

After the Norman Conquest Worrall was mentioned in the Domesday Book of 1086 as being part of the land held by Roger de Busli. Throughout its history Worrall was closely connected with the nearby village of Wadsley which lies two km to the SW. A certain Geoffrey ("of Worrell") de la Pole, c,1430-1474, is believed to have been associated with Worrall. In 1541 Henry Everingham was named as lord of the manor of both villages in a charter which granted relief from paying certain duties as long as tenants paid their annual rent. The manor of Worrall was transferred to the ownership of Robert Swyft in 1557 and then to Sir Francis Leake before passing into the estates of the Earl of Shrewsbury. In the 18th century the Stead family estate owned properties in Worrall; at his death Thomas Stead (1728–93) owned 16 properties and 2,000 acres (8.1 km^{2}) in various parts of Hallamshire and Sheffield. Throughout this period Worrall was predominantly a farming community.

Worrall developed some small-scale industry at the onset of the Industrial Revolution in the late 18th and early 19th centuries when some small Little Mester workshops were set up to make cutlery and knives. Nearby Wadsley had a reputation for making pocket knives and Worrall found it easier to trade with Wadsley than with the more distant Sheffield.

Ganister mining and quarrying were other industries that grew in the area. Quarrying developed from the middle of the 17th century when there was an expansion of farming in the area and farmhouses and cottages needed to be built for the workers. The biggest quarry in the area was the Middlewood quarry off Mowson Lane which was owned by George Turner. Local historian Joe Castle has suggested that stone from this quarry was used to build the Wicker Arches in Sheffield. The quarry closed at the start of World War II and is now a new housing development. There were three ganister mines in the immediate Worrall area. The Yews Mine and the Langhouse Mine were owned by Charles Bramall, while the Stubbin Mine was owned by the Oughtibridge Silica Firebrick Company and was the last to close in November 1927. The Bramall Company owned 2 silica brickworks in the area - Birtin Works and Caledonia Works, both had closed by 1927.

== Present day ==
Today Worrall is mostly a residential village with a mixture of new and older housing. Most of its working residents commute to their jobs in Sheffield and other areas. There is a higher proportion of older people in the village compared to the rest of Sheffield with 32% of the population aged between 45 and 64. 87% of the houses in Worrall are owner occupied, a high figure compared to the 60% average for Sheffield as a whole. There are still several farms on the periphery of the village but farming is much reduced from the 19 farms that existed in the immediate area in the 1930s. Some such as Lund Farm, Grange Farm and The Yews Farm have been sold for housing development in recent years. The last farm to operate in the centre of Worrall was the Wiggan dairy farm on Towngate Road. Sycamore Park is a public recreation area off Briarfields Lane in the village; it is 1.4 hectares (3.46 acres) in area and has a playground, mini football pitch, cycle track and picnic benches.

=== Significant buildings ===
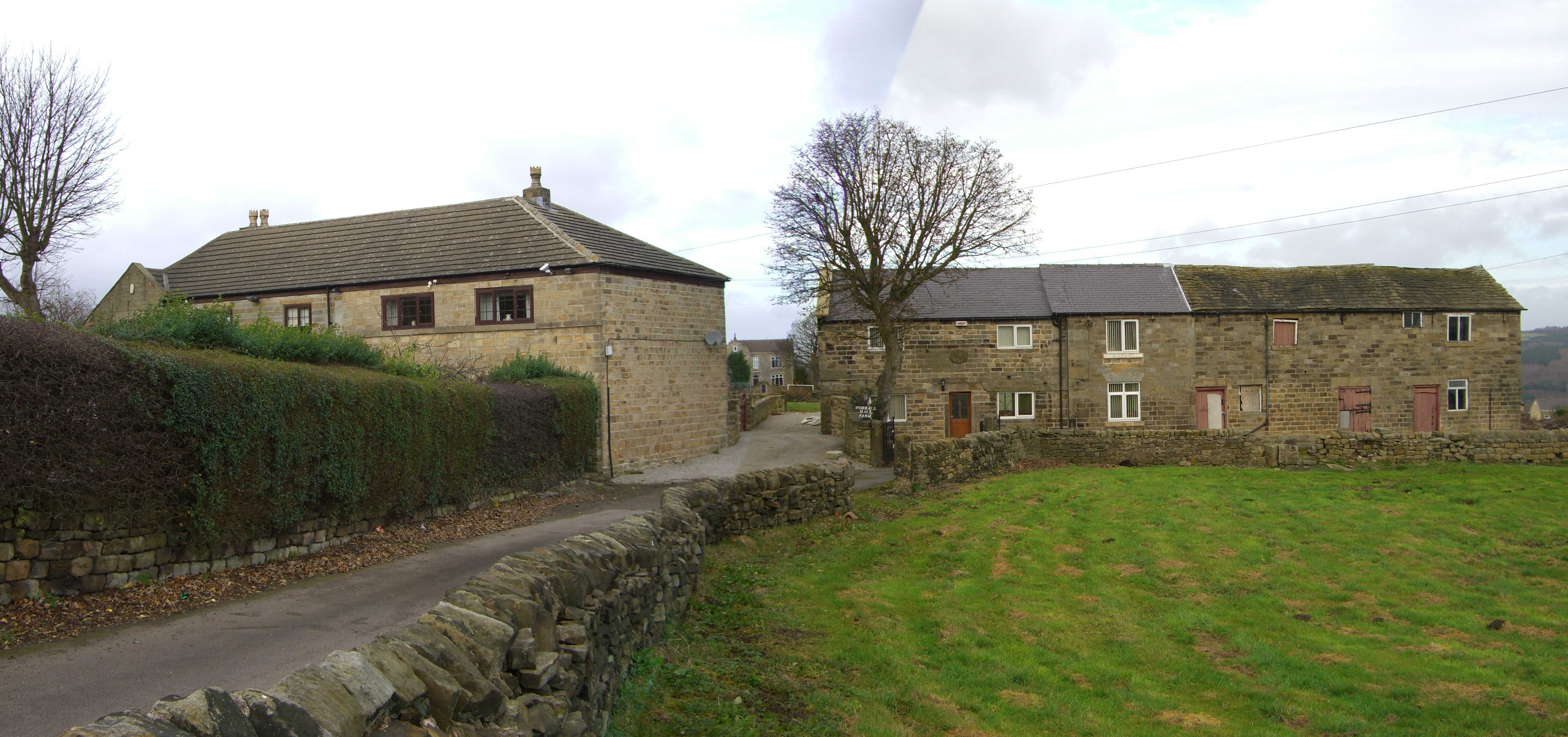
Worrall Hall Farm (right) and Worrall Hall (left).

There are two public houses in the village. The Blue Ball is believed to have been originally two cottages which were connected at some time to make bigger premises. There is no documented date of origin although first licensed in 1825 (Robert Waite 1825-1833 first Landlord). The Shoulder of Mutton was formerly farm buildings but has been a pub since at least 1817, it was modernised in the 1980s.

Worrall Independent Chapel dates from 1878 and has a foundation stone inscribed "This stone was laid by John Wycliffe Wilson of Sheffield July 15th 1878". Worrall National school was founded in 1848 and eventually closed in 1966 with the pupils being transferred to Oughtibridge Primary School; the old school house is now a private residence. Bradfield School, a secondary school for pupils aged between 11 and 16 was built in 1957 on Kirk Edge Road as it leaves the village; there are approximately 1,000 pupils at the school.

Worrall Hall, situated on Kirk Edge Road, is the oldest building in Worrall but it has three distinct sections all of different time periods. The west wing dates from the 16th century while the central section has a date stone of 1720; the eastern section dates from 1820. The Hall was formerly a listed building but was taken off the list in 1985. It is a private house and has undergone renovation work in recent years after becoming run down. The adjoining Worrall Hall Farm has not been a working farm for many years. The Yews is a building located on Worrall Road as it enters the village from the SE. It dates from the 1880s and was formerly a hospital. It was owned by Sheffield Primary Care Trust and was used as offices for the Mental Health Team. Now it has been sold at auction and there is a renovation project to turn it into a £1million plus valued home.

The Worrall Memorial Hall is a venue for local social and fundraising activities; it is situated next to Sycamore Park. Hillsborough Golf Club lies to the south of the village. The course was created in 1920 with the club house added in 1936. Worrall Male Voice Choir was formed on 7 September 1970 and is a highly respected local vocal group which is based in the village; it has a busy schedule of concerts and fund raising activities. The Monastery of The Holy Spirit, known locally as Kirk Edge convent, stands two km to the west of the village. Built in 1871, it was a monastery of the Carmelite order of nuns until it closed in October 2024.

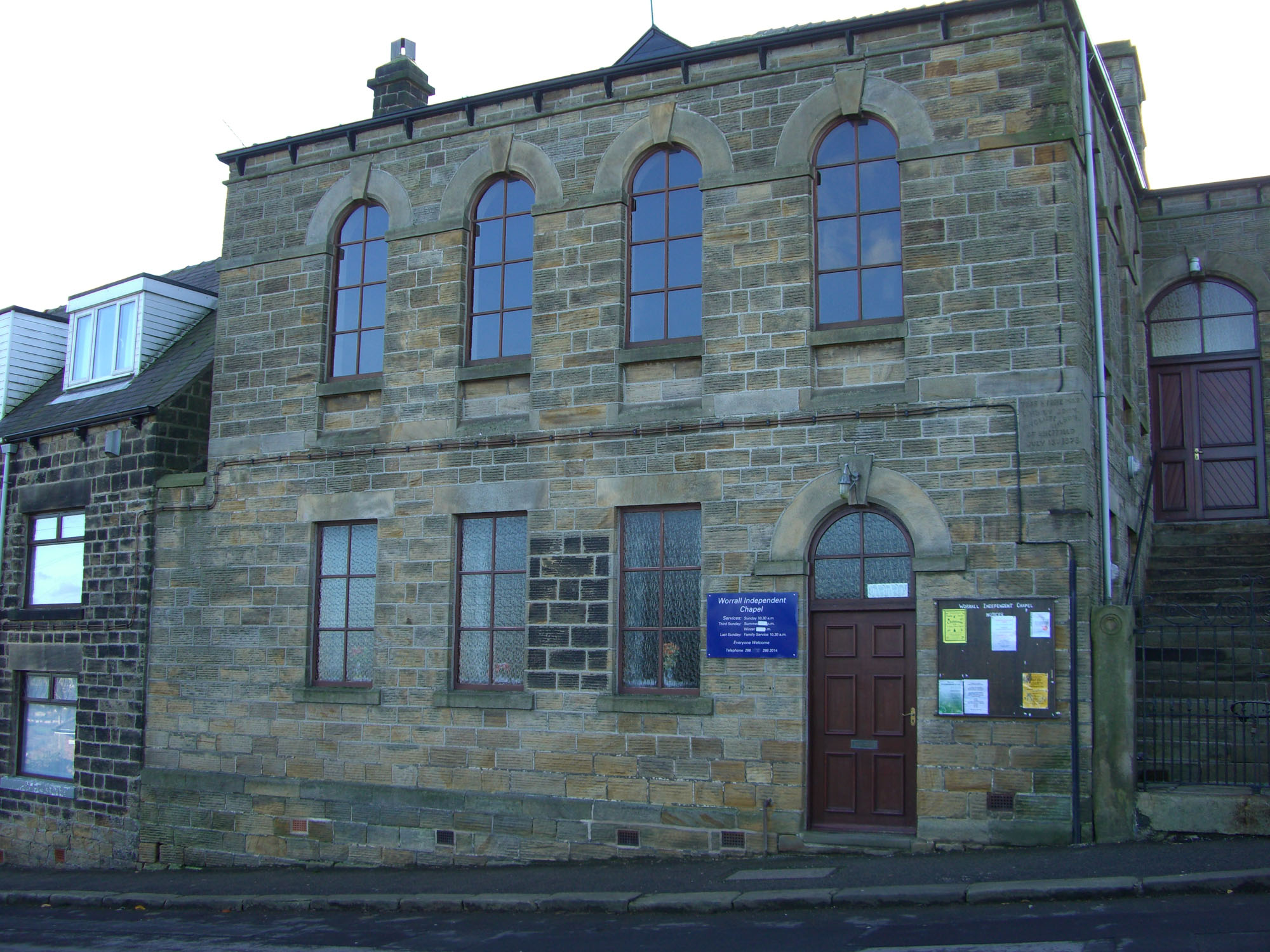
Worrall Independent Chapel on Towngate Road (built 1878)

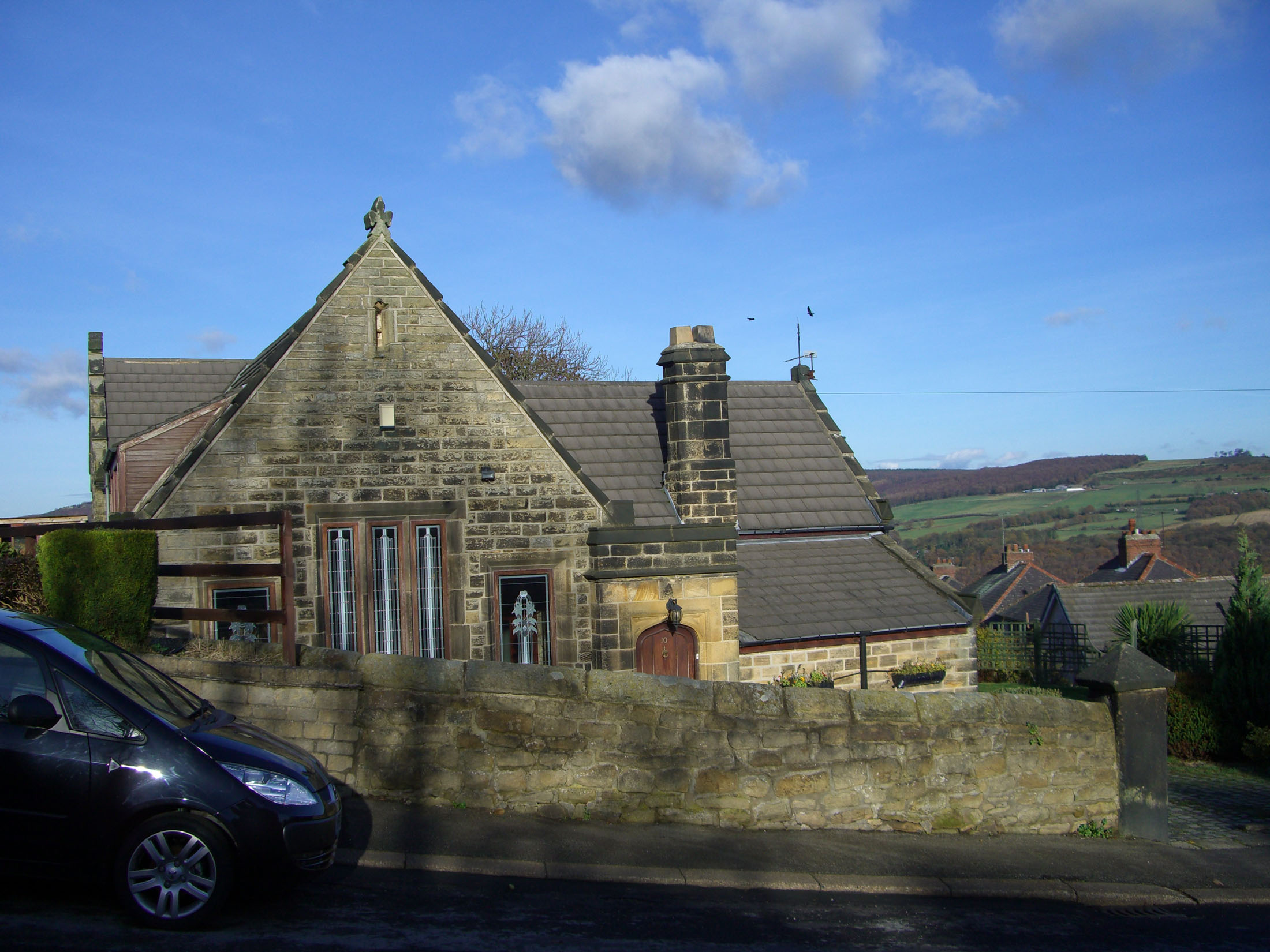
The old school house is now a private residence

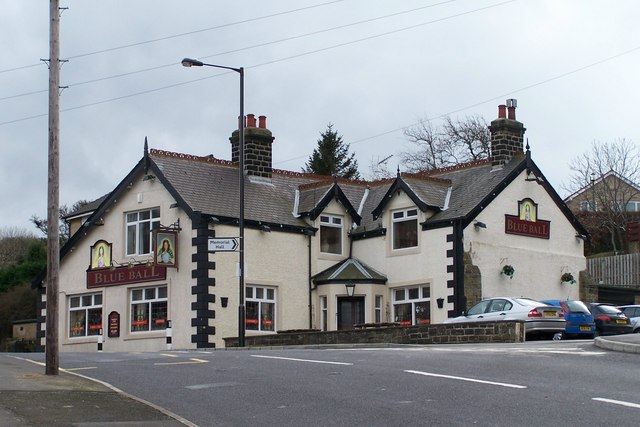
The Blue Ball pub

== Notable residents ==
Stan Shaw, a knife maker and little mester, was born here.
