= Bradfield Church =

Church in Sheffield, South Yorkshire, England

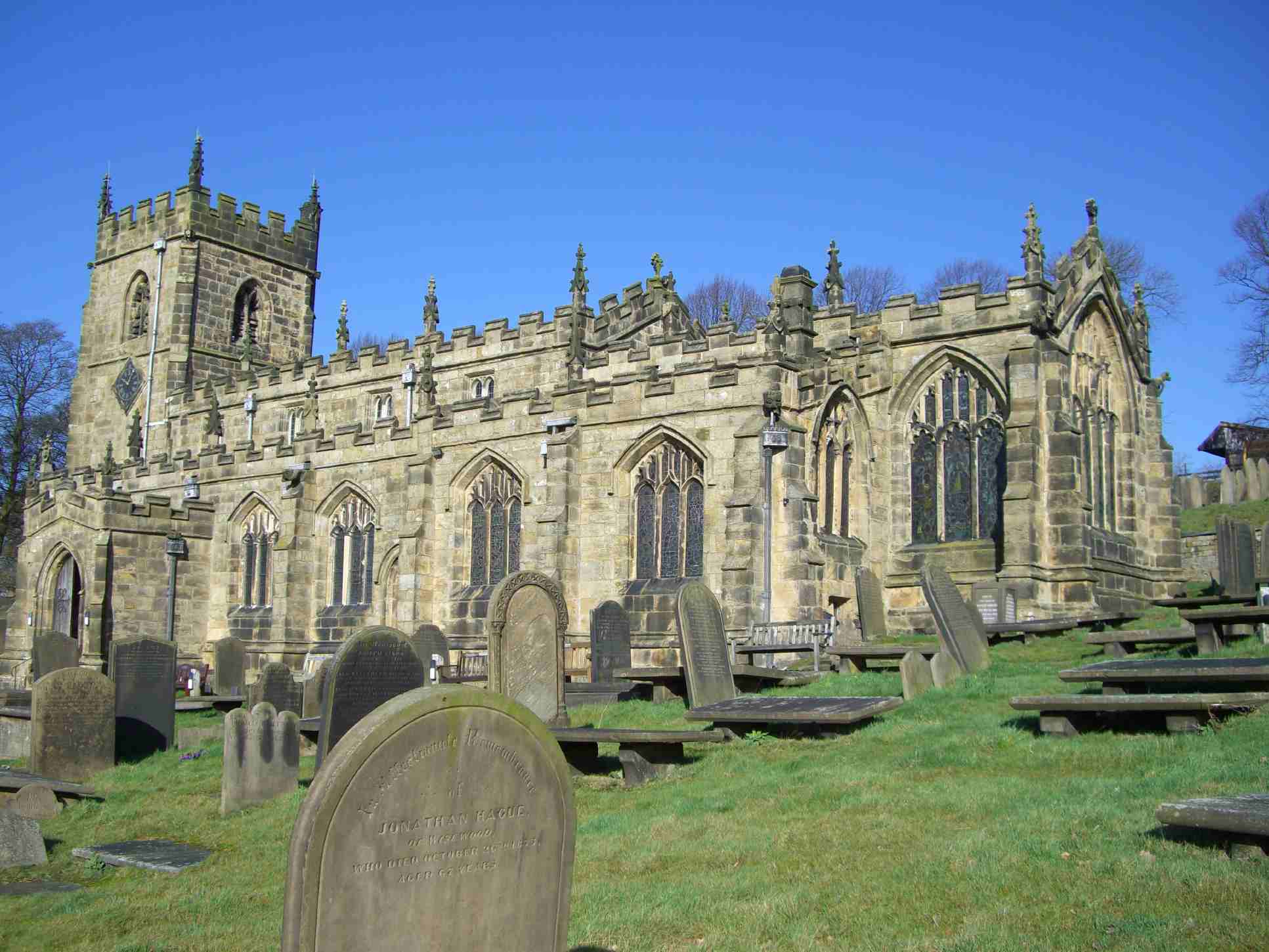
- Bradfield Church
- 53.42844°N 1.5961°W
- OS grid reference: SK 26718 92542
- Denomination: Church of England

Administration
- Diocese: Diocese of Sheffield
- Parish: Bradfield

Bradfield Church is situated in the small village of High Bradfield, (Grid Reference SK268924) which is located 6 miles (10 km) north west of the centre of the city of Sheffield in South Yorkshire, England. It is one of only five Grade One listed buildings in Sheffield. The church is situated 260 metres (850 ft) above sea level, overlooking the Peak District National Park.

== History ==
=== Anglo-Saxon ===
Christian worship in the Bradfield area dates from at least the 9th century, as a Saxon cross discovered in 1870 in the nearby village of Low Bradfield was dated by specialists to that time. Local historian John Wilson (1719–83) believed that the original Norman church was founded in 1109 when deciphering ancient writing in the church's original east window. The Normans regarded the area around Bradfield as strategically important and had built a motte-and-bailey fortified keep in the area after the conquest. William de Lovetot, Lord of Hallamshire, had built the Church of St. Mary, Ecclesfield, nine kilometres to the east, at the end of the 11th century, to which St. Nicholas, Bradfield became a chapel of ease until 1868, when it became a parish of its own.

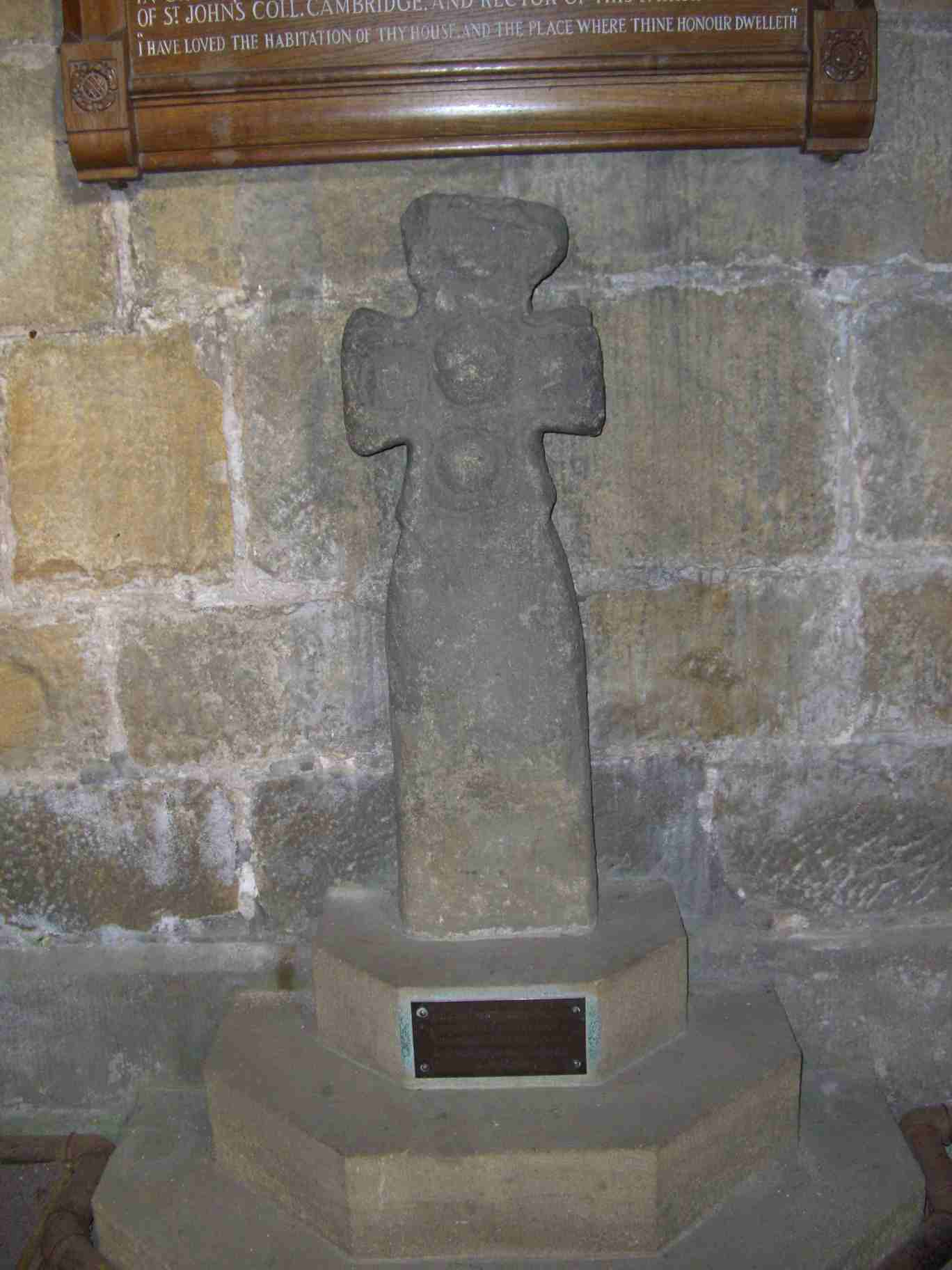
The Saxon cross stands against the north wall of the nave and is believed to date from the tenth century.

The original Norman church was an uncomplicated two cell building. A square bell tower was added in the 14th century before it was largely rebuilt in the Gothic Perpendicular style during the 1480s, using some of the original masonry which consisted of local gritstone. The interior of the church changed drastically under the influence of the Puritans during the English Civil War, when statues, wall paintings and stained glass were destroyed and the walls whitewashed.

=== 19th century ===
These changes were reversed in the latter part of the 19th century when the interior was restored to its 15th-century appearance. Parts of the original Norman church survive in the north arcade, the font and the chancel arch. The previously mentioned 9th century Saxon cross was integrated into the north wall of the church in 1886. The cross is roughly fashioned in local gritstone and is simply decorated with five bosses on the head, which was the Saxon way of depicting the crucifixion. Records of births, marriages and burials date from 1559. Music in the church was originally provided by a local band of musicians featuring a bassoon and violoncello accompanying the choir. The musicians were replaced in 1843 by an organ. The present organ was installed in 1973. It was built by Laycock and Bannister and was bought second hand from a church in Middlesbrough that was closing.

== Today ==
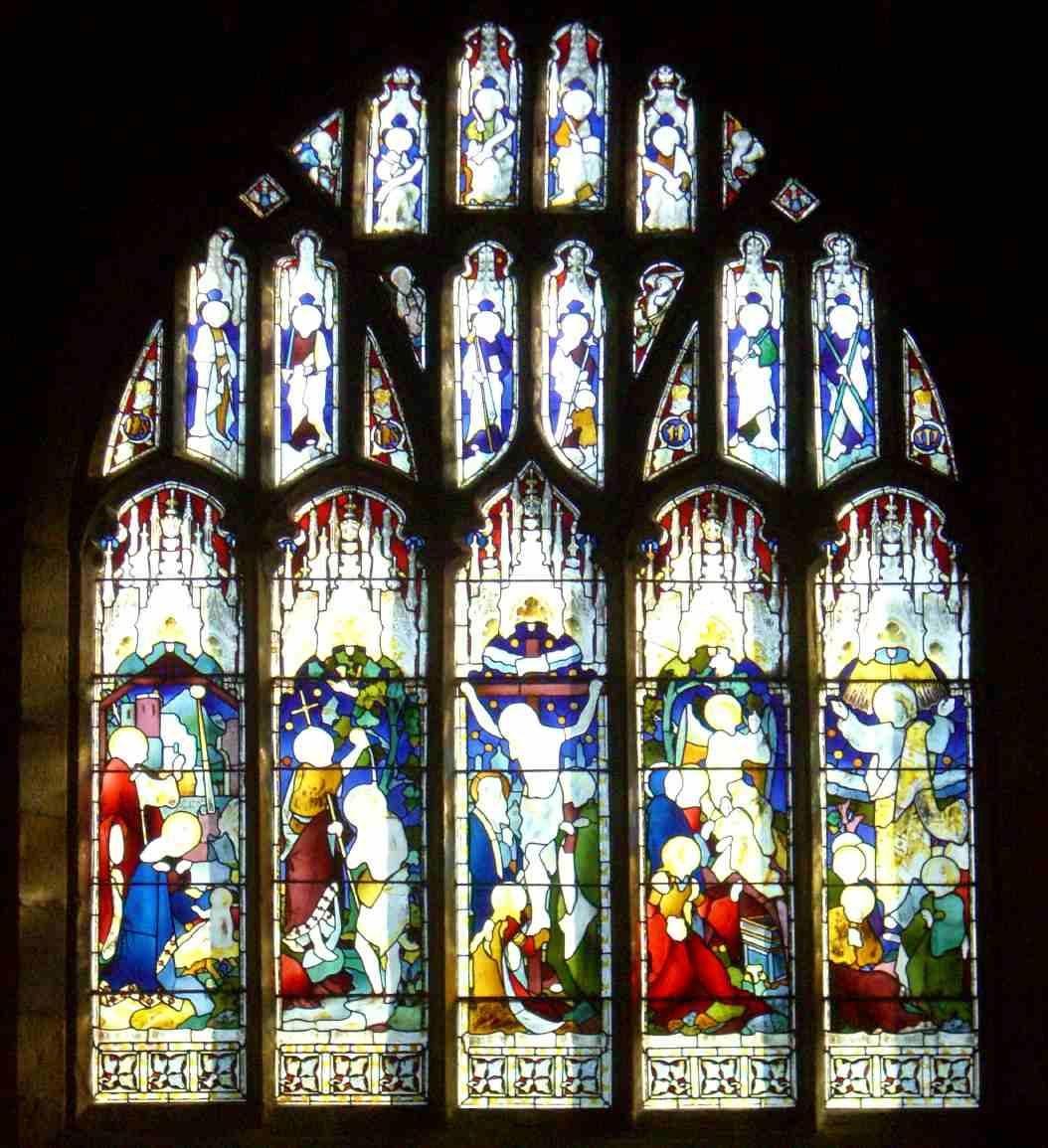
The East window was made by the John Hardman studio in Birmingham

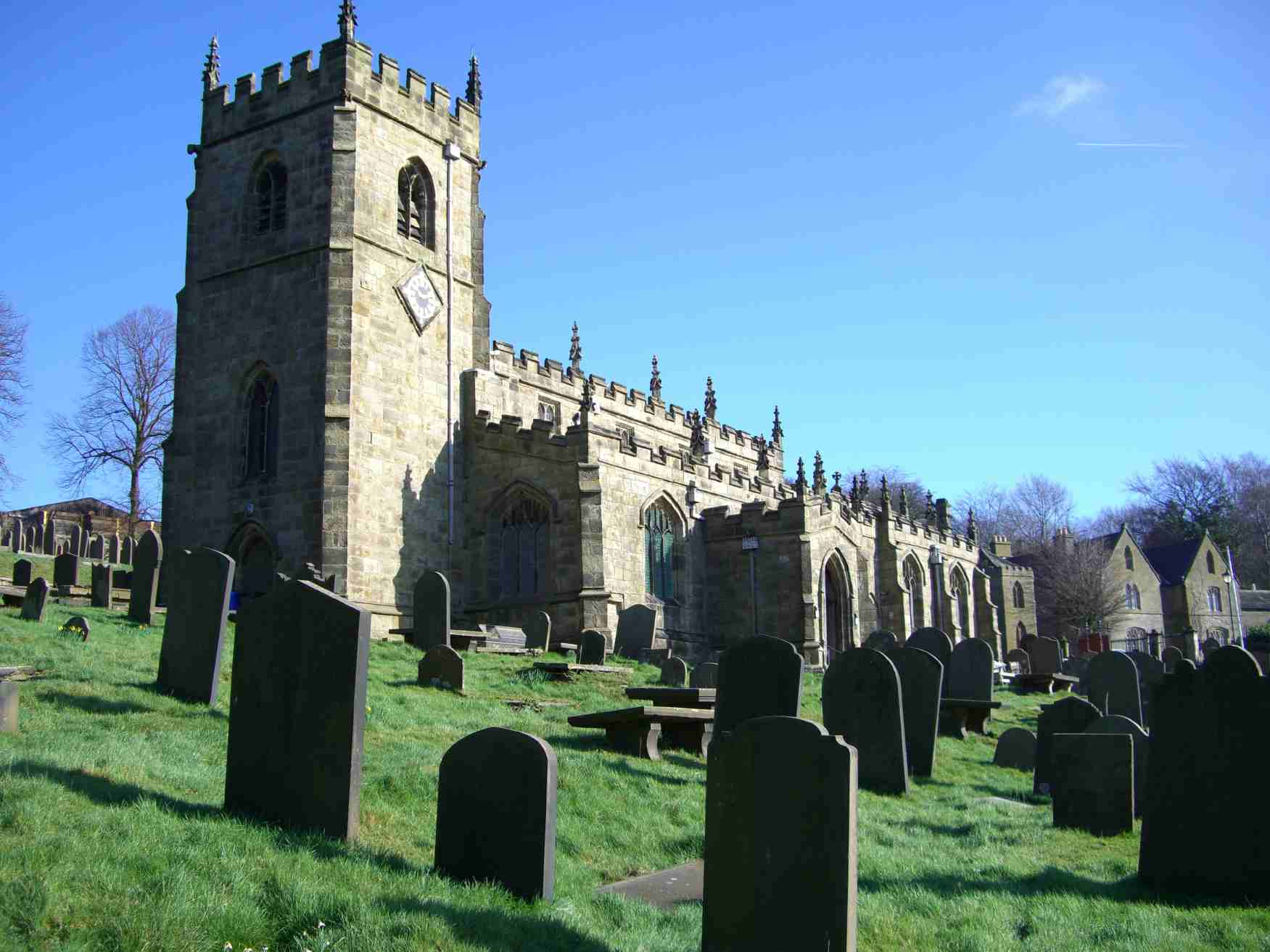

=== Windows ===
The interior contains 17 stained glass windows of varying sizes. Much of the glass is from the late 19th century although the Medieval Window includes fragments of glass from the 15th century. During the Second World War it was stored in a local clay mine to protect it from bomb damage. The windows include designs by Sir John Ninian Comper, Clayton and Bell and Hardman & Co. The east window, which is the largest, was donated by the Wilson family in 1870, and depicts the nativity, baptism, crucifixion, resurrection and ascension of Christ. A window on the west wall was donated by the Dixon family in 1930. The family had been the owners of the Spring Grove paper mill in Oughtibridge since 1871. The main west window is situated in the ringing chamber of the tower. It was a gift of James Wilson Rimington-Wilson (1822–77) of Broomhead Hall and depicts Saint Nicholas and Saint Cuthbert. It is one of ten windows in the church attributed to William Francis Dixon (1848–1928) of the Clayton & Bell company.

=== Interior ===
The pulpit features carved panels portraying Christ with the four Gospel writers. Oak panels brought from Normandy in 1886 decorate the sanctuary and the altar. The interior has a Camber beam roof with the wall posts having carved feet and various embossing. The original Norman baptismal font is still in place; it is made of magnesian limestone with no decoration at all and is believed to have been built and presented by the Cistercian monks of Roche Abbey in the 12th century. A sunken vestry was discovered and refurbished during the 19th century: this is thought to have been used by visiting clergy as sleeping quarters during inclement weather.

=== Memorial ===
The church features memorials to the Bradfield men who perished in both World wars. A slate plaque presented by the local water authority in 1989 stands in the south aisle and commemorates the Great Sheffield Flood of 1864, when the nearby Dale Dike Reservoir broke and 270 people drowned. A number of flood victims are buried in the churchyard. The grave of William Horsfield, who discovered the crack in the embankment of the dam, is located in the churchyard. He died in 1881.

=== Bell Tower ===
The bell tower contains a peal of eight bells made by John Taylor Bellfounders of Loughborough. Six were cast in 1847, while two more were added in 1996. Records show Bradfield's bells were not only rung on Sundays but also to commemorate events of national importance, such as on 5 November "for the Gunpowder Treason" and from 1660 onwards on 29 May (Oak Apple Day) to celebrate The Restoration. The irregularly shaped watch house which stands by the main gates was built in 1745 to guard against grave robbers looking for fresh corpses for medical study, with friends and relatives of the deceased often guarding the recently buried loved ones with guns. It is the only surviving watch house in Yorkshire, and today it is a private dwelling. When Bradfield village lost its church hall in 1987, the rear pews of the church were removed to provide a meeting place and kitchen.

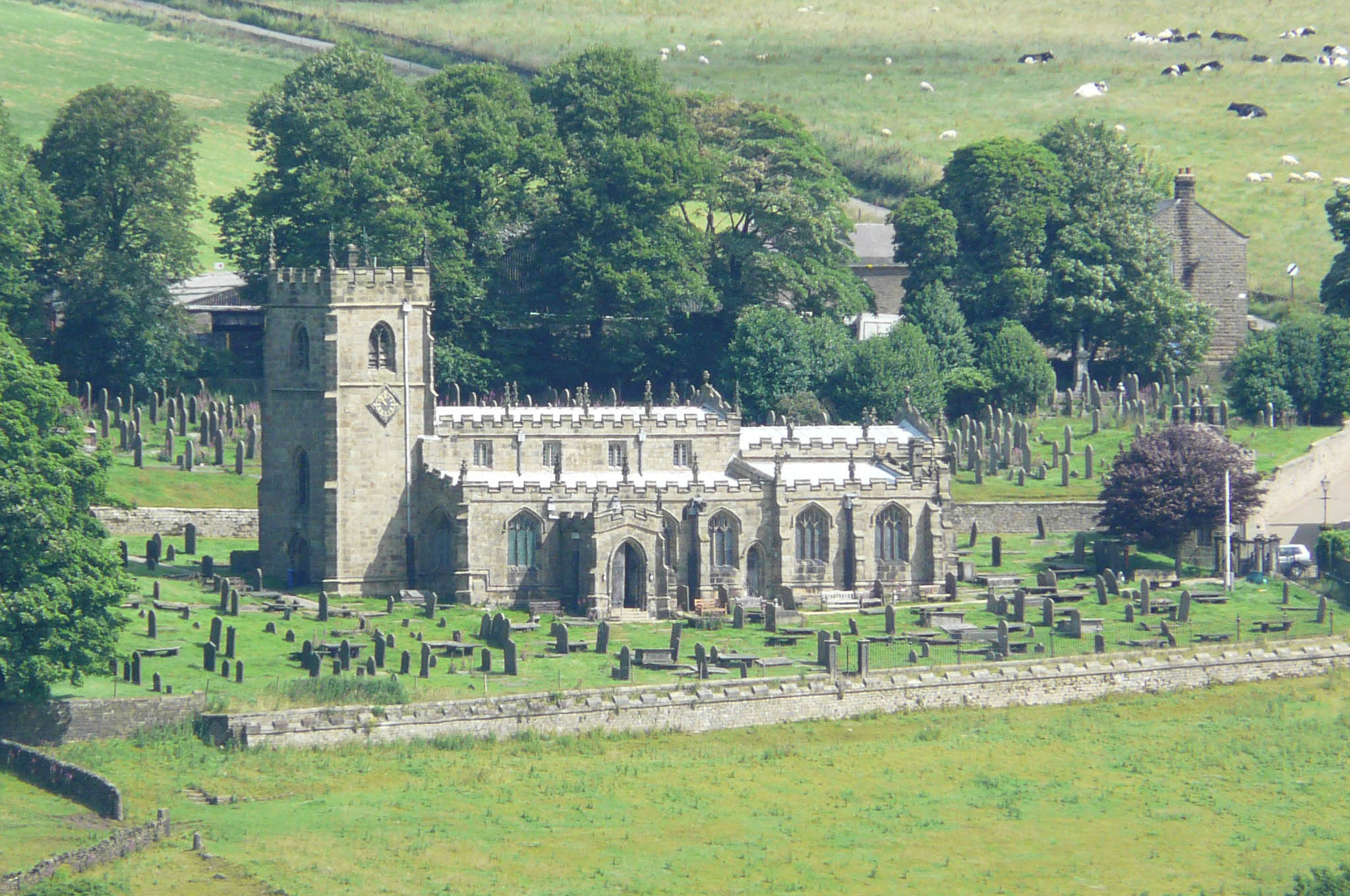
Seen from the high ground 0.9 miles (1.5 km) to the south

== References and footnotes ==
- The Parish Church of St Nicholas, Bradfield (booklet), John and Julia Hatfield
- The Parish Church of St Nicholas, Bradfield; A Brief History and Guide (Leaflet)
