= River Don Engine =

Preserved stationary steam engine

Coordinates: 53.389503°N 1.472345°W

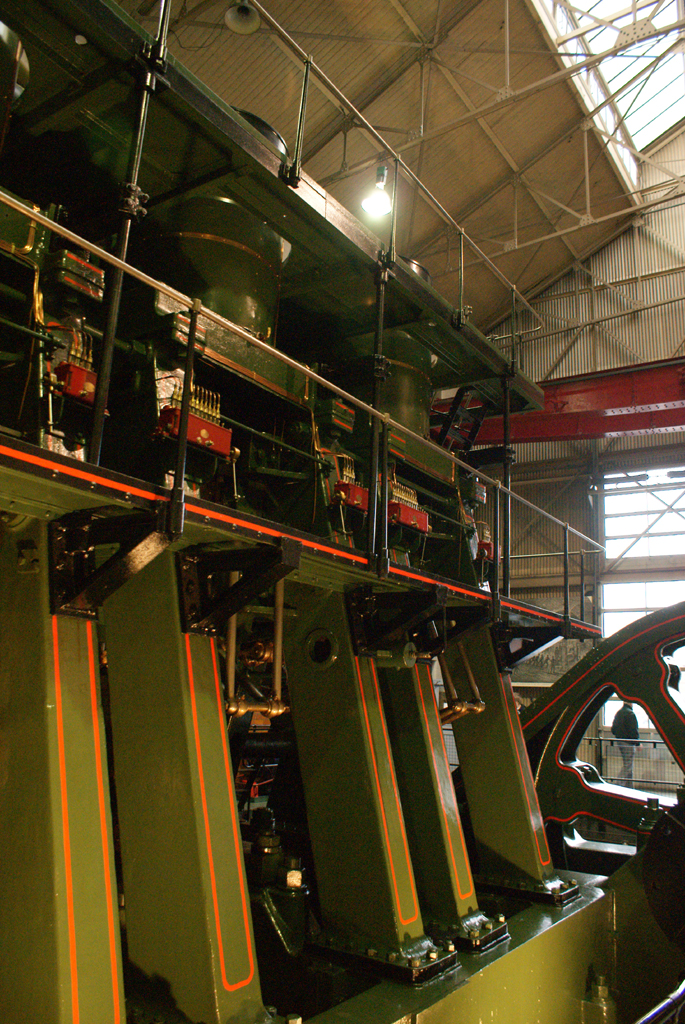
River Don Engine - Kelham Island Museum

The River Don engine running under zero load

The River Don Engine is a 1904-built steam engine used for hot rolling steel armour plate. It is a 3-cylinder simple engine of 40 inches (1.0 m) diameter, 48 inches (1.2 m) stroke. At its operating steam pressure of 160psi, it developed 12,000 horsepower (8.9 MW), and was able to reverse from full speed in 2 seconds. The rapid reverse was an essential feature of an engine used for rolling, as delays would result in cooling of the workpiece. This engine was one of four built to the same design, one going overseas to the Japanese Government, one to John Brown's Atlas plant, one to William Beardmore of Glasgow and one which stayed in Sheffield at Cammell's mill. It is claimed to be one of the most powerful steam engines ever built, and the most powerful remaining in Europe.

The River Don Engine worked for over 50 years at Cammell's mill before being moved first to British Steel's River Don plant (hence its name) and then in 1978 to its present home at the Kelham Island Museum, Sheffield. The engine was last used for commercial work in the 1970s, to roll out reactor shield plates for nuclear power plants.

The engine is normally regularly demonstrated at the museum, without load, and under 100 psi of steam pressure. It had to be taken out of service following the floods of July 2007, which extensively damaged the museum and parts of the engine, but was restored to working order in 2008.
