= Hordron Edge stone circle =

Stone circle on Moscar Moor in Derbyshire, England

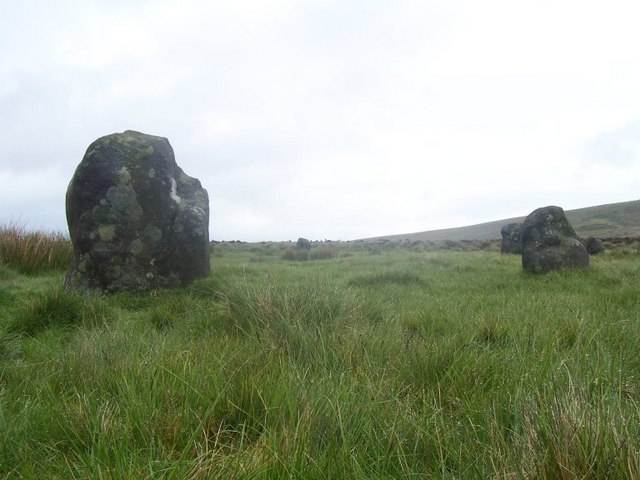
- Part of Hordron Edge stone circle

- Location in Derbyshire
- 53°22′41″N 1°40′41″W
- Type: Stone circle
- Periods: Bronze Age
- Location: Derbyshire

Hordron Edge stone circle, also known as 'The Seven Stones of Hordron', is a Bronze Age stone circle (grid reference SK2152486851) in Derbyshire, England. It is on the edge of Moscar Moor. Ladybower reservoir is to the west, and Moscar Cross is to the northeast. Seven stones are presently (2017) visible with a further three stones, now recumbent and hidden, discovered in 1992. Some authorities believe that the circle might have once comprised 26 stones.

The stone circle is approximately 15 to 16 m (49 to 52 ft) in diameter, with eleven stones between 45 cm and 95 cm high extant upright.
