= Stan Shaw (cutler) =

English cutler (1926–2021)

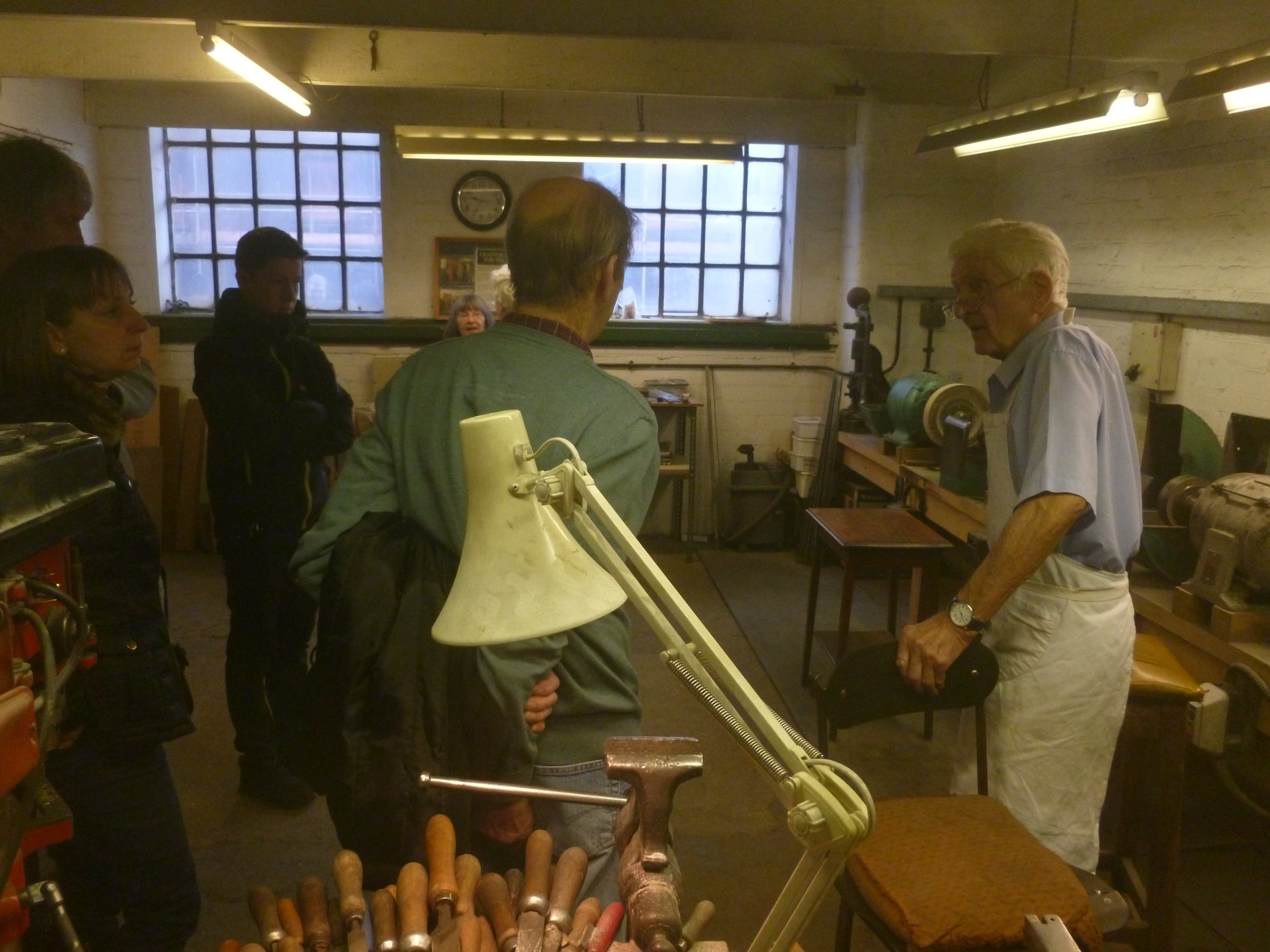
- Shaw (furthest right) at his workshop in the Kelham Island Museum, 2014
- Born: 2 December 1926; Worrall, Sheffield
- Died: 26 February 2021 (aged 94)
- Occupation: Knife maker
- Spouse: Rosemary Shaw
- Children: Jane; Andrew; Kevin
- Parents: Walter Shaw (father); Amelia Shaw (mother)

Stan Shaw (2 December 1926 - 26 February 2021) was a cutler, or "little mester", from Sheffield, England.

== Early life ==
Shaw was born in Worrall, Sheffield to Walter Shaw and Amelia Shaw (nee Coldwell). He was one of eight children. His family later moved to Oughtibridge. His father was a ganister miner and died from silicosis at the age of 45. At the age of four, Shaw fell from a roof and landed on his hip. He subsequently also became ill with tuberculosis and spent ten years in hospital.

== Career ==
Following discharge from hospital, Shaw began working for George Ibberson & Co, where he worked on hafting and finishing items of cutlery. Shaw subsequently worked for George Wostenholm, John Watts, and John Clarke. In 1983, Shaw set up his own business in Garden Street. In 2009, he moved to a workshop within the Kelham Island Museum. Towards the end of his career, he had a four-year waiting list for orders.

== Retirement and death ==
Shaw stopped producing knives in 2019 due to ill health but continued to demonstrate his craftmanship to the public at the Kelham Island Museum. He died on 26 February 2021, at the age of 94. A commemorative plaque by sculptor Gordon Young was installed outside Cutlers' Hall in 2022. In May 2024, two busts were unveiled, with one on display at the Cutlers Hall, and the other at his former workshop at Kelham Island.
