= High Bradfield =

Village in South Yorkshire, England

Coordinates: 53.4288°N 1.5981°W

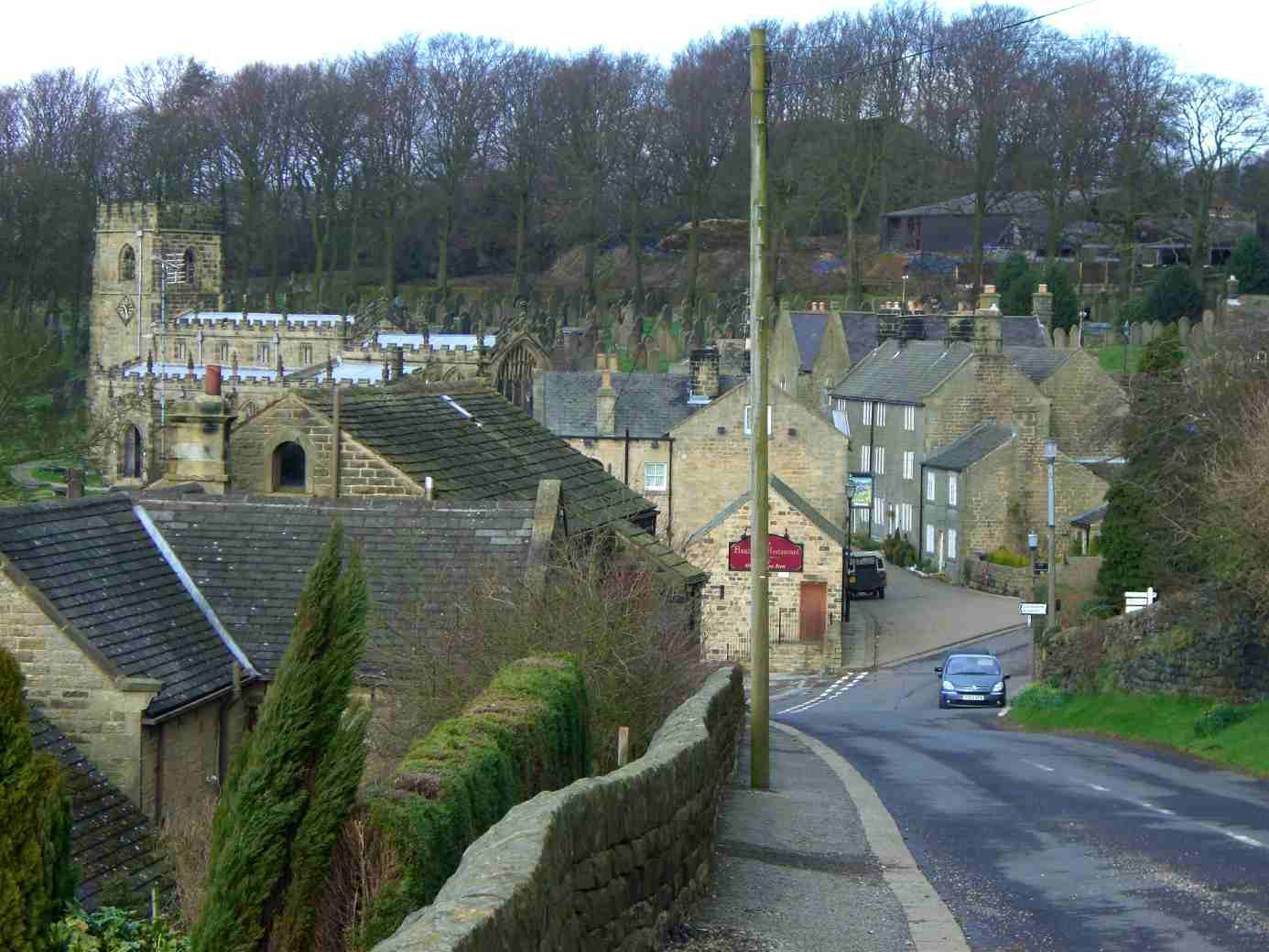
- High Bradfield village dominated by the Church of St. Nicholas, Bradfield

- Location within Sheffield
- Civil parish: Bradfield
- Metropolitan borough: City of Sheffield
- Metropolitan county: South Yorkshire
- Region: Yorkshire and the Humber
- Country: England
- Sovereign state: United Kingdom
- Post town: SHEFFIELD
- Postcode district: S6
- Dialling code: 0114
- Police: South Yorkshire
- Fire: South Yorkshire
- Ambulance: Yorkshire
- UK Parliament: Sheffield Hallam

High Bradfield is a rural village 6.5 miles (10 km) north-west of the centre of Sheffield in South Yorkshire, England and within the city's boundaries. The village lies just within the Peak District National Park, 1.3 miles (2 km) inside the park's north-eastern border, is at an altitude of 260 metres (850 feet) AOD, and has extensive views across Bradfield Dale towards Derwent Edge and the Dark Peak.

The most striking feature of the village is the medieval Church of St. Nicholas, Bradfield. It is one of only five Grade I Listed buildings in Sheffield.

The name Bradfield failed to shift during the Great Vowel Shift from Old English to Broadfield, a name with a double emphasis on its broad stretch of open countryside. and the area around the village is predominantly grazing land with dairy and sheep farming dominating. High Bradfield has a sister village, Low Bradfield, which lies less than 0.7 miles (1 km) to the south-west but is lower down in the upper Loxley valley. The two villages are linked by the steep Woodfall Lane.

High Bradfield is in the civil parish of Bradfield, the largest in England, and in the electoral area of Stannington.

== History ==
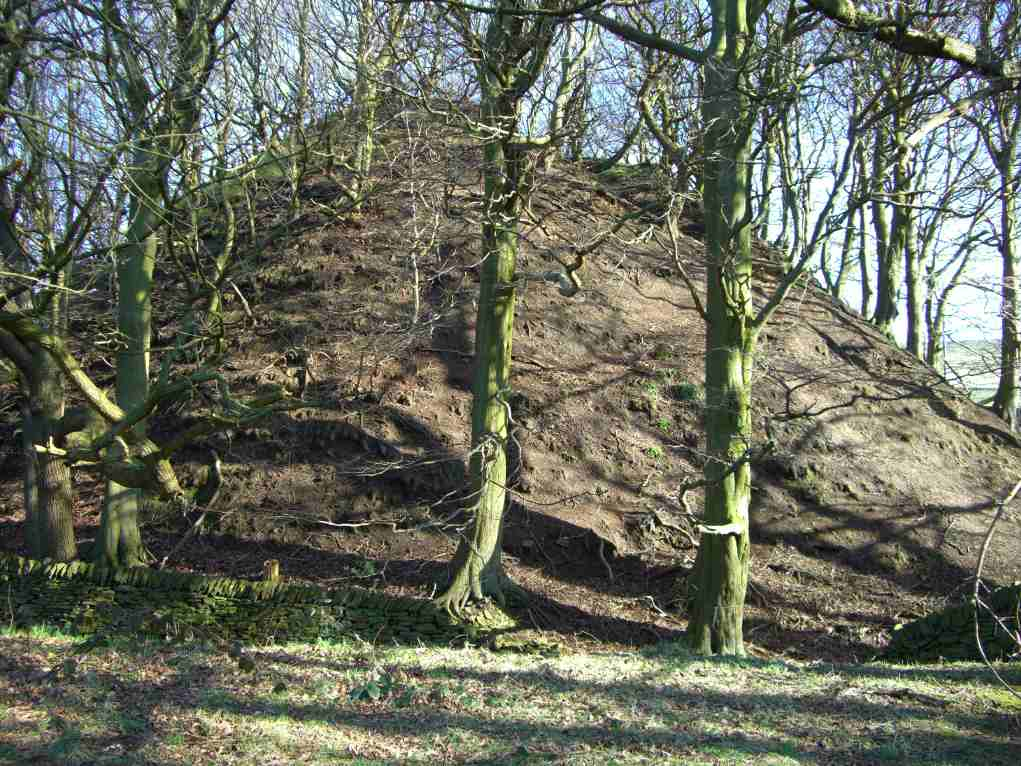
Bailey Hill is believed to have been the site of a Norman motte-and-bailey castle.

High Bradfield, which was formerly known as kirkton, is not mentioned in the Domesday Book, but it may have been one of the 16 hamlets recorded in the manor of Hallam. On the north-west edge of the village, close to the church, is Bailey Hill, an approximately 10.5-metre (34 ft) high man-made conical mound that is a Scheduled Ancient Monument. The date and purpose of its construction are unknown, though it has been interpreted as a Saxon fort, a Norman motte-and-bailey castle, or a place of public village assembly. The late David Hey said there was no doubt that Bailey Hill is a motte-and-bailey castle calling it "One of the best preserved and most dramatic motte-and-baileys in Yorkshire." Excavations from 1720 revealed squared stones that had been produced by using tools. The eastern and southern flanks of the bailey are enclosed by a 95 metre long curving earthwork while to the west it is protected by steep slopes. About 500 metres (1,600 ft) to the southeast of the village is Castle Hill, a site marked on old maps as a “supposed Saxon encampment” The site occupies a rocky ridge at the head of a high escarpment partially enclosed by ring work. The date or purpose of construction of this site are also unknown although it has been speculated that it was used a look-out post.

The parish church, St Nicholas Church, is built in the Gothic Perpendicular style and dates from the 1480s. It incorporates elements of an earlier church that may have been built in the 12th century, and it may stand on the site of an Anglo-Saxon place of worship.

The Enclosure Act of the early 19th century altered the appearance of the countryside around High Bradfield as the profusion of stones in the soil resulted in many small fields in the area. Around the same time many people in the Bradfield area were influenced by the Industrial Revolution and moved to nearby Sheffield to improve their standard of living. The Bradfield Parish workhouse was based in High Bradfield between 1759 and 1847; the building is still there today, standing across the road from the Old Horns pub on Towngate. The building was converted into private houses in the 1870s. Thousands of documents relating to the workhouse were found in a hidden cupboard in one of the houses in the 1950s; these are now in the Bradfield Parish Archives. On Jane Street is the Grade II listed building known as the Old Post Office, built from gritstone with a slate roof in 1835. It was originally an inn called Heaven House or Heaven's Gate and later The Cross Daggers. Later it served as a register office, vestry and school and latterly as a post office; it is now a private dwelling divided into several flats.

=== Present day ===
The present-day village is still dominated by farming. Church Farm is a large dairy farm which supplies a large amount of milk for the surrounding area. Watt House Farm is also a dairy farm but is unique in that it is the home of the Bradfield Brewery, which is based in a converted barn on the farm. It brews several beers including Farmers Blonde and Pale Ale as well as some seasonal specials. There is one public house in the village, the Old Horns Inn. The Monastery of The Holy Spirit, known locally as Kirk Edge Convent, stands 1.5 km to the east of the village, it is a monastery of the Carmelite order of nuns.

The Peak District Boundary Walk runs through the village.
