= Bradfield School =

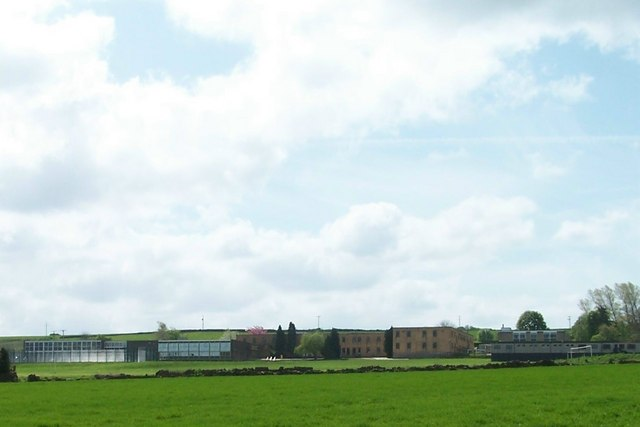
- View of the school grounds

Location
- Kirk Edge Road; Worrall; Sheffield, South Yorkshire, S35 0AE; England; 53.42418°N 1.54499°W

Information
- Type: Academy
- Motto: Inspire, Learn, Transform
- Established: 1957
- Local authority: City of Sheffield
- Specialist: Engineering
- Department for Education URN: 139101 Tables
- Ofsted: Reports
- Executive headteacher: Dale Barrowclough
- Head teacher: Anna Hughes
- Gender: Co-educational
- Age: 11 to 16
- Enrolment: 980 (2007)
- Website: https://www.bradfield.sheffield.sch.uk

Bradfield School is a secondary school with academy status situated on the edge of the village of Worrall, in the civil parish of Bradfield, in Sheffield, South Yorkshire, England. The school is a specialist Engineering College formerly catering for pupils between the ages of 11 and 18. However, as of September 2019, the school's sixth form has closed down and the school now only caters to between the ages of 11 and 16.

== Curriculum ==
At Key Stage 4 Bradfield provides students with a broad and balanced curriculum in line with the National Curriculum. All students take Citizenship (Half GCSE), English Language (One GCSE), English Literature (One GCSE), ICT (One GCSE), Mathematics (One GCSE), Physical Education (One GCSE), and Religious Education (Half GCSE) and Science Double Award (Two GCSEs).

== Achievements ==
=== 2006 ===
The Bradfield Panthers, an F1 In Schools team won the British national finals.
