= Moscar Cross =

Guidestone in England

Coordinates: 53.391°N 1.653°W

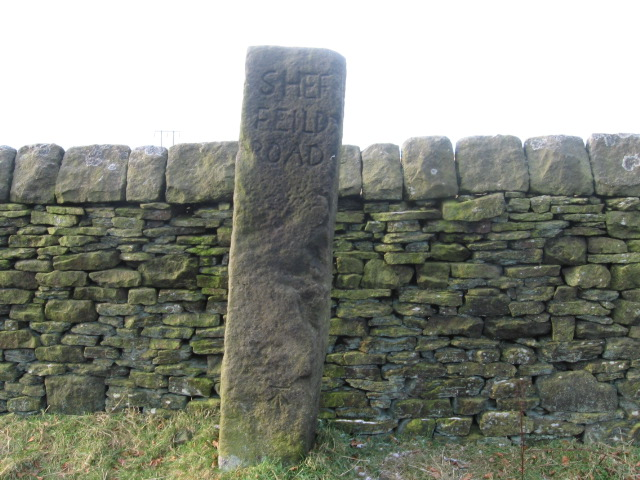
18th century stone with inscription, and benchmark

Moscar Cross is the name of a standing stone (or "guide stoop") and surrounding area in the Peak District on the border between Derbyshire and Sheffield, England.

Moscar moor is located south of the cross, and contains a stone circle, Hordron Edge stone circle.

== Moscar Cross ==
The current Moscar Cross (also known as "Humblestone Cross"; grid reference SK231883), is a guide stoop erected in the 18th century, at a parish boundary and packhorse track junction. It is thought a cross existed at the point during earlier periods. The name 'Moscar' is thought to derive from to 'moss' (mos) and 'carr' (kjarr) both referring to marshy areas. Moscar Cross has been claimed as the location of 'Whitcross' in Charlotte Brontë's novel Jane Eyre.
