= Bradfield, South Yorkshire =

Civil parish in South Yorkshire, England

Coordinates: 53.429°N 1.598°W

Bradfield
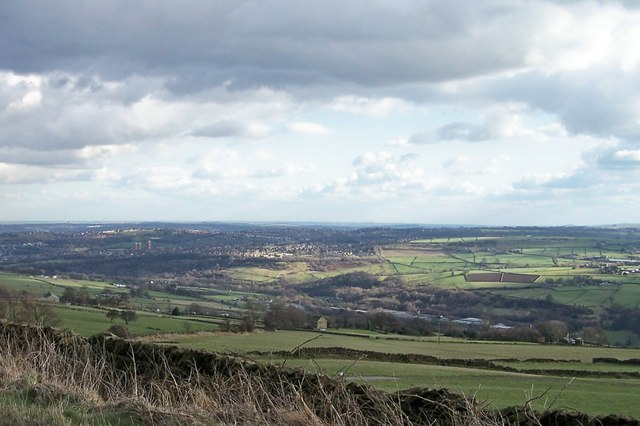
- View of the Loxley Valley in Bradfield parish

- Location within South Yorkshire
- Population: 17,100 (2011 census)
- OS grid reference: SK 251 916
- Civil parish: Bradfield
- Metropolitan borough: Sheffield
- Metropolitan county: South Yorkshire
- Region: Yorkshire and the Humber
- Country: England
- Sovereign state: United Kingdom
- Post town: SHEFFIELD
- Postcode district: S6
- Dialling code: 0114
- Police: South Yorkshire
- Fire: South Yorkshire
- Ambulance: Yorkshire
- UK Parliament: Sheffield Hallam

Bradfield is a civil parish in the City of Sheffield, in South Yorkshire, England.

The civil parish is extensive: the western half is situated in the moorlands of the Peak District, while the eastern half is in lower agricultural land and contains the parish's significant habitations, which include the Sheffield suburb of Stannington, as well as Oughtibridge and Worrall, and the villages of High Bradfield and Low Bradfield. The parish also includes several reservoirs, and a number of minor settlements, such as Ewden. Bradfield is located 8 miles (13 km) from Sheffield city centre and 14 miles (23 km) from Barnsley.

On 6 July 2014, Stage 2 of the 2014 Tour de France from York to Sheffield, passed through the village. It was also the location of the seventh climb of the stage, the Category 4 Côte de Bradfield. It was 1 kilometre (0.62 mi) long at an average gradient of 7.4%. The one point in the King of the Mountains competition was claimed by Andriy Hrivko of Astana Pro Team.

== Description ==
Bradfield is one of the largest parishes in England, and covers extensive moor and agricultural land around the Damflask Reservoir, Dale Dike Reservoir (the source of the Great Sheffield Flood of 1864), Strines Reservoir, and Agden Reservoirs, including the Bradfield, Midhope, and Broomhead moors and eastern parts of the Howden moors. The western end of the parish reaches to the upper parts of the Upper Derwent Valley with part of its boundary forming Yorkshire's border with Derbyshire. The northern part of the parish includes the Langsett Reservoir and Midhope Reservoir, and borders the town and civil parish of Stocksbridge.

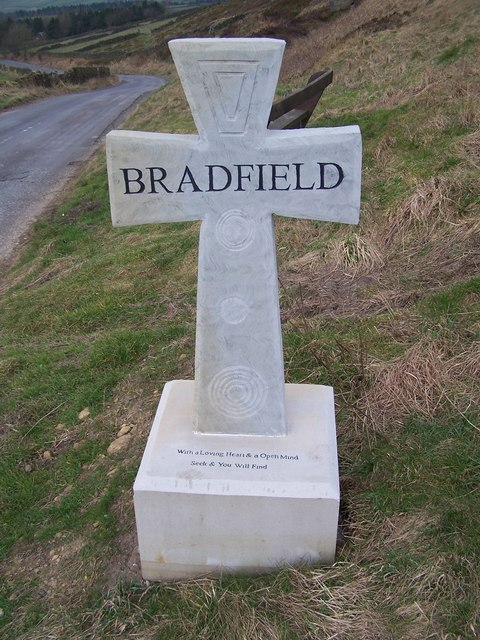
Cross in Bradfield, sculpted by Stoneface

The eastern edge reaches the western extent of the urban spread of Sheffield, and includes the suburb of Stannington, as well as the villages of Oughtibridge, Wharncliffe Side, and Worrall. Minor habitations within the parish include Midhopestones, Upper Midhope and Bolsterstone on the northern edge, and Dungworth in the southeastern part. The moorland villages of High Bradfield and Low Bradfield are located within the parish. High Bradfield possesses a Gothic Revival church, and the earthworks of a motte and bailey castle. Low Bradfield is less historic, having been largely destroyed in the Great Sheffield flood of 1864.

At the time of the 2001 census the parish had a population of 14,915, increasing to 17,100 at the 2011 Census. The parish extends across the City of Sheffield electoral wards of Stocksbridge and Upper Don and Stannington Ward, and covers more than a third of the land area of Sheffield City Council.

== Parish council ==
The parish council's office is in Mill Lee Road, Low Bradfield.
