= Little mester =

A little mester is a self-employed worker who rents space in a factory or works from their own workshop. They were involved in making cutlery or other smallish items such as edge tools (i.e. woodworking chisels). The term is used almost exclusively to describe the craftsmen of the Sheffield area, and is mostly archaic as this manner of manufacture peaked in the 19th century and has now virtually died out. Little mesters either worked alone or employed a small number of workers and/or apprentices.

Stan Shaw, referred to as one of the last little mesters, died in 2021.

== History ==
The origins of the term are uncertain. Mester is the Sheffield dialect variant of master, Thus a little mester refers to a master craftsman working on a small scale. Prior to the 18th century cutlery manufacture in Sheffield had been undertaken by individual master craftsmen who would make an item from start to finish. In the late 18th century there was a large increase in the size complexity of the cutlery and tool industries that made it necessary for craftsmen to focus on a single stage of the manufacture. Cutlery factories then rented workshops to self-employed craftsmen, the little mesters, each specializing in one step of production, such as forging, grinding or finishing.

== See also ==
- Journeyman
