= Storrs, South Yorkshire =

Hamlet in South Yorkshire, England

Coordinates: 53.400°N 1.566°W

Storrs
- Location within South Yorkshire
- Civil parish: Bradfield
- Metropolitan borough: Sheffield
- Metropolitan county: South Yorkshire
- Region: Yorkshire and the Humber
- Country: England
- Sovereign state: United Kingdom
- Post town: SHEFFIELD
- Postcode district: S6
- Dialling code: 0114
- Police: South Yorkshire
- Fire: South Yorkshire
- Ambulance: Yorkshire
- UK Parliament: Sheffield Hallam

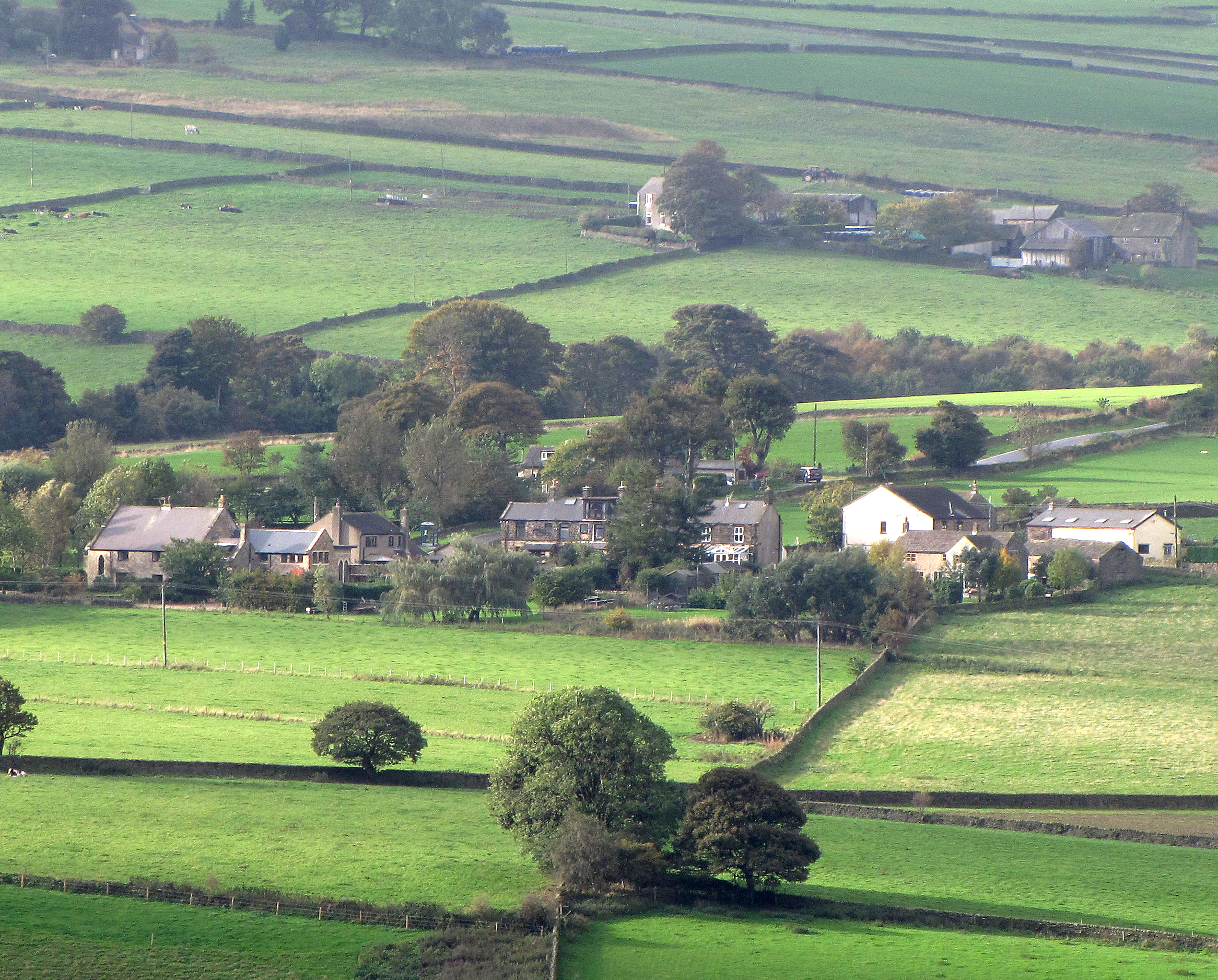
Village centre seen from Wadsley Common, 1.2 miles (2 km) to the north-east.

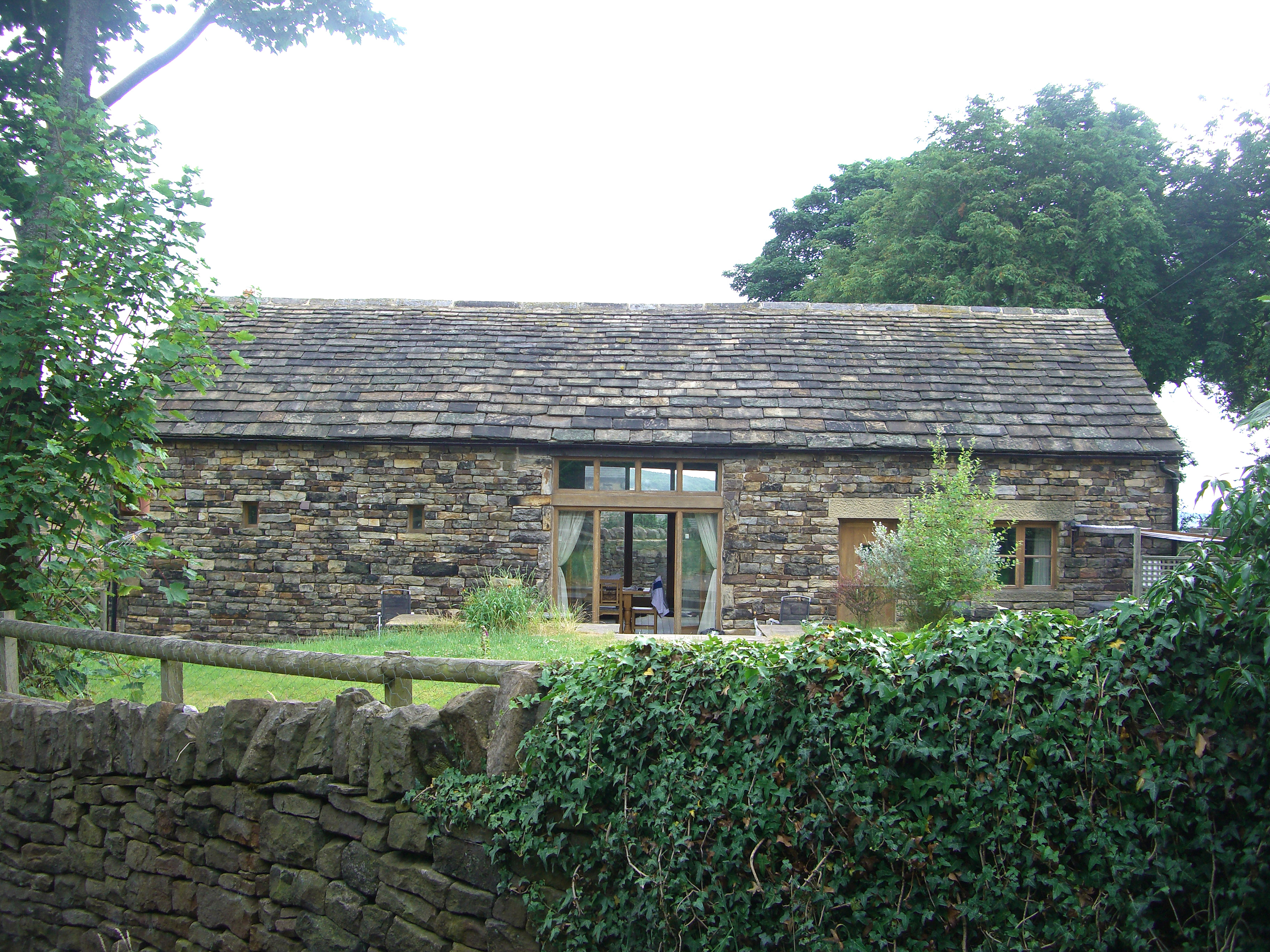
Throstle Nest Cruck Barn

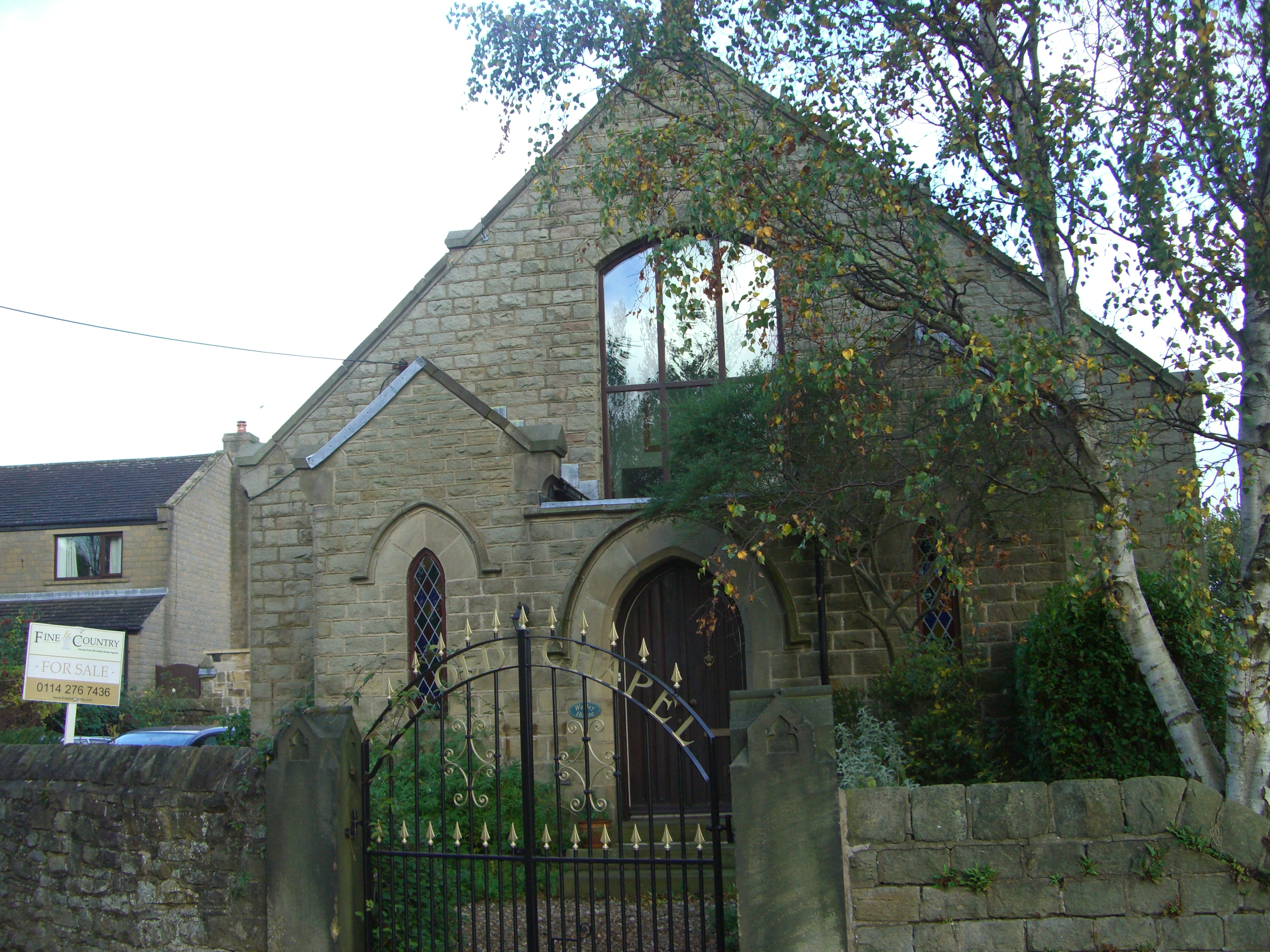
The former chapel is now a private residence

Storrs is a hamlet within the boundaries of the City of Sheffield in England, 4 miles (6.4 km) west-northwest of the city centre. It is between the suburb of Stannington and the village of Dungworth in the civil parish of Bradfield at a height of 210 metres above sea level between the Loxley and Rivelin valleys. Although historically a farming settlement, water-powered milling on the Storrs Brook and small-scale cutlery making has also taken place in the hamlet.

== History ==
The name Storrs is a derivation of the Old Norse word Storth, which means a wooded place and is commonly found in the names of Viking settlements set up in woodland clearings. One of the first written references to the hamlet was in 1288 when the ancient Hallamshire family of Shaw first became established after Ralph del Shagh became a tenant at a local farm; the surname continued at the same farm for the next four centuries. There was another reference in 1323 when William, the son of Anne Dungworth, was admitted to a small farm at Storrs.

The moors and common land around Storrs were enclosed between 1791 and 1805. The proposal, which was put forward by Charles Howard, 11th Duke of Norfolk and other landowners in 1787, met with some hostility by "several of the freeholders and inhabitants" as the usage of the land became controlled by the owner. However, none of the challengers to the policy owned enough land to defy the large landowners. In 1881 it was recorded that nine men from Storrs were working at the pot clay drift mine at Load Brook, 2 km to the west.

=== Mills on the Storrs Brook ===
The Storrs Brook flows just south of the hamlet and joins the River Loxley at Rowell Bridge. The brook has been used to power two mills over the years. Storrs Mill dates from 1749 when it was a snuff mill; by 1783 it had been converted into a paper mill and it served as such until the middle of the 19th century. After being used as a corn mill for a time, it was unoccupied and disused by 1931. Storrs Mill has now been renovated and is a private residence; the two mill dams are still visible within the grounds. Loxley Wire Mill was further downstream, near the brook's confluence with the River Loxley. It dates from 1693 and was used as a cutlers wheel, smelt mill, wire mill and corn mill over the years. It was damaged in the Great Sheffield Flood of 1864, and today there are no visible signs.

== Buildings and amenities ==
Many of the present-day buildings in Storrs have had a change in usage over the years. The cruck barn at Throstle Nest Farm is a grade II listed building from the 17th century; it has four pairs of crucks within it. The barn has been converted into residential use in recent years and has been available to rent as a holiday cottage. The old Sunday school building was built in 1821 and closed in 1884 when a new chapel was built in the hamlet; it is now in residential use.

Storrs Chapel, built in 1884 and closed in 1975, is also now a private residence known as Wesley House. The village shop also underwent the same fate when it closed in the 1960s. Chapel cottages and Storrs Green cottages are both long-standing groups of housing. Chapel Cottages were built in the latter part of the 1700s; a cutler's shop operated at the rear at one stage. Storrs House Farm has operated a boarding cattery for many years. Storrs Hall was the home for a time of Thomas Wragg, owner of the nearby fire brick factory. Other buildings in the hamlet include Storrs Green Farm, which is still a working farm; Storrs Grange Farm; and Hazelhurst Farm.

Storrs Park is a small recreation area for the community, at the junction of Storrs Lane and Lee Moor Lane. The park consists of a few children's swings and an area of grass on land leased and maintained by Bradfield Parish Council. There is no public transport for the hamlet, although the 762 school bus service passes through to take pupils to Bradfield School at Worrall.
