= Little Matlock Rolling Mill =

Rolling mill

Coordinates: 53.4008°N 1.536°W

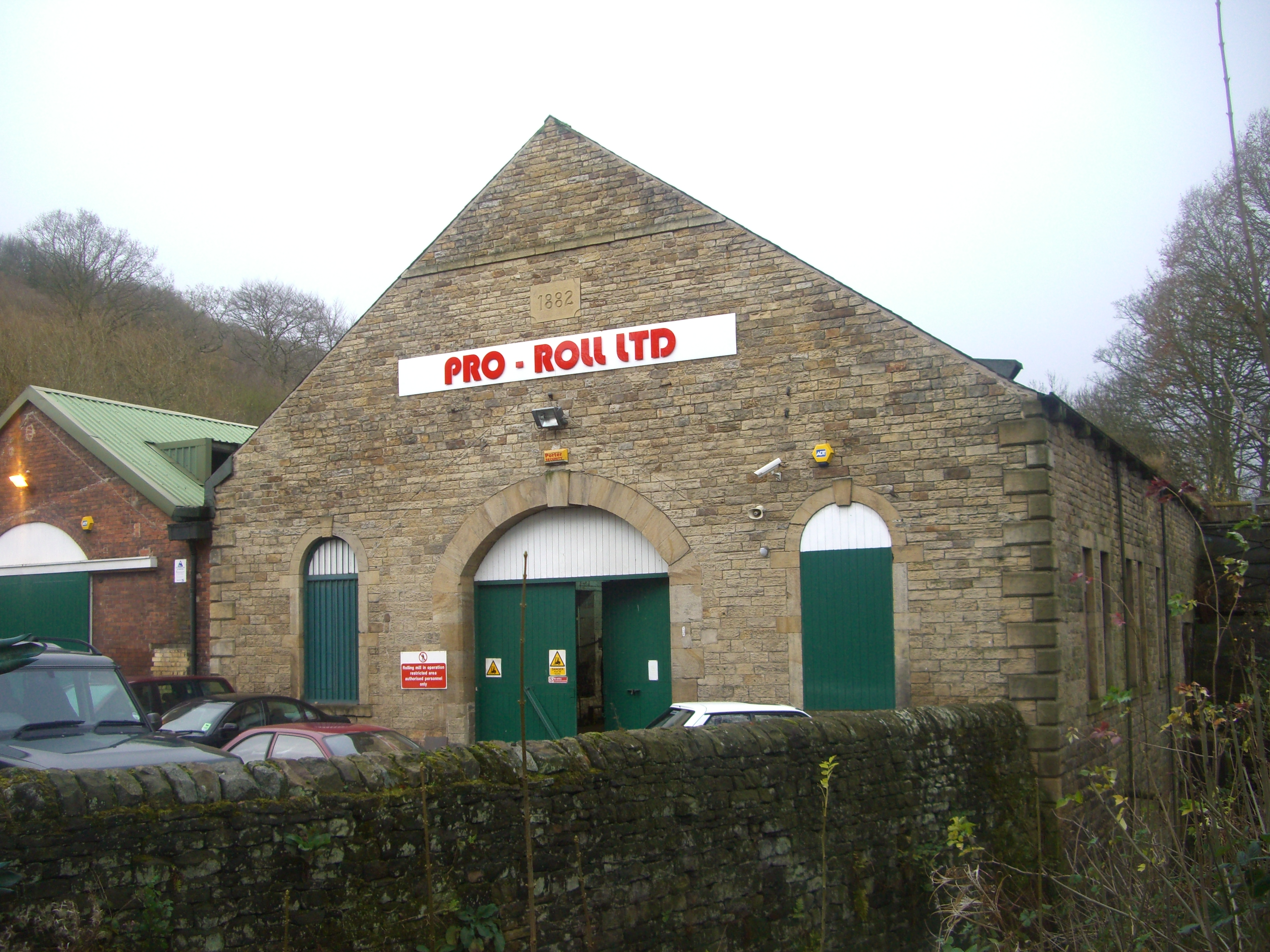
The present day rolling mill, there is a date stone "1882" high on the building. The brick buildings to the left are a later addition.

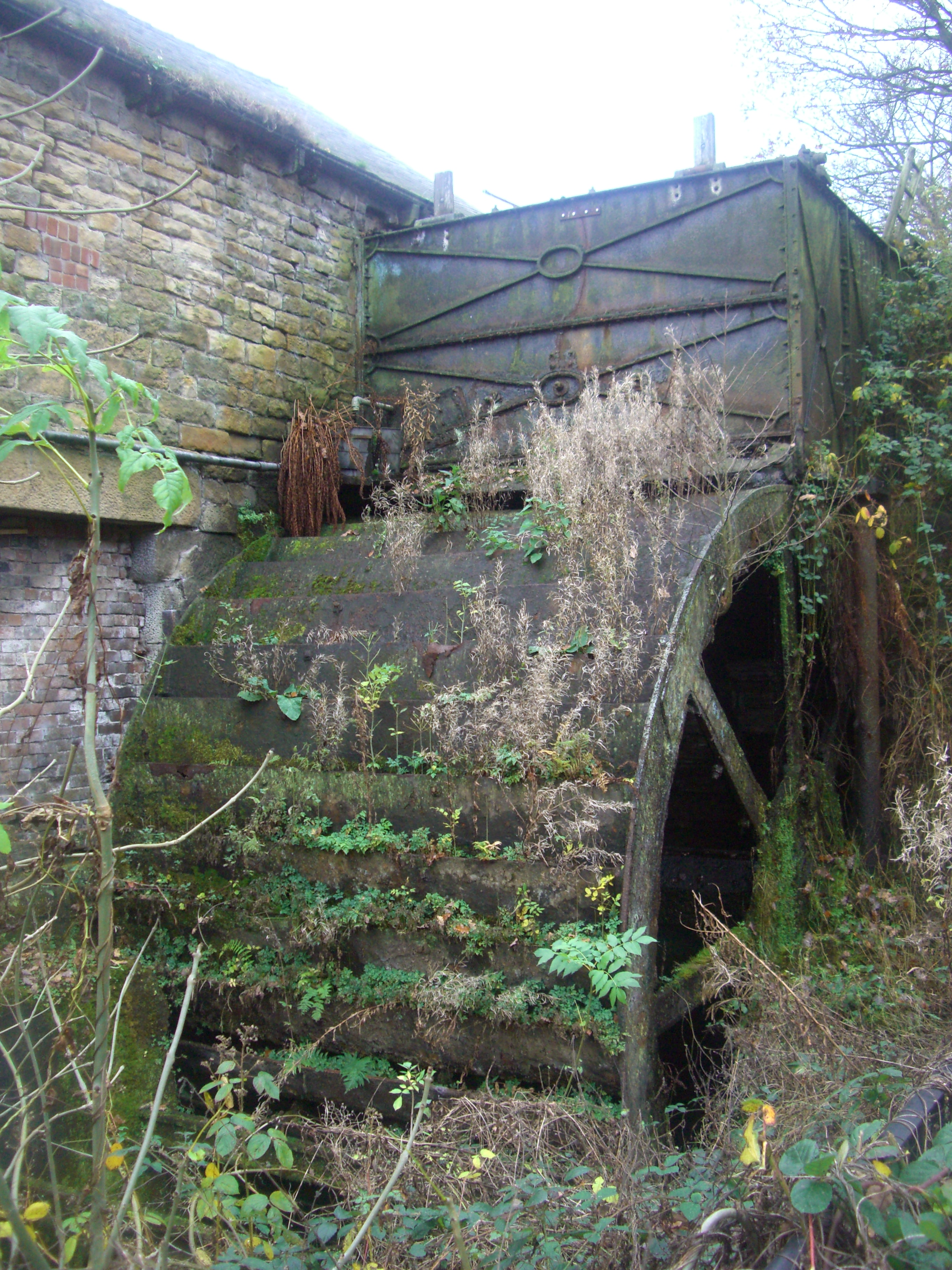
The water wheel is in an overgrown state.

Little Matlock Rolling Mill also known as Low Matlock Rolling Mill is a Grade II* Listed building situated on the River Loxley in the village of Loxley on the outskirts of the City of Sheffield, South Yorkshire, England. The building continues to operate as a rolling mill, owned and operated by Pro-Roll Ltd, a specialist hand rolling company. A brick building extension was added to the original 1882 structure in 1939.

== History ==
The original mill dated from 1732 when James Balguy of Stannington leased land from the Duke of Norfolk to build a cutlers wheel on the site. Balguy operated the wheel until 1743 when Tobias Andrews took over. The rental records show numerous names as tenants in the ensuing years with the more long standing being the Hawley family, James Colley, J.W. Armitage and J. Shaw. Arnold Wilde was the occupant in 1801 and by 1806 he had purchased the mill outright. In the early part of the 19th century the mill consisted of three workshops with two overshot water wheels which drove two pairs of tilt hammers, two forge hammers and a plating hammer.

=== Great Sheffield Flood ===
The hamlet of Little Matlock was severely damaged by the Great Sheffield Flood of March 1864, it was accentuated by the fact that the River Loxley is quite narrow at that point as it squeezes between steep valley sides. There was no damage to dwellings as they were situated on higher ground away from the flood but the industrial wheels and tilts by the river were either completely destroyed or severely damaged. Two young men were killed at Mr. Thomas Harrison’s Tilt and Forge. Mr Cadman the owner of Little Matlock Forge claimed over £5,000 in compensation after the flood for damage to tilts, forges, dam banking, weir and cottages.

The present day structure was built in 1882 on the foundations of the old buildings being constructed from squared gritstone with a slate roof. The building re-opened as a rolling mill being driven by a single overshot water wheel. The mill remained water driven until 1956 when it was converted to electricity under the ownership of Kenyon Brothers and Co, Ltd.

In 1974 the mill was sold to Barworth Flockton Ltd and then in 1997 it was taken over by Firth Rixson Ltd, who worked the rolling mill for two years. When operations ceased in 1999, the whole site was sold to a development company who had intended to convert all the buildings to residential properties. The mill's houses, the mill dam, water courses and water wheel were sold off as separate lots, however intervention from Sheffield City Council prevented the main mill buildings from being turned into housing, instead requiring that they retain their original purpose as a rolling mill. Pro-Roll Ltd bought the mill buildings and yard in 2001, re-opening the Little Matlock site as a traditional hand-rolling mill later that year.

== Water wheel ==
The overshot water wheel is immobile and has not been used since 1956, it is now off its bearings and covered in vegetation and in need of renovation, it is the largest wheel of its type to survive in Sheffield. It has a diameter of 18ft 6in and a width of 11ft 8in with 8 cast-iron spokes to each side and 42 buckets. Above the wheel is a cast iron penstock now permanently closed. In the 1950s it was estimated that the wheel could generate 25 horse power using Volumetric flow rate data. Behind the wheel are a dam and mill race constructed to drive the wheel.
