= Bradfield Dale =

Valley in England

Coordinates: 53.4164382°N 1.6399508°W

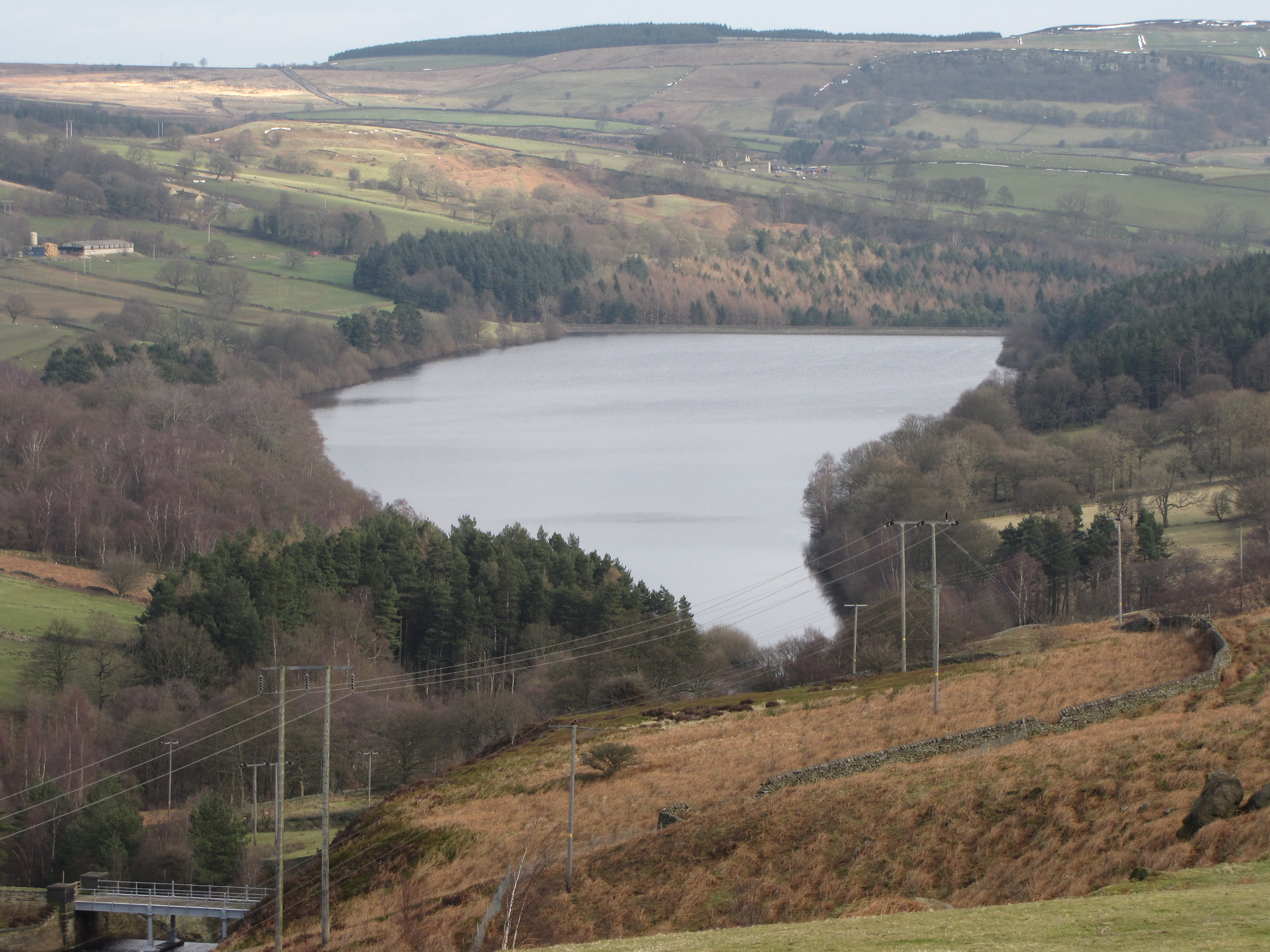
View down the dale from Boots Folly, Dale Dike reservoir in view

Bradfield Dale is a rural valley 12 kilometres (7.5 mi) west-northwest of the City of Sheffield in England. The valley stands within the north-eastern boundary of the Peak District National Park just west of the village of Low Bradfield. The dale is drained by the Strines Dike which becomes the Dale Dike lower down the valley, these being the headwaters of the River Loxley. The dale contains two reservoirs, Strines and Dale Dike, and a third, Agden Reservoir, stands in a side valley just above Low Bradfield. The dale is characterised by agricultural land interspersed with farming and residential buildings. It is approximately 5 kilometres (3.1 mi) long from its foot at Low Bradfield to its head on Strines Moor.

== Roads ==
Two roads travel up the valley from its lower regions: Dale Road passes on the north side of the dale with Blindside Lane on the south. Mortimer Road traverses around the valley at a height of around 310 metres (1,020 ft). This road was named after Hans Winthrop Mortimer, the Lord of Bamford and a former Member of Parliament, who obtained an Act of Parliament in 1771 to improve the bridleway between Penistone and Bamford by repairing, widening and building bridges to make it fit for wheeled traffic.

== Great Sheffield Flood ==
The lower part of Bradfield Dale was the first area to be inundated by the Great Sheffield Flood of 1864. The dale beneath the stricken Dale Dike reservoir is rural with very few habitations. However, the farmstead of John Empsall and his family which stood by the Annet bridge was completely swept away by the torrent. Luckily the Empsalls, including their three children, survived, as did their lodger William Rose, a reservoir construction worker. They had been forewarned of the imminent disaster ten minutes earlier by local resident Thomas Fish. The Annet bridge was destroyed in the deluge, to be rebuilt at a later date.

== Significant buildings ==
Hallfield House and Sugworth Hall are the best two examples of residential houses within Bradfield Dale, both being given listed status by English Heritage. Hallfield dates from at least the 14th century, while Sugworth was mentioned in documents in the 16th century although it was then completely different in character to its present form. Just to the north of Sugworth Hall stands Boot's Folly (also known as Sugworth Tower), a conspicuous landmark on a hillside above Strines Reservoir.

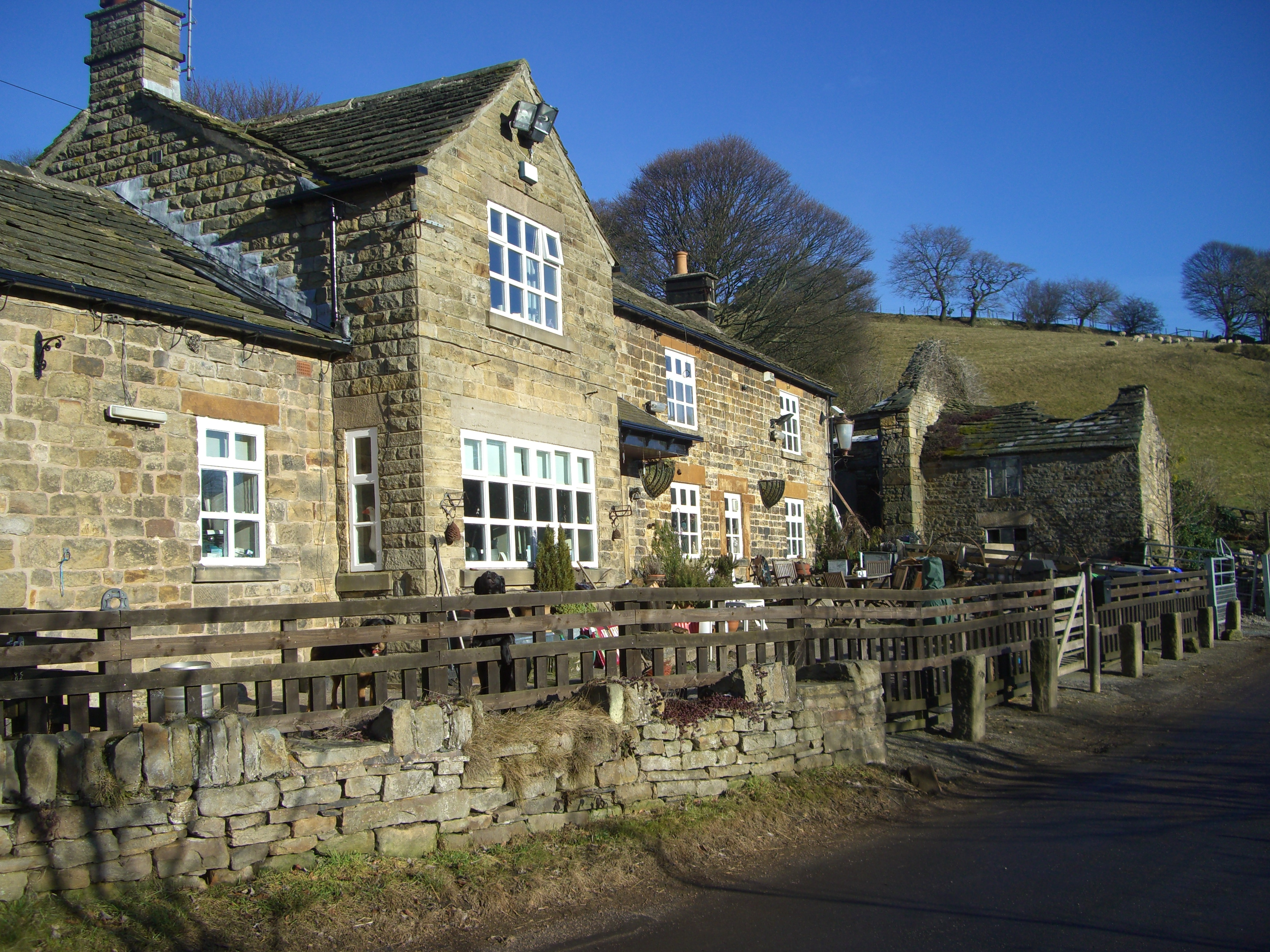
Haychatter House

=== Thornseats Lodge ===
Thornseats Lodge is an imposing house, which stands high (320 metres/1,050 ft) on the north side of the valley off Mortimer Road above Dale Dike Reservoir dam wall. It was built in 1855 for the steel maker Sidney Jessop as a base for grouse shooting on the surrounding moorland. His better known brother Thomas Jessop (1804–1887) inherited the lodge and made significant improvements. The lodge eventually passed to Thomas' son William (1856–1905). Sheffield City Council purchased the building for use as an orphanage and then a children's home in the 1930s. In the 1980s it was sold to local businessman Doug Hague, and it now stands in a derelict state.

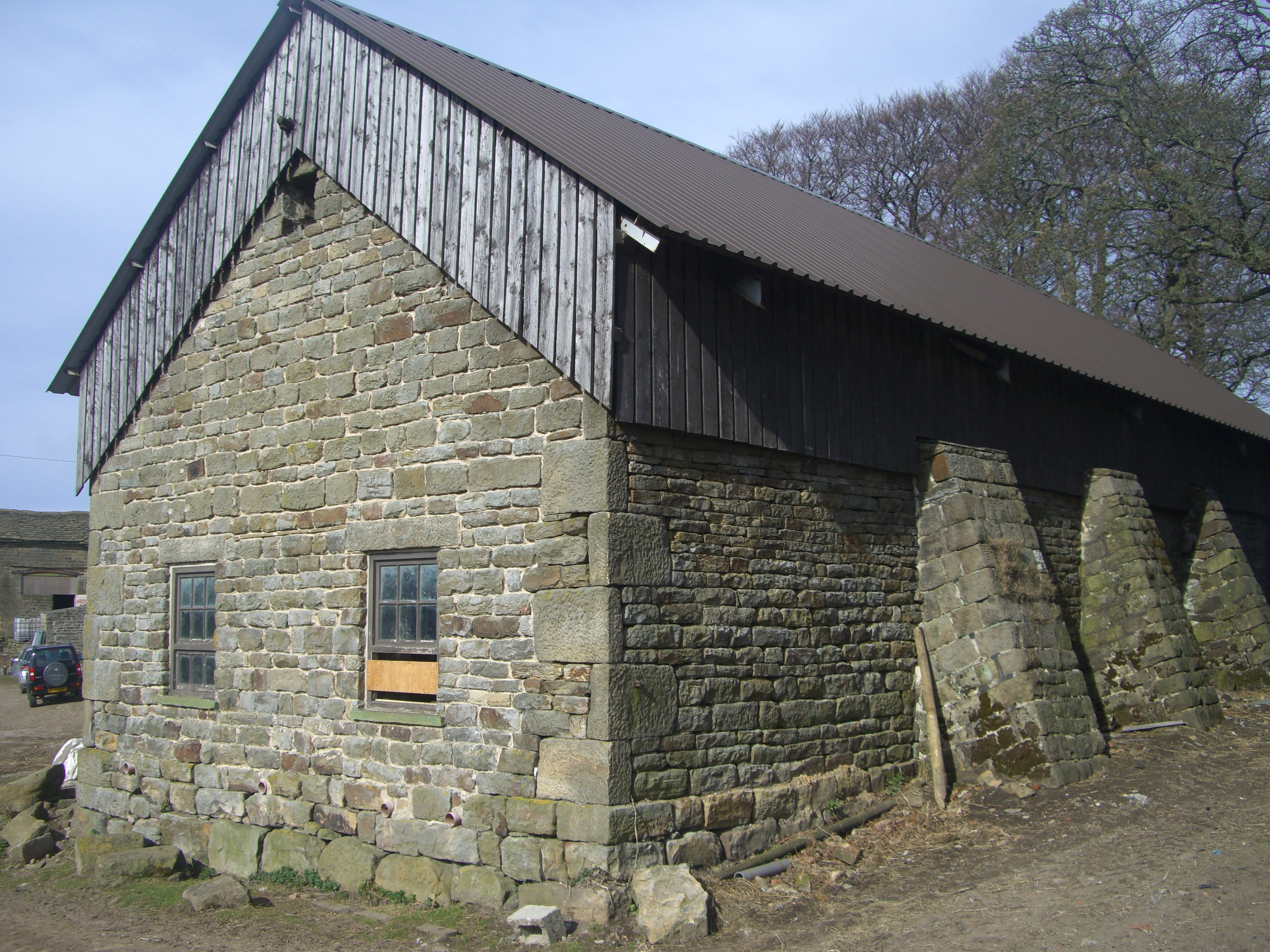
Cruck barn at Woodseats farm

=== Farm buildings ===
Many of the farm buildings in the valley are of some age. Lower Thornseat farmhouse on Dale Road (grade II listed) dates from 1721 and stands within a small group of buildings which includes the Dale Dike reservoir keeper's house, a substantial stone built house dating from the 1870s. Further down Dale Road is Walker House Farm, which includes an early 17th-century cruck barn. Woodseats Farm on the dale's northern slopes also has a surviving cruck barn. Almost adjacent to Walker House on Dale Road is Haychatter House, which dates from the late 1500s and was a farm building for several hundred years. When the reservoirs were built in the dale during the 1860s the farm became a public house serving the large number of navvies who arrived to do the construction work. Initially called the Reservoir Inn and then the Haychatter Inn, the pub closed in 2003, being run by the Siddall family for last 30 years of operation. Today it is a private house. Edgefield House, now marked on maps as Edgefield Farm, is one of the largest houses in the dale; built in a sunless north-facing position off Hoar Stones Road, it was the home of the eminent Sheffield solicitor William Tattershall (1774–1834). By the roadside is a small unusual listed building, erected to protect people from a spring in which a child drowned in 1832.

=== Strines Inn ===
The Strines Inn, the only public house left in the dale with the closing of the Haychatter, stands at the head of the valley on Mortimer Road at a height of 1000 feet above sea level. Although there are claims that there was a structure on the site in the 13th century, it seems that the building dates from the 16th century, with the upper wing added in the 18th century and the part adjacent to the road constructed in 1860. The Worralls were a local gentry family who lived at Strines, and their coat of arms is carved above the doorway. The inn was converted to a public house in the 1770s.
