= Strines Reservoir =

Reservoir in South Yorkshire, England

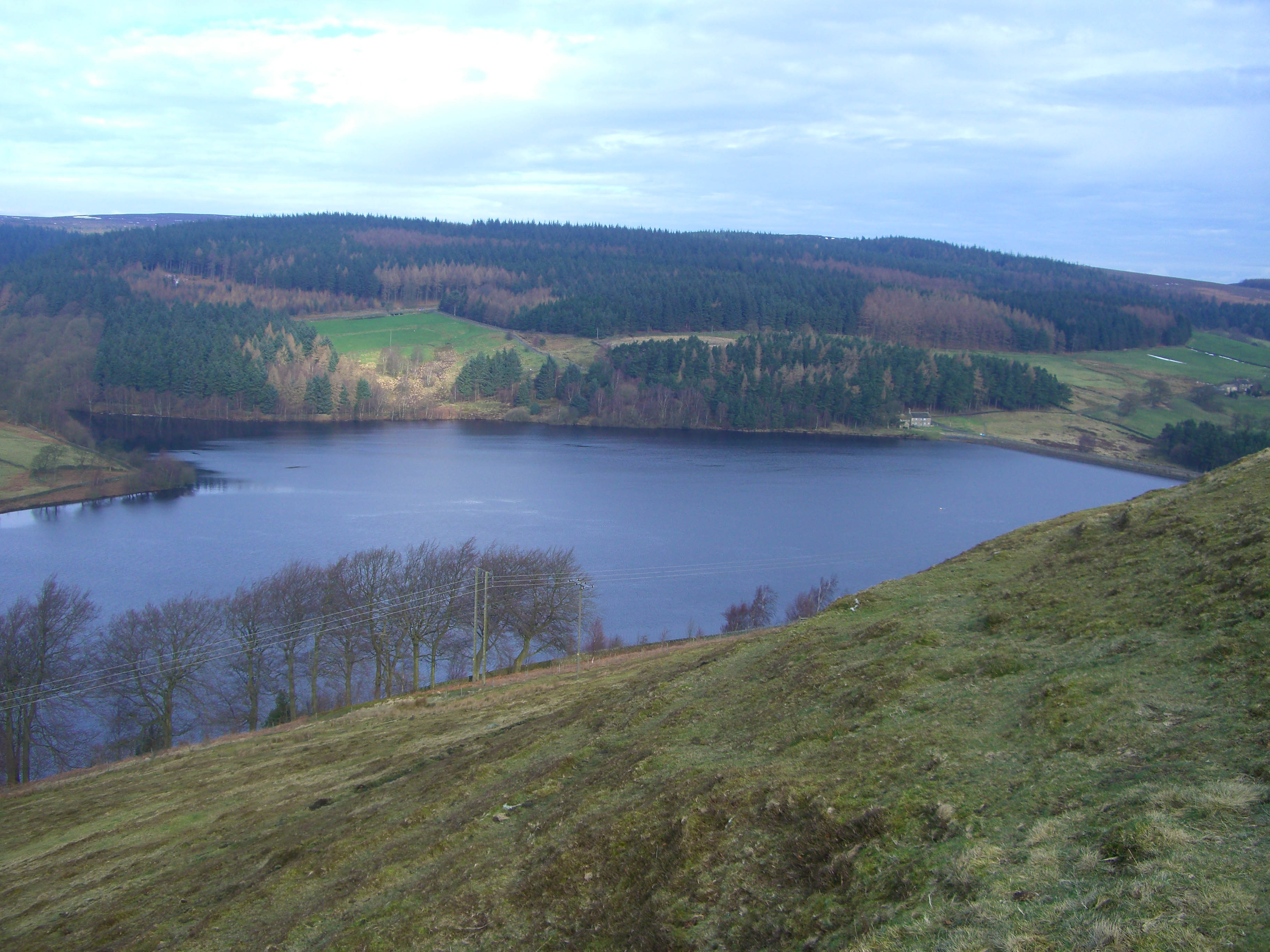
- Seen from the high ground to the south at Boots Folly

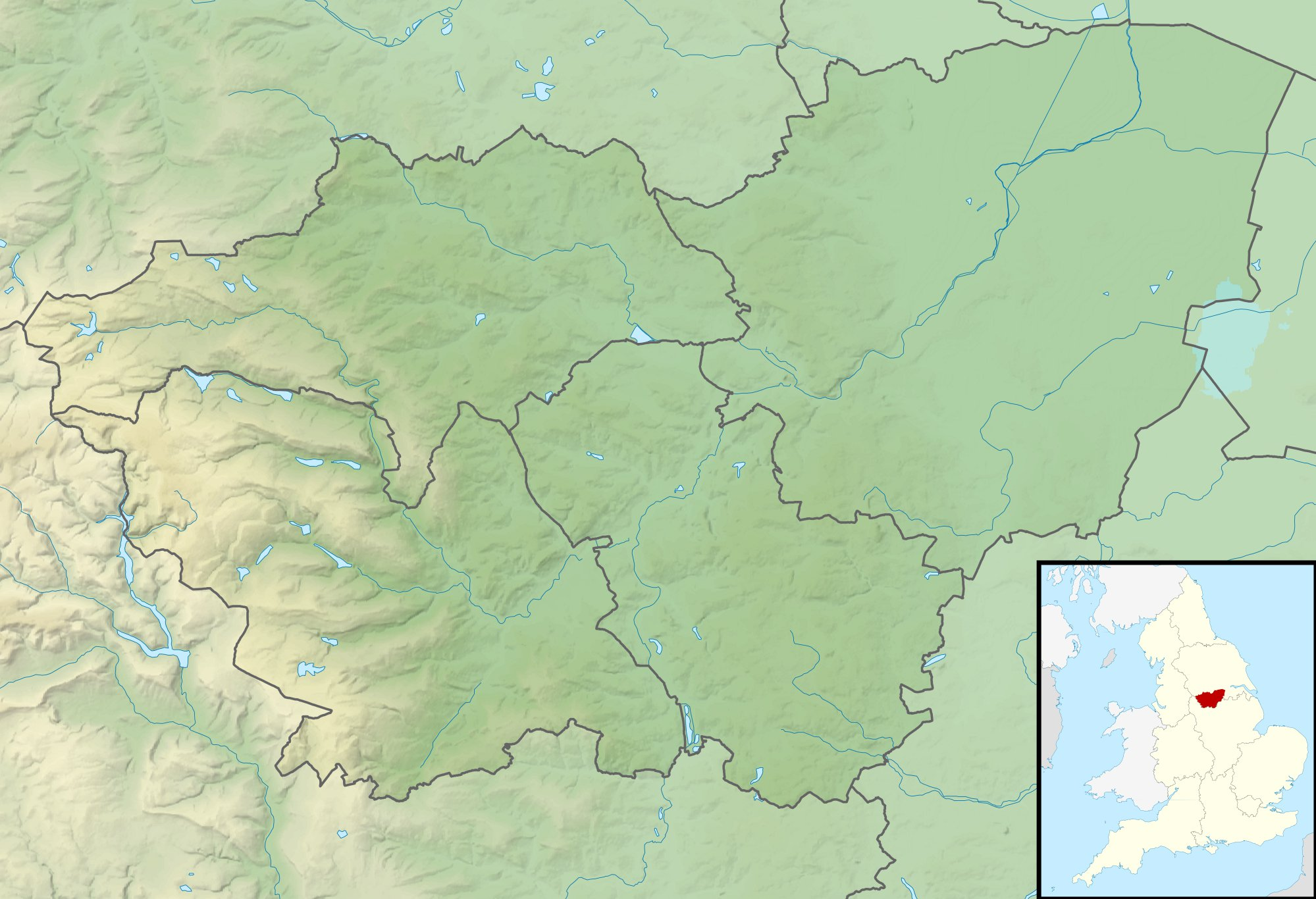
- Location within South Yorkshire
- Location: Bradfield Dale, South Yorkshire
- Coordinates: 53.4099°N 1.6557°W
- Type: reservoir
- Basin countries: United Kingdom
- Surface area: 22 ha (54 acres)
- Water volume: 452.9×10^{6} imp gal (2.059×10^{6} m^{3}; 1,669 acre⋅ft)

Strines Reservoir is a water storage reservoir situated at 53.4099°N 1.6557°W, 8 miles (13 km) west of the centre of Sheffield in South Yorkshire, England.

== Construction ==
The reservoir was constructed in 1869 after the Sheffield Waterworks Company made the decision in the late 1850s to build four reservoirs in Bradfield Dale to impound water from the surrounding moorland to provide for the growing town of Sheffield. Sheffield had previously received its water supply from the Crookesmoor dams close to the town centre but by the mid-19th century these were becoming inadequate.

In addition to Strines, three other reservoirs were built: Damflask, Agden and Dale Dike. Strines was meant to be the final of the four reservoirs constructed; however, Dale Dike was not completed until 1875, having to be rebuilt after the failure of its dam wall caused the Great Sheffield Flood of 1864. Strines Reservoir was constructed with a dam wall of approximately 330 metres (1083 feet) in length and 29 metres (95 feet) in height which flooded an area of 22 hectares. It holds 452,900,000 gallons of water.

== Etymology ==
The name Strines dates from as early as the 13th century, when it was mentioned in the Sheffield Court records as the Water of the Strynd or Strynds, referring to the stream that rose on the moors at the top end of Bradfield Dale and flowed down the valley to join the River Loxley at Low Bradfield. The Oxford English Dictionary defines the word strynds or strinds as a rivulet or a stream.

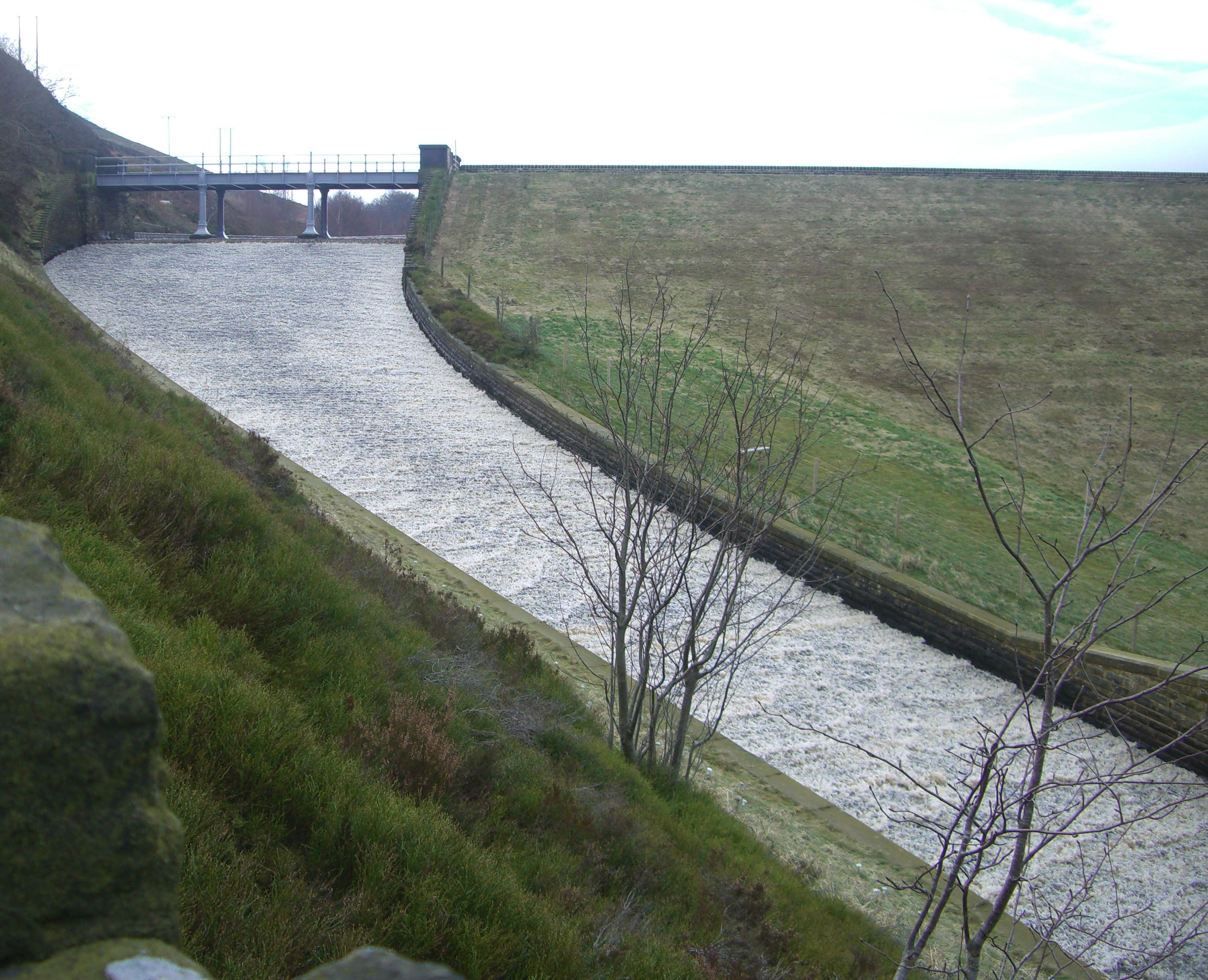
The overflow spillway in spate

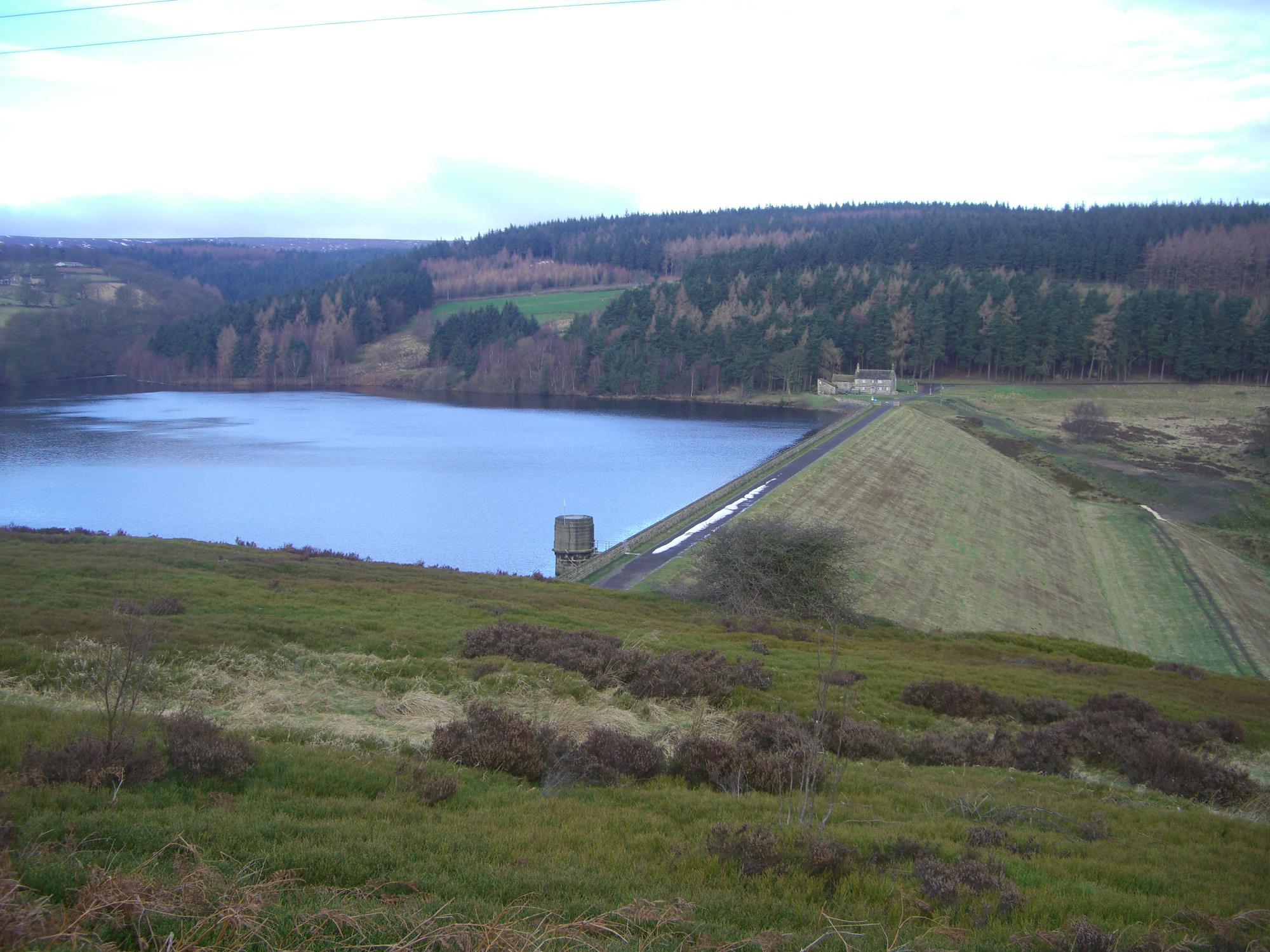
The dam wall with the valve house at the near end and Brogging House at the far

== The reservoir and its environment ==
The reservoir's main source of water comes off the Derwent Moors, 2 km to the west with the Strines Dike and Foulstone Dike rising at a height of around 500 metres above sea level and converging before flowing down to the reservoir which stands at a height of 250 metres. There are several smaller tributaries to the reservoir that flow off Ughill Moors to the south. There is only one habitation in the immediate vicinity of the reservoir, Brogging House, a dwelling which pre-dates the reservoir by some time, being recorded as being leased by George Woodhead in 1715 and probably significantly older than that. The house stands at the north end of the dam wall and at one time served as the reservoir-keeper's house when one was needed.

Today the reservoir is attended by Yorkshire Water staff who can gain vehicular access to the valve house through a locked gate and gravel track that runs along the top of the dam wall. The reservoir's overflow is located at the south end of the dam wall and takes the form of a 25-foot-wide (7.6 m) concrete spillway which is crossed by a steel footbridge. The overflow water goes down Bradfield Dale to the Dale Dike Reservoir which is just 400 metres downstream. Water drawn off for consumer use is piped 7 km to the water treatment works in the Loxley Valley.

At the southern arm of the reservoir is Pear House Clough, down which flows one of the small southern tributaries. The clough is surrounded by Pear House Wood, an ancient broad-leaved wood with an area of 16 hectares. The wood is part of the New Native Wood Challenge Scheme funded by the Forestry Commission Challenge Fund which aims to manage, enhance and extend native woodland. The wood has been fenced off to exclude livestock to allow new planting and natural regeneration of trees. New species planted are Sessile Oak, Hazel and Holly while much of the regeneration is Birch, Alder and Rowan. The northern arm of the reservoir formed by Strines Dike is surrounded by a coniferous plantation.

== Access ==
Access to the reservoir for walkers is quite good, with a bridleway approaching from the minor public road to the north known as Mortimer Road. From the south walkers may gain access by using part of the Sheffield Country Walk which approaches from Sugworth Road. It is also possible to walk up Bradfield Dale from Low Bradfield using various footpaths which also pass by Dale Dike Reservoir.

== Boot's Folly ==
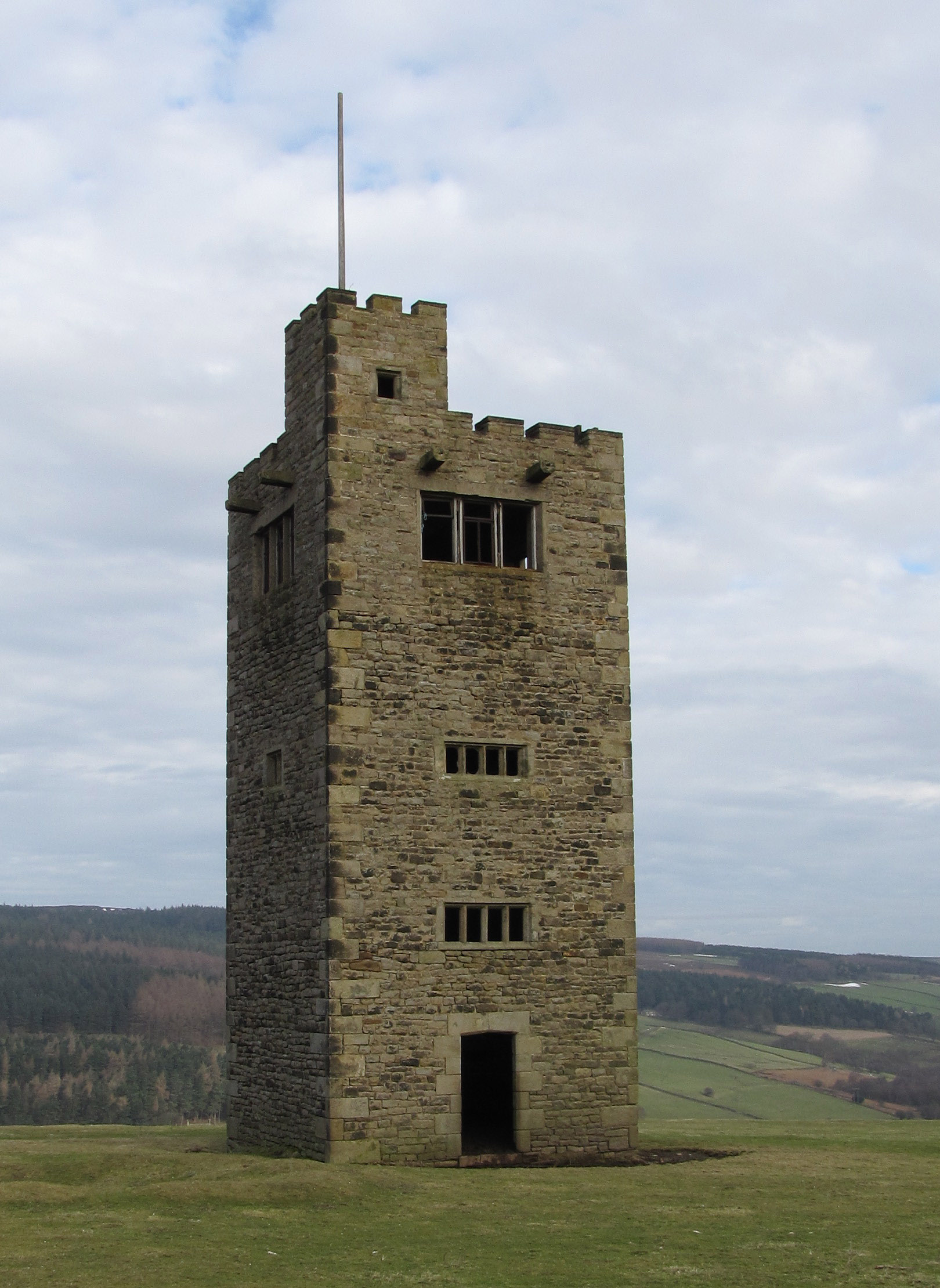
Boot's Folly.

At 53.4055°N 1.6549°W, high on the south flanks of the reservoir at a height of 315 metres (1,033 ft), stands Boot's Folly, also known occasionally as Strines Tower or Sugworth Tower. This folly was constructed in 1927 by Charles Boot who resided at nearby Sugworth Hall. The 45-foot-high (14 m) square tower with castellated top and flagpole was built from leftover stone when the nearby Bents House was constructed. The stone for Bents House had come from the disused Bents Farm, Pears House Farm and Nether Holes Farm, which had been demolished because they were suspected of polluting the waters in the dale. It is thought that Boot's Folly was constructed to provide work for Sugworth Hall's workmen during The Depression. There is also a theory, however, that Boot built the tower so he could see High Bradfield churchyard where his wife, who had died in 1926, aged 56, was buried. Today the interior is bare but it originally had wood panelling and a large furnished room at the top where the Boot family could enjoy the view. There was a spiral staircase to the top, but this was removed some years ago after a cow climbed the stairs and became stuck. The Folly is Grade II listed and gives fine views of the reservoir and Bradfield Dale.
