= Low Bradfield =

Village in South Yorkshire, England

Coordinates: 53.4229°N 1.6054°W

Low Bradfield shown within Sheffield

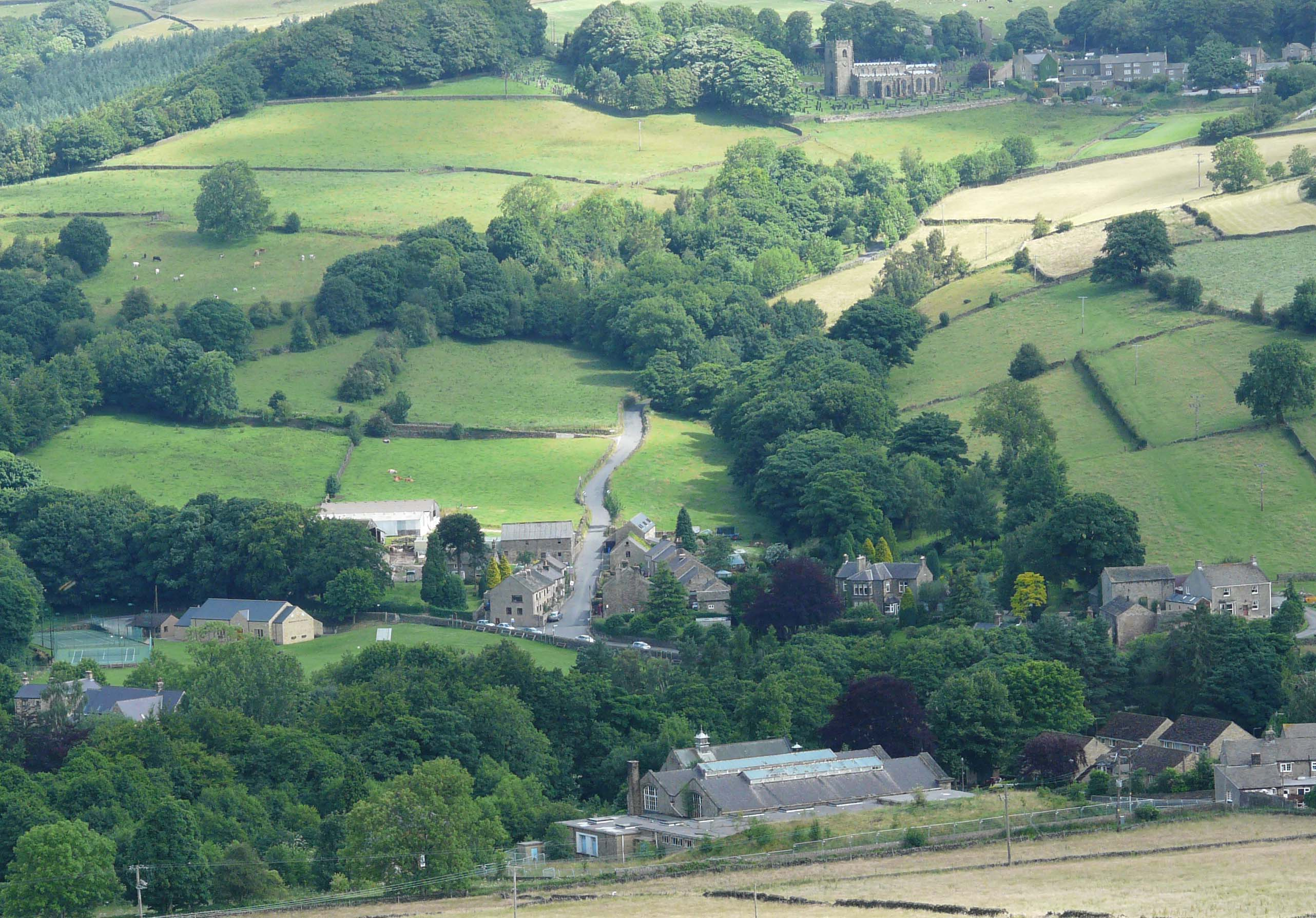
Low Bradfield seen from the high ground to the south. Woodfall Lane can be seen climbing to High Bradfield at the top of the picture

Low Bradfield is a village within the civil parish of Bradfield in South Yorkshire, England. It is situated within the boundary of the city of Sheffield in the upper part of the Loxley Valley, 6¼ miles west-northwest of the city centre and just inside the northeast boundary of the Peak District National Park. Low Bradfield and the surrounding area is noted for its attractive countryside which draws many visitors from the more urban parts of Sheffield. At weekends the village can become quite crowded, especially when there is a match on the village cricket pitch. Low Bradfield which stands in the shadow of Agden Reservoir has a sister village High Bradfield which is located at a higher altitude, ½ mile to the northeast. The two villages are joined by the steep Woodfall Lane.

== History ==
=== Early history ===
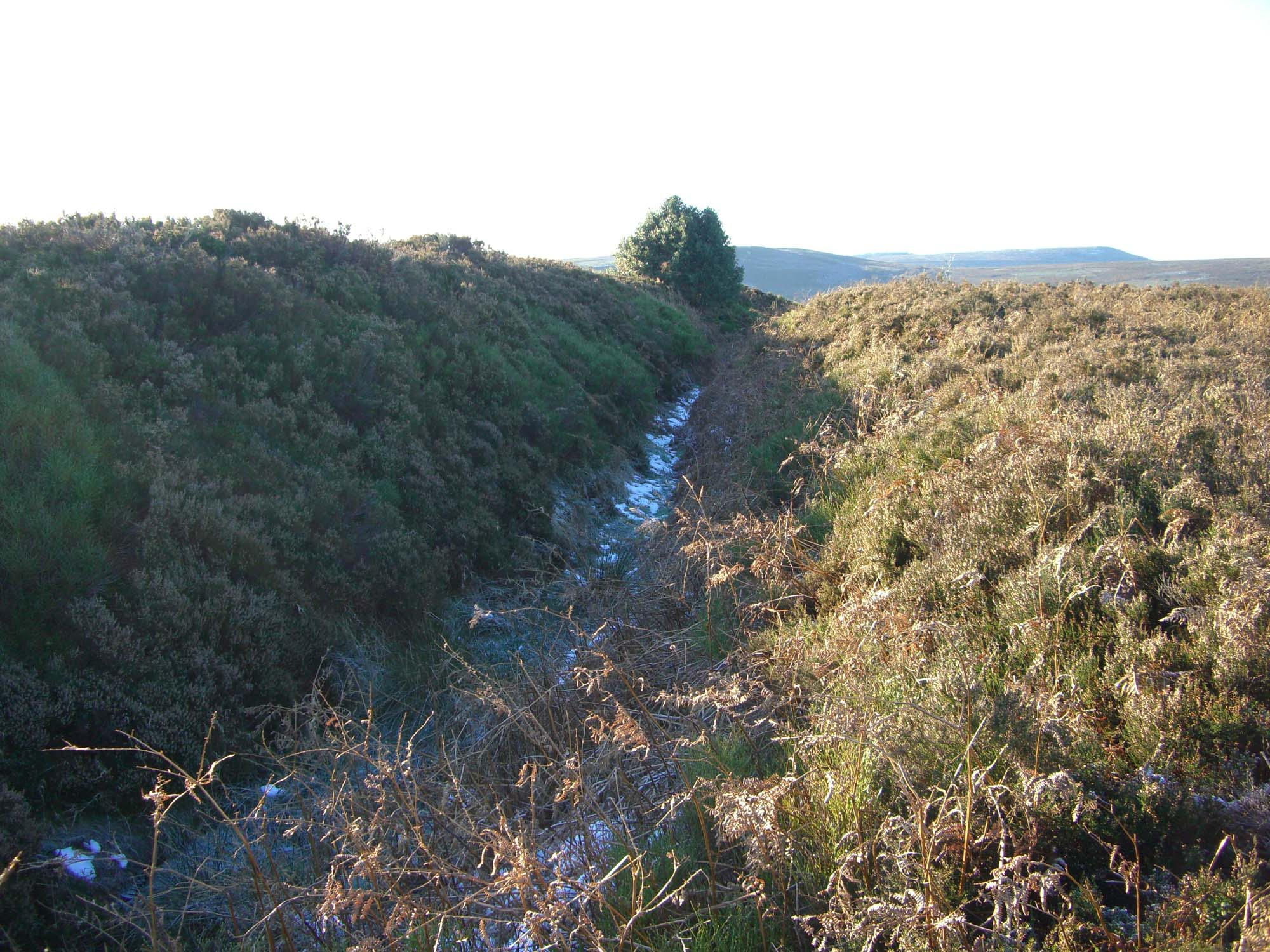
The Bar Dike, nearly 2 miles northwest of Low Bradfield is a Dark Ages tribal boundary.

The earliest historical sign of settlement in the Bradfield area is an early to mid Bronze Age ring cairn on Broomhead Moors, three miles to the northwest of Low Bradfield. This is believed to be a ritual or burial site from over 4,000 years ago. On the ridge between Bradfield Dale and the Ewden Valley is the Bar Dike, a 492 yards long trench with a rampart on its southern side which is 10 feet high in places. The dike is believed to have marked the boundary between different Dark Ages tribes in the period following the withdrawal of The Romans from Britain.

=== Anglo-Saxon cross ===
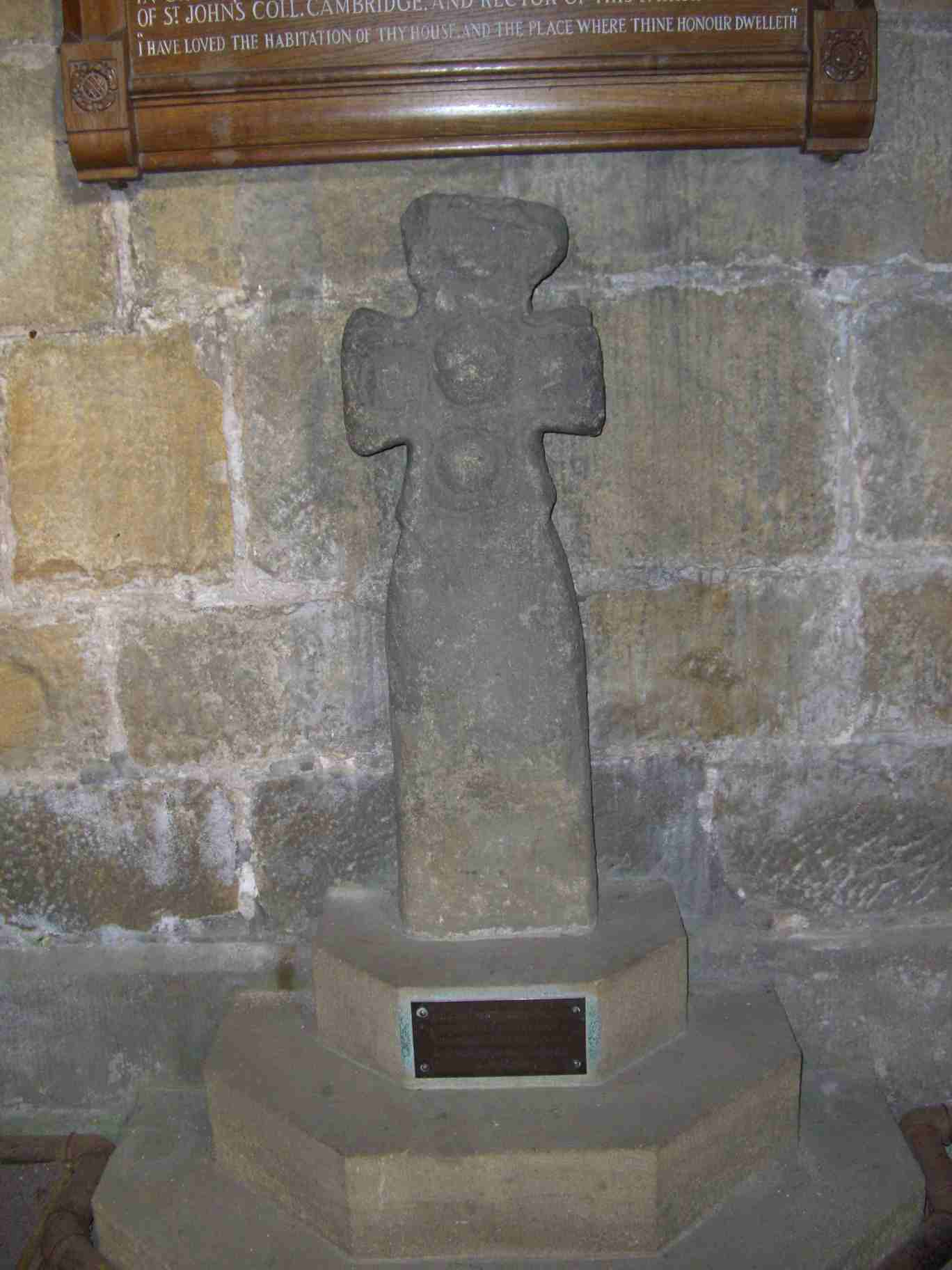
The 10th-century Saxon cross is now in the nave of St Nicholas church, High Bradfield

There is evidence of Anglo-Saxon settlement within the Low Bradfield area with the discovery in 1870 of an Anglo-Saxon cross in a field near the site of the former Cross Inn, not far from the village centre. It has been examined by Sheffield University's Phil Sidebottom who has compared it to similar crosses found in Staffordshire that were put up in the middle of the 10th century. He says the cross’s hammer head design confirms that it dates to just before the Norman Conquest. The cross can now be seen in the nave of St. Nicholas' Church at High Bradfield.

=== Norman development ===
While Bradfied is not documented in the Domesday Book of 1086, it is inconceivable that it was not settled at that time, and it is believed to be one of 16 unnamed Berewicks (an outlying part of a large manor) within Hallamshire that are mentioned. The hamlet of Low Bradfield grew up around the manorial corn mill which was established on the banks of the River Loxley in the shadow of the local church and castle at High Bradfield. The village developed as a farming community, with much of the surrounding countryside set aside by the Norman lords as a deer-hunting park. The Howard family showed little interest in hunting and the deer were finally removed from the park in the 16th century.

=== Great Sheffield Flood ===
Low Bradfield was the first populated place to be flooded by the Great Sheffield Flood when the Dale Dyke Dam broke on 11 March 1864. The original dam wall stood almost one mile west of the village. There was only one fatality in the village mainly because word had spread throughout the immediate area that there was a leak in the earth embankment and the community was partly prepared for the tragedy. The only death was a one-day-old infant, the child of a local couple (Mr. and Mrs. Dawson); despite this the village was extensively damaged. Two stone bridges were swept away, as was the corn mill, blacksmith’s shop, schoolroom, schoolmaster's house and a farmhouse. Samuel Harrison described the flood damage at Low Bradfield thus: “The destruction at Lower Bradfield is so thorough that the rock is torn up from under the foundation of the buildings.”

== Present day ==
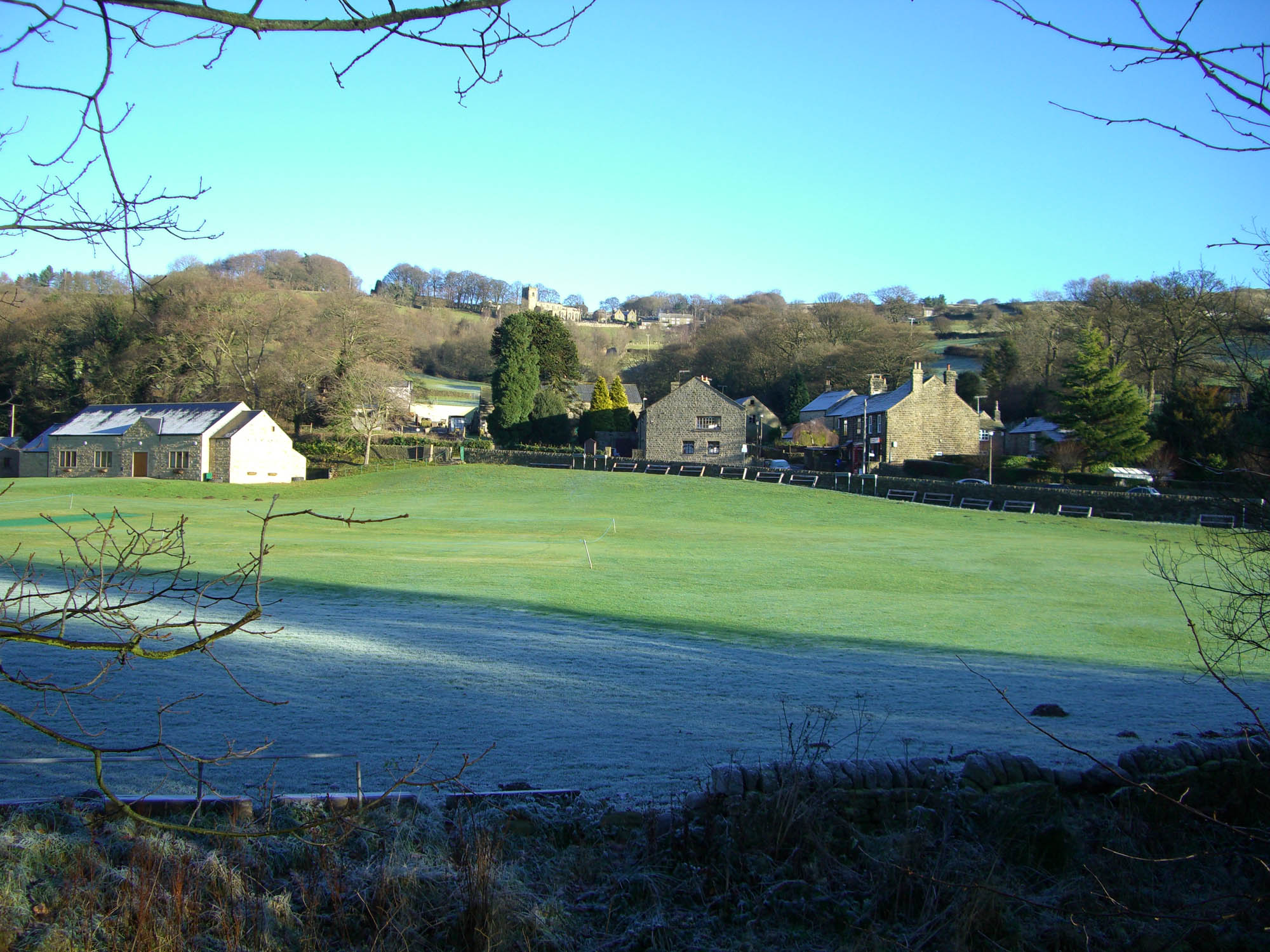
Looking across the Ibbotson Memorial Field, with the village hall to the left.

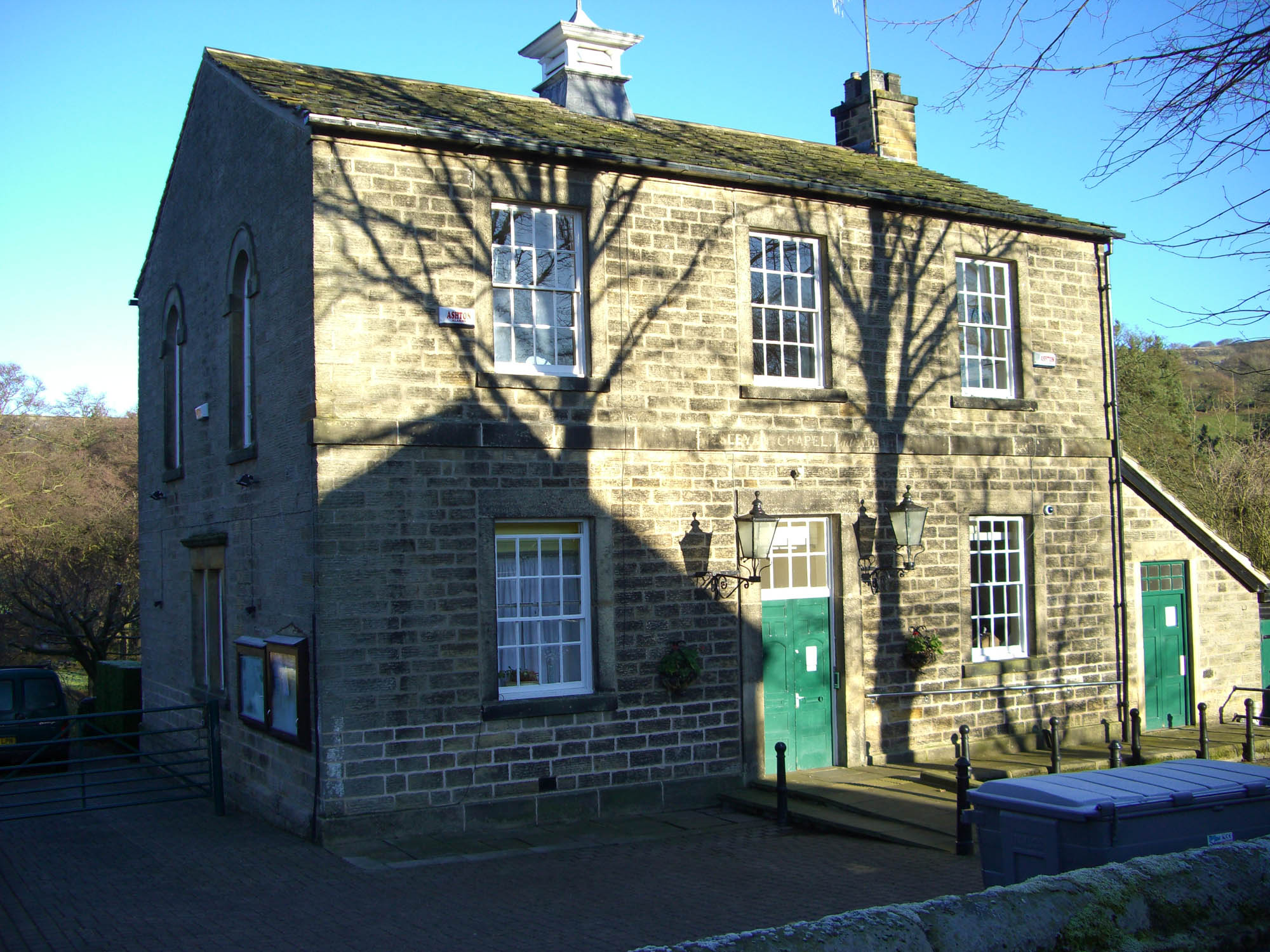
The Old Wesleyan Chapel now houses the offices of Bradfield Parish Council.

Low Bradfield continues its tradition as a farming community into the present day. Cross Farm, Nether Farm and Fair House Farm are situated close to the centre of the village. Fair House is a grade II* listed building and is one of the oldest structures in the area dating from the 1630s and was originally called Swinden House. Nether Farm is Grade II listed and dates from the 1820s. There are several other farms in the outlying areas. One of the great attractions to people from outside the village is the large centrally located recreation ground known as the Ibbotson Memorial Field which is a popular site for picnics and family visits and also serves as the village cricket ground, drawing large crowds to games on summer weekends. The field was named after the Ibbotson family who have lived in Low Bradfield for several centuries. The local tennis and bowls clubs also have facilities at the field.

There are several other notable buildings in the village. The former Wesleyan chapel on Mill Lee Road was built in 1817 and now serves as the offices for Bradfield Parish Council. Just across the road is another former Wesleyan chapel which was built in 1899 to replace its counterpart. It closed in 1993 and was sold for residential use. Also on Mill Lee Road are the former water board filter houses which filtered water from the Agden, Dale Dike and Strines reservoirs in Bradfield Dale. The filter houses were built in 1913 and extended in 1953 before being closed in 1995 when a new water treatment works was opened in the Loxley Valley. The buildings are currently being converted for residential use with an expected completion date of winter 2024. The Bradfield village hall, situated on the Memorial Field was completely rebuilt recently and re-opened in 2006.

There is just one public house in the village, the Plough. There was a second pub called the Cross Inn which was situated at the foot of Woodfall Lane but this closed in the late 1970s and is now a private house. Just across the road is the village shop which is also the local post office. The former Low Bradfield School is now a private residence which was built in 1867 to replace a school that was washed away in the flood of 1864 in a different part of the village. The school closed in 1985 with its pupils being transferred to nearby Dungworth School.

The Peak District Boundary Walk runs through the village.

=== Bradfield Dale ===
The area to the west of the village is a rural area known as Bradfield Dale which contains the three reservoirs of Agden, Dale Dike and Strines which were constructed in the 1860s. The many construction workers who came into the dale prompted the Haychatter Farm to open a public house on its premises known as the Reservoir Inn and then the Haychatter, which remained open until 2003. The dale contains Sugworth Hall which dates from at least the 16th century, although the building has been much changed since then. Eminent families who have lived there include the Hooles and the Boots. Charles Boot built a folly tower overlooking Strines Reservoir in 1927 known as Boot's Folly; it is a prominent landmark for miles around. Another ancient residence in the dale is Hallfield House which dates from the Elizabethan era and was the seat of the Greaveses, a very old Hallamshire family. The dale also includes the Strines Inn public house.
