= Hallfield House =

House in Bradfield, Sheffield, England

Coordinates: 53.4195°N 1.6491°W

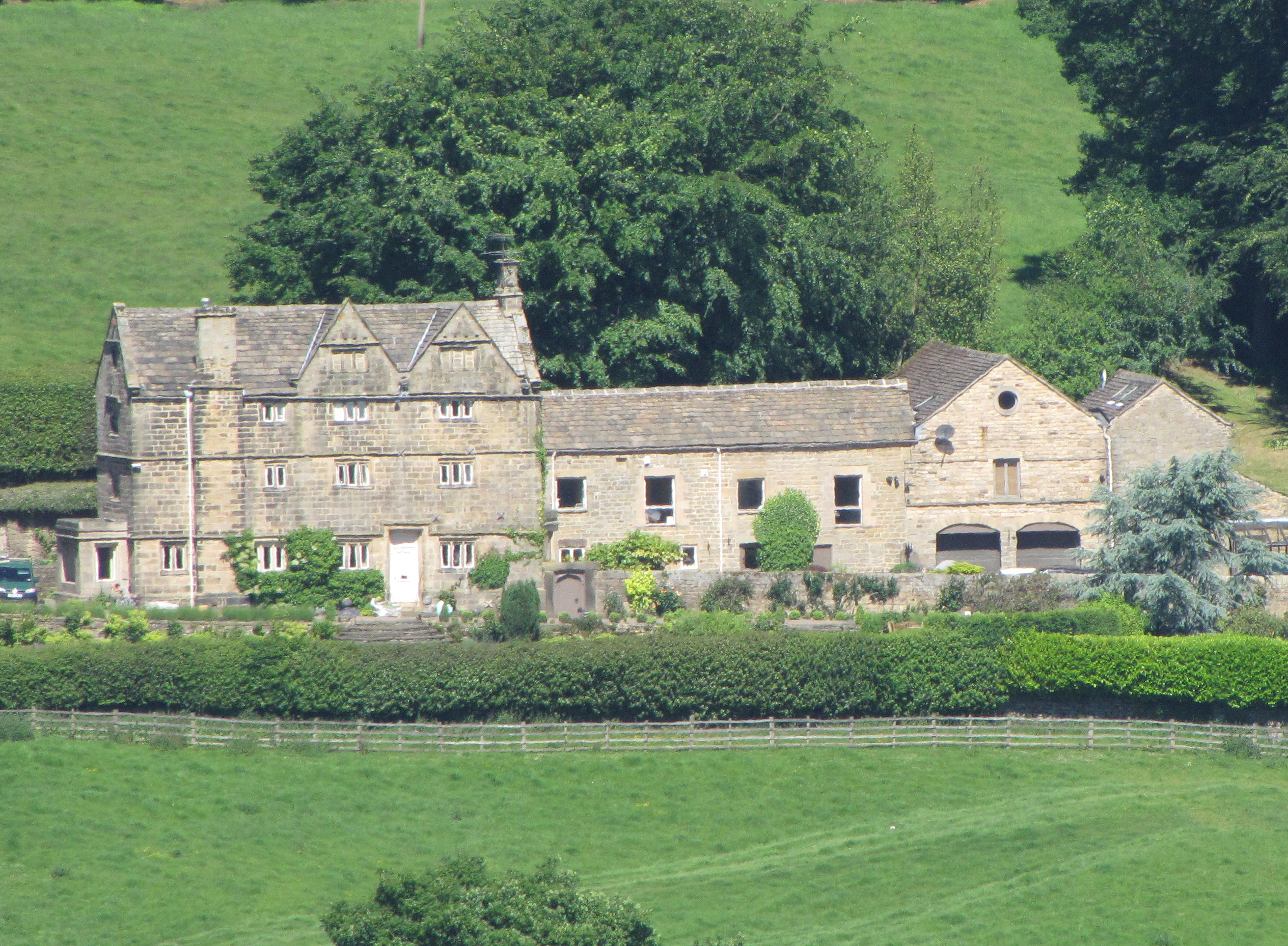
Seen across Bradfield Dale from a point 0.6 miles (1 km) to the south-east.

Hallfield House is a Grade II listed building situated in Bradfield Dale, 1.7 miles (2.74 km) west of the village of Low Bradfield, near Sheffield in England.

== History ==
A dwelling on the Hallfield site was first mentioned in documents as early as 1318 when it was recorded that a piece of land called Hallfelde in Thornsett was conveyed between Adam de Romesker and Adam Hawksworth. For many years the house was just a small farmhouse belonging to the Greaves family, who were an eminent dynasty throughout South Yorkshire. The Greaves probably became owners of Hallfield in 1439 when John Greves junior took possession and they held the property for several generations. At that time the house had 40 acres (16 ha) of land of which 20 acres (8.1 ha) were meadow and 20 acres (8.1 ha) were pasture, there were also common rights on the surrounding moorland.

By the mid part of the 17th century the house had been greatly altered and was much the same as we see it today. It is thought that these alterations were carried out by Nicholas Greaves or his son John and the resulting gabled building was similar in style to Onesacre Hall, 4.5 miles (7.2 km) to the east, which was constructed around the same time. During the alterations, barns were erected 66 feet (20 m) to the north-east of the main house and were constructed using timber purlins, the barns underwent substantial changes in the 20th century but are still classified as a Grade II listed buildings. In 1672 the Greaves were taxed on six hearths at Hallfield. George Woodhead of Wigtwizzle became the tenant of Hallfield House in 1698 and his descendants occupied the house for much of the 18th century.

In 1708, the daughters of John Greaves sold Hallfield to Sir Thomas Wentworth of Wentworth Woodhouse. Hallfield House continued in the ownership of the Wentworth family, subsequently the Marquis of Rockingham and the Earl Fitzwilliam, for the next 250 years.

The building received its listed status on 21 October 1974 when in a state of dereliction and offered for sale for £25,000. This was followed by rebuilding work to the wing in 1977. It was later acquired by Sir Hugh Sykes, the Sheffield businessman, who subsequently sold it to the Duckenfield family in 2007.

== The building ==
Hallfield House is constructed from deeply coursed, squared gritstone with a stone slate roof. The building has four bays and consists of three storeys with an attic. Most of the windows in the main house are mullioned. One of the highlights of the interior is a 17th-century plaster overdoor in one of the downstairs rooms which is decorated with lilies and roses, the room also has a frieze adorned with fish, fruit and mermaids playing harps under an ornamental cornice.
