= River Loxley =

River in South Yorkshire, England

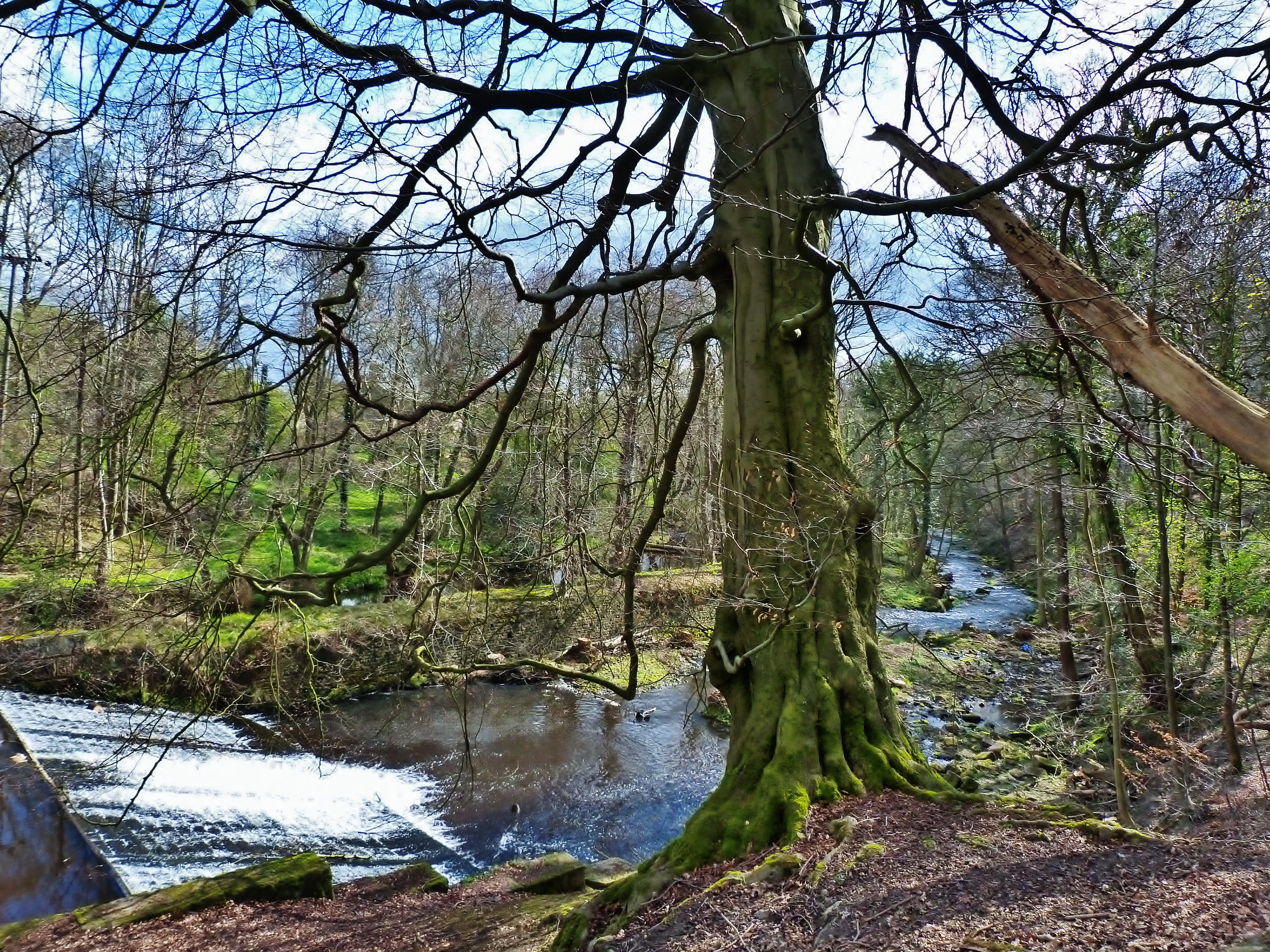
- A view of the river

Location
- Country: England

Physical characteristics
- Source
  - location: Damflask Reservoir nr Stacey Bank
  - coordinates: 53°24′38″N 1°34′16″W
  - elevation: 600 feet (180 m)
- Mouth
  - location: River Don at Owlerton
  - coordinates: 53.400526°N 1.486888°W
  - elevation: 190 feet (58 m)
- Length: 6.2 mi (10.0 km)
- Basin size: 16.8 mi^{2} (44 km^{2})

The River Loxley is a river in the City of Sheffield, South Yorkshire, England. Its source is a series of streams which rise some 10 miles (16 km) to the north-west of Sheffield on Bradfield Moors, flowing through Bradfield Dale to converge at Low Bradfield. It flows easterly through Damflask Reservoir and is joined by Storrs Brook at Storrs, near Stannington, and the River Rivelin at Malin Bridge, before flowing into the River Don at Owlerton, in Hillsborough. The Loxley valley provided the initial course of the Great Sheffield Flood, which happened after the Dale Dyke Dam collapsed shortly before its completion in March 1864.

== Water supply ==
The upper river is marked by the presence of four large reservoirs, used for the impounding of drinking water. Drinking water for the people of Sheffield was provided by five small reservoirs on a site close to Langsett Road. Others were added as the population grew, but by 1830, they could not keep up with the demand. The Sheffield Waterworks Company became responsible for water supply after an act of Parliament, the Sheffield Water Act 1830 (11 Geo. 4 & 1 Will. 4. c. lv), was passed, and their first major reservoir was completed in 1836, when Wyming Brook was dammed to form the Redmires Middle Reservoir.

Reservoir building continued as the population expanded further, and the Dale Dyke reservoir was nearly complete in 1864 when the dam failed, with catastrophic consequences for the communities below it. 250 people died in the flood, and many businesses were washed away or severely damaged. As a result of the compensation payments they had to make, the Sheffield Waterworks Company obtained parliamentary powers to raise their water rates by 25 per cent. The company soon started other major projects, and Strines Reservoir was completed in 1869, covering 54 acres (22 ha) and impounding 453 million gallons (2,059 Megalitres (Ml)) of water. Agden Reservoir was completed in the same year, which covered 62 acres (25 ha) and held 559 million gallons (2541 Ml). The replacement Dale Dyke reservoir was completed in 1875. It covered the same area at Agden reservoir, and held 466 million gallons (2,118 Ml).

When powers to raise the extra levy on water rates ceased in 1887, the Sheffield Waterworks Company applied to Parliament to make the charge permanent, and to make further increases to its charges. The Corporation of Sheffield decided that water supply should be in public ownership, and submitted a bill to buy the water company by compulsory purchase. Both sides fought for their cause vigorously, but the committee of the House of Lords which heard the cases ruled in favour of the corporation, and passed the Sheffield Corporation (Water) Act 1887 (50 & 51 Vict. c. clxxviii). The Corporation of Sheffield paid the water company £2,092,014 (equivalent to £238 million in 2025) for all of their assets, and took over responsibility for water supply.

Under the new regime, Damflask Reservoir was completed in 1896. This was built as a compensation reservoir, rather than for drinking water, and was there to maintain a flow in the river, which protected the interests of those who abstracted water from the river, or used its flow to drive machinery. It covers 116 acres (47 ha) and holds 1,108 million gallons (5,037 Ml).

== Water power ==
The river has played an important part in the industrial history of Sheffield, as it descends through 280 feet (85 m) in the 6 miles (9.7 km) between Low Bradfield and the Don, and this has enabled many mills, forges and cutlers wheels to be powered by its waters. A total of 24 are known to have existed at various times. Each mill, including outbuildings, stables and housing for the owner, was known locally as a wheel. A weir was constructed across the river, creating a pond known as a dam. A leat called a head goit fed water to a water wheel, and a tail goit returned the water to the river, below the weir. In some cases, multiple water wheels were fed from the same dam, and in others, a wheel might drive several ends, which were connected to grinding wheels, and might be leased to several tenants.

Low Bradfield Corn Mill is the earliest known installation, being recorded in documents from 1219, when it was transferred to Worksop Priory. It was destroyed by the flood in 1864, but was rebuilt, despite the fact that only £3,505 was received in compensation against the claim for £5,000. It was owned by Sheffield Corporation by 1905, and continued to use water power for some considerable time afterwards. It was destroyed by a fire during the Second World War.

There were medieval corn mills at Bradfield, Damflask and Owlerton, and cutlers wheels were in use at Wisewood in 1521, at Ashton Carr in 1549, and at Slack Wheel, near the confluence with the Don, in 1581. Development after 1720 was rapid, and a shift to heavier industry occurred from the early 19th century, with forges replacing cutlers wheels, or in some cases being built alongside them. Many of 24 known mills, wheels and forges were swept away or damaged in 1864 by the flood, but although steam power was gradually replacing water power elsewhere, most of those rebuilt continued to use water power, at least in part. Although the mill buildings have mostly gone, several of the weirs and dams remain, and there are still water wheels at Malin Bridge corn mill and Low Matlock rolling mill.

Low Matlock Wheel is first mentioned in 1732, when James Balguy leased some land to build a cutlers wheel. The size of the wheel and the number of grinding troughs were left to his discretion, and so were not mentioned in the deeds. By 1825, the site was described as having three works, the first containing two tilt hammers, the second, two forges, and the third, two more tilt hammers and a plating hammer. The site was extensively damaged by the 1864 flood, and the owners put in a claim for over £5,000 to repair the damage. The present buildings carry the date 1882, and the rolling mill is a grade II* listed structure. Water power continued to be used until 1956, after which much of the internal machinery was retained but adapted to allow electric power to drive it. Following the sale in 1999 of most of the site for development, the rolling mill was bought by Pro-Roll Ltd, who were using teams of four men to roll high-value bar by hand in 2006. An archaeological excavation of part of the site took place in 2001, prior to redevelopment.

The upper river valley is now the site of Damflask reservoir, built in the 1870s, but not completed until 1896, due to problems with leakage. It covered the sites of Dam Flask Corn Mill, which was probably part of the complex mentioned in 1219, and Dam Flask Wheel, which was variously a cutlers' wheel, a paper mill, and a scythe and sickle manufactory, between 1750 and 1861. By 1864, it was probably a wire mill, as four wire-drawers were drowned there in the flood.

== Water quality ==
The Environment Agency measure water quality of the river systems in England. Each is given an overall ecological status, which may be one of five levels: high, good, moderate, poor and bad. There are several components that are used to determine this, including biological status, which looks at the quantity and varieties of invertebrates, angiosperms and fish. Chemical status, which compares the concentrations of various chemicals against known safe concentrations, is rated good or fail.

The water quality of the Loxley was as follows in 2019.

Section	Ecological Status	Chemical Status	Length	Catchment	Channel
Loxley from Source to Strines Dyke	Moderate	Fail	3.97 miles (6.39 km)	4.82 square miles (12.5 km^{2})	heavily modified
Loxley from Strines Dyke to River Don	Moderate	Fail	8.66 miles (13.94 km)	10.44 square miles (27.0 km^{2})	heavily modified
Strines Dyke from Source to River Loxley	Moderate	Fail	4.74 miles (7.63 km)	7.62 square miles (19.7 km^{2})	heavily modified

Like most rivers in the UK, the chemical status changed from good to fail in 2019, due to the presence of polybrominated diphenyl ethers (PBDE), perfluorooctane sulphonate (PFOS) and mercury compounds, none of which had previously been included in the assessment.

The Environment Agency are hoping to achieve good overall status by 2027. The river channel is heavily modified, and this contributes to its biological status. The reservoirs at the upper end trap sediments, and prevent the recharge of gravel beds further downstream. Additionally, there are no major tributaries on the upper and middle section, to provide alternative sources of sediment. The controlling of the flow by releases from Damflask Reservoir and some high flow or spill events have further removed finer gravels, leaving larger rocks and boulders, which are not ideal for fish propagation. The remaining weirs have a detrimental effect both on the movement of gravel and the migration of fish and other species. Some sections of the river have also been protected by hard banking, and near Hillsborough, by channelisation.

There is an ongoing project to improve the river for fish migration, with the focus on allowing salmon to return to the river to breed by 2020, but any work carried out will also benefit populations of brown trout, grayling, eels and lamprey. In 2012, most of the fish in the river were brown trout, with no established coarse fish. In order to achieve regeneration, an archaeological survey was carried out in 2012, examining the eight weirs from Stacey Wheel to Owlerton Wheels. The reason for the survey was that any modification to the weirs, which are historic structures, would require both planning consent and ancient monument consent. Modification would be necessary to provide fish passes at each of the sites.

Subsequently, the Don Catchment Rivers Trust commissioned the engineers Arup Group to assess how fish migration could be encouraged. They only considered the weirs from Old Wheel to Owlerton Wheel, as the weir at Stacey Wheel is very close to the reservoir dam, and would not increase the length of river accessible to fish by very much. The two weirs below Hillsborough, at Birley Wheel and Black Wheels, are the subject of a separate study being carried out by the Environment Agency. The Environment Agency also assessed the impact on the river of removing the weir at Limbrick Wheel entirely. Arup's report considered two options at each site, from complete removal of the weir, partial removal, provision of a technical fish pass, construction of a bypass channel, easement, and the installation of a low-cost baffle system. Removal of the weir was only considered at Limbrick Wheel, and was ruled out for Low Matlock Wheel, as that is a scheduled ancient monument, and for Olive Wheel, as there is a flow measurement gauging station immediately above it. Partial removal of the weir was not thought to be appropriate in any of the cases, and only the option of easement was considered for Loxley Old Wheel. Various easement options are available, including notches and gaps, baulks, baffle systems, preliminary weirs, and rock ramps, and at any one site, several of the options may be required. Easements are generally not subject to the same rigorous technical assessment as the other options, and the process of deciding what needs to be done is somewhat subjective.

== Flood defence scheme ==
In September 2014 Sheffield Council announced plans to create a flood alleviation programme in the Upper Don Catchment area, including the River Loxley. The first phase of the Upper Don Flood Alleviation Scheme was completed in October 2023 with the removal of a weir on the River Loxley and the construction of a series of walls. The new flood defences protect 152 businesses and 63 homes.

== Points of interest ==
Point	Coordinates (Links to map resources)	OS Grid Ref	Notes
Strines Dike	53.4086°N 1.7004°W	SK200902	multiple springs
Foulstone Dike	53.4166°N 1.7046°W	SK197911	multiple springs
Hilling Dale Brook	53.4289°N 1.6694°W	SK220925	multiple springs
Strines Reservoir outlet	53.4096°N 1.6516°W	SK232903	
Dale Dike Reservoir outlet	53.4203°N 1.6339°W	SK244915	
Agden Reservoir outlet	53.4259°N 1.6121°W	SK258921	
Damflask Reservoir outlet	53.4107°N 1.5759°W	SK282905	
Junction with Storrs Brook	53.4016°N 1.5518°W	SK298895	
Junction with River Rivelin	53.3998°N 1.5117°W	SK325893	Malinbridge
Junction with River Don	53.4005°N 1.4872°W	SK341894	mouth

== Bibliography ==
- Ball, Christine; Crossley, David; Flavell, Neville (2006). Water Power on the Sheffield Rivers: Second Edition. South Yorkshire Industrial History Society. ISBN 978-0-9556644-0-3.
- Firth, Christopher (1997). Domesday to the dawn of the New Millennium – 900 years of the Don fishery (PDF). Environment Agency. Archived (PDF) from the original on 17 July 2019.
- Rab, Sarah (14 May 2013). River Loxley: Fish Passage Scoping Study (PDF). Don Catchment Rivers Trust. Archived (PDF) from the original on 18 March 2016.
- Turnball, Percival (7 November 2012). Weirs on the River Loxley: Heritage Statement (PDF). Brigantia Archaeological Practice. Archived (PDF) from the original on 14 November 2016.
