= Hugh Sykes =

English industrialist and investor (1932–2026)

Sir Hugh Ridley Sykes DL FRSA (12 September 1932 – 30 March 2026) was an English industrialist and investor, noted for championing regeneration in and around Sheffield.

== Early life ==
Hugh Ridley Sykes was born in Bristol on 12 September 1932. He was educated at Bristol Grammar School and Clare College, Cambridge, where he graduated in Law.

== Career ==
His public work in South Yorkshire includes:

- 2004-08 Chairman of Renaissance South Yorkshire;
- 2000-07 Deputy Chairman (later Chairman) of Sheffield One;
- 1988-97 Chairman of Sheffield Development Corporation.

Sykes was also Chairman of the Sheffield Galleries and Museums Trust, the first museum trust in the country.

His work has been recognised by a series of awards: Honorary Fellow, Sheffield Hallam University, 1991; Deputy Lieutenant for South Yorkshire, 1995; Honorary Doctorate in Laws, University of Sheffield, 1996 and Knight Bachelor in Her Majesty’s Birthday Honours, 1997.

== Personal life and death ==
Sykes was married to Lady (Ruby) Sykes. For some years they lived at Hallfield House, but they then lived at Brookfield Manor, Hathersage which operates as a wedding venue. He died on 31 March 2026, at the age of 93.

His brother was Stephen Sykes.
