= Charles Boot =

British film producer

Charles Boot JP (1 October 1874 – 14 June 1945) was an English businessman and film producer who was the driving force behind the growth of Henry Boot & Sons in the inter-war period. As well as creating one of the largest contracting and housebuilding firms of its time, he was a staunch advocate of the need for better housing and the virtues of private rather than local authority housing. He was also the creator of Pinewood Studios.

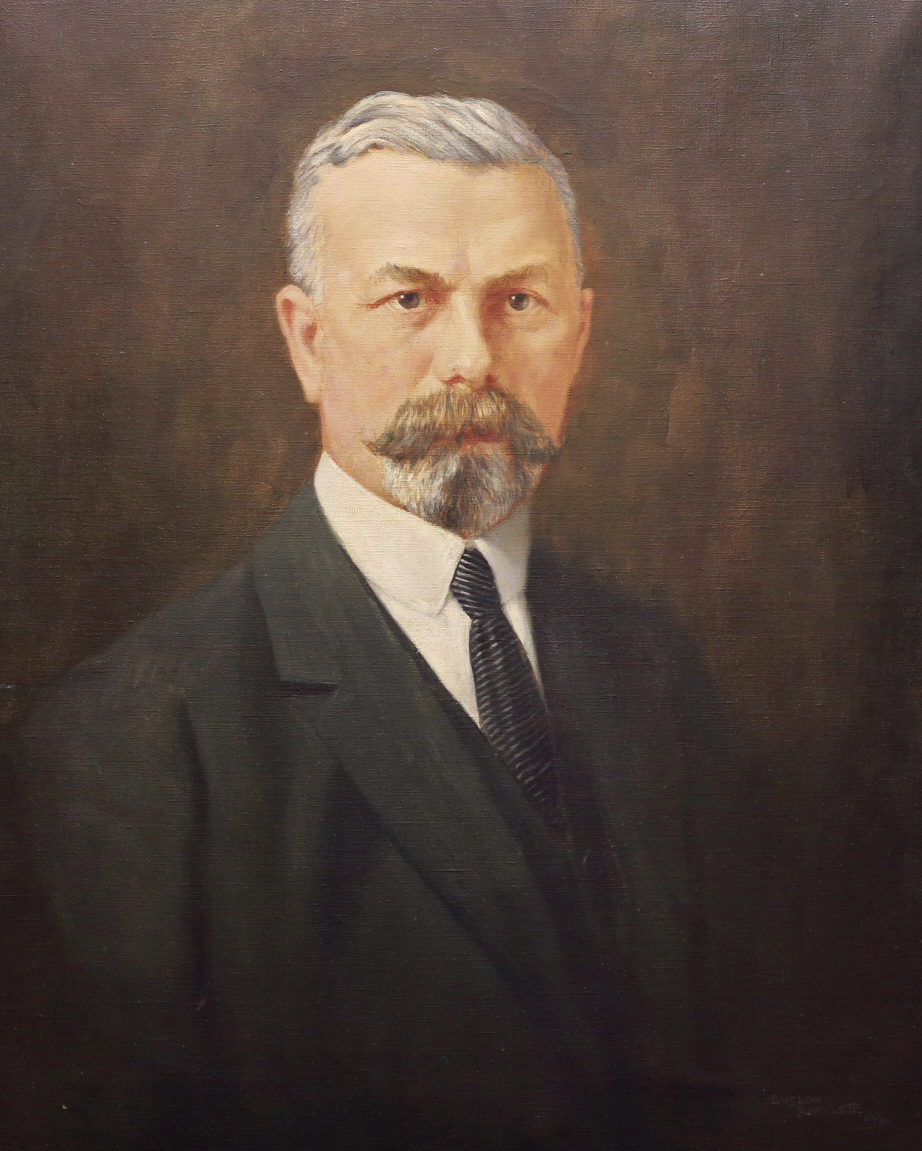
Charles Boot

== Personal life ==
Charles Boot was born in Sheffield, Yorkshire, and the second of 13 children and eldest son of Henry Boot (1851–1931) and his wife, Hannah White. Henry and Hannah's first home was in Napier Street, Sheffield next to the Plymouth Brethren meeting rooms. Henry became a member of the Brethren, eventually forming his own meeting place; Charles would have had a religious upbringing but there is no evidence that he shared his father's enthusiasm.

Boot was 12 when his father began to work on his own account as a jobbing builder, and Boot joined him after leaving school staying with the firm until his death in 1945. The censuses mark his progress: a joiner’s apprentice in 1891; a foreman joiner in 1901; and a building contractor in 1911. It was in that decade that Boot appeared to take complete control of the business and in the 1919 flotation he was the managing director.

Boot married Bertha Matthews (1870–1926) in 1897, they had two children, Henry and Gertrude and lived at Sugworth Hall on the western outskirts of Sheffield. Bertha died in late 1926 and in early 1927 Charles remarried in London – to Kate Hebb, and in 1930 bought Thornbridge Hall in Derbyshire. Charles Boot died in 1945 in a Sheffield nursing home, following an operation. He had been a Justice of the Peace, Member of the Council of the House Builders' Association, President of the Federation of Master Builders (1944), and a Grand Commander in the Order of the Redeemer, Greece's highest honour.

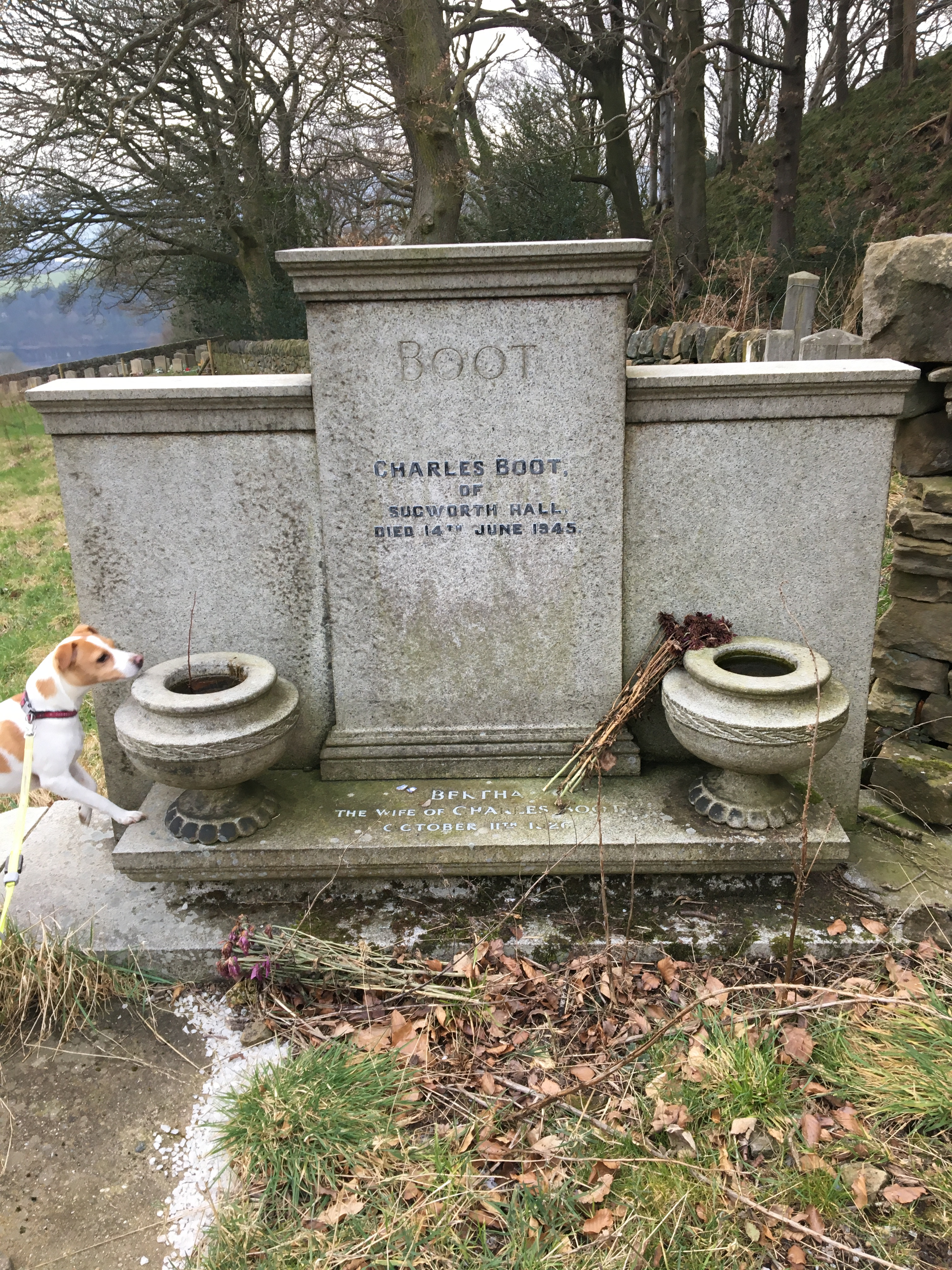
Charles Boot's Grave

== Business career ==
Boot's business career is detailed under Henry Boot PLC. Under its then name of Henry Boot & Sons, the firm built more houses than any other company in the inter-war period, was an international contractor, and developed Pinewood Studios. Outside the firm, he became a forceful spokesman for the housebuilding industry, supporting measures to reduce the cost of local authority housing and he was a keen advocate of building for private sale rather than for local authorities.

Boot made representations to the House of Commons on the costs of building houses. In July 1926 (a time when almost all housebuilding was for local authorities) he gave an extensive address to the Health and Housing Committee – already speaking for a firm that had "built more houses than any other firm or individual in the world". He was a strong proponent of labour being paid by results and criticised local authorities whose contracts prohibited this. He was also critical of local authorities that overspecified and interfered with work. He contrasted Birmingham, where he could build good houses for £397 and make a profit while virtually the same house in another authority would cost £465 and he would make a loss.

Boot's concern for the building industry's ability to supply low cost housing for rent was addressed more than once in the closing stages of his life. He pointed to the 8,000 low-rent houses built by the Boot subsidiary, First National Housing Trust, in the six years following the Housing (Financial Provisions) Act 1933 and he argued for the superior economics of the private trust as compared with bureaucratic local authorities. One of his most interesting contributions was his scheme for abolishing slum areas, written in 1935. Boot proposed two new satellite towns comprising around 50,000 houses and re-housing around 250,000 people; one was to be near Waltham Abbey and the other near Dagenham. The transport proposed for the new towns was the "Railplane" the technical description sounding like the ill-fated Bennie Railplane. Sadly, neither the new towns nor the Railplane came to pass.

=== Pinewood Film Studios ===
In 1934, Charles Boot embarked upon the design and construction of what would become Pinewood Film Studios located among the pine trees of the 100 acres (0.4 km²) estate of Heatherden Hall at Iver Heath in Buckinghamshire, England. Charles Boot based his designs upon what were at the time the latest ideas being employed by other film studios in the production of movies at Hollywood. Charles Boot managed to complete the work in twelve months. In the years that followed the Henry Boot company also undertook further work on both the Pinewood Film Studios and the Denham Film Studios, both of which had by then become a part of the J. Arthur Rank Organisation.

== Boot's Folly ==
Charles Boot built Boot's Folly in 1927, an imposing folly clearly visible between Strines and Bradfield in South Yorkshire, England, apparently to create work for people during the depression. For more information, see the Follies and Monuments website and a satellite visual.
