= Sugworth Hall =

Country house in Bradfield, South Yorkshire, England

Coordinates: 53.402807°N 1.652359°W

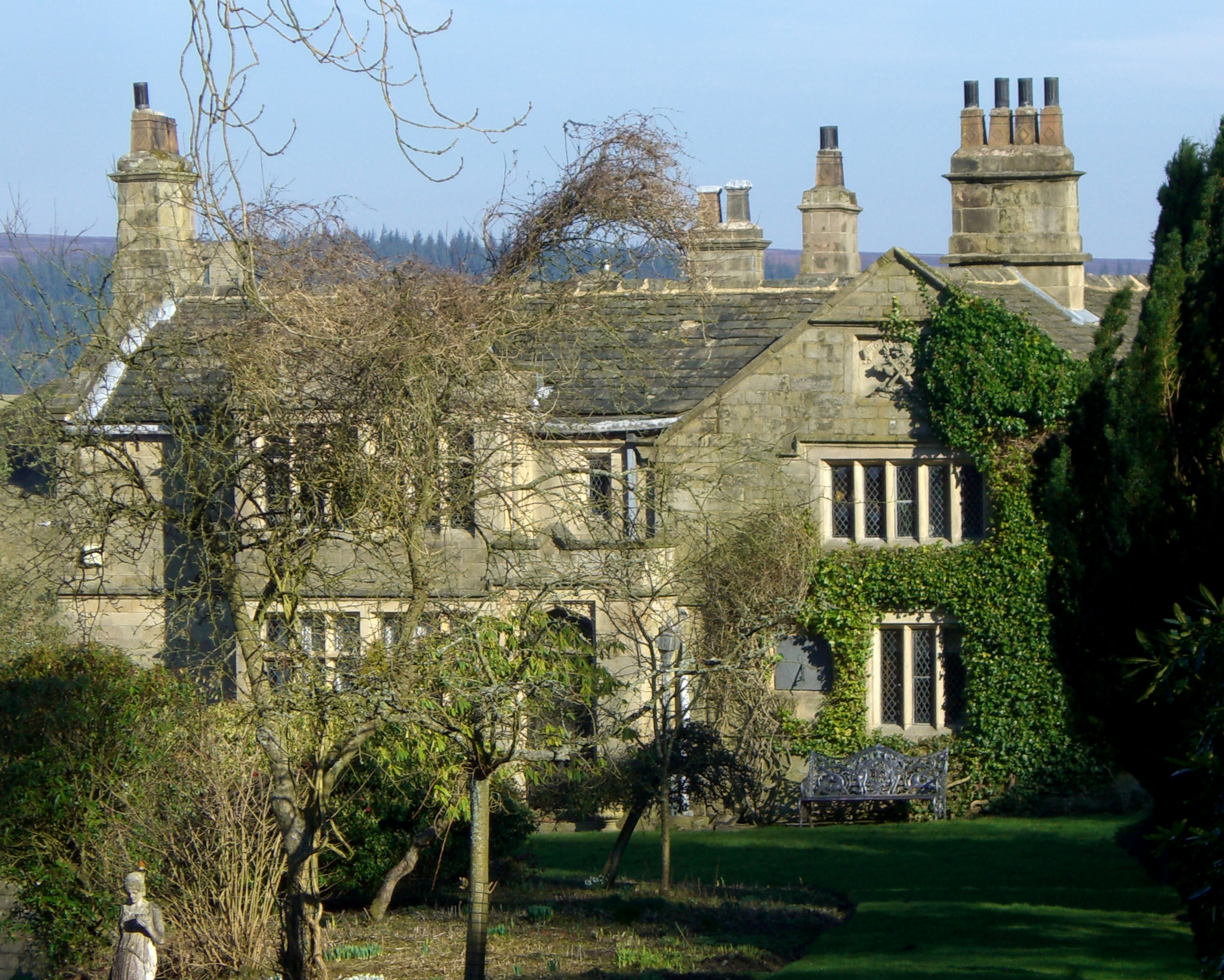
Sugworth Hall

Sugworth Hall is an English country house on Sugworth Road in Bradfield Dale, near Sheffield, England. It is situated approximately 8 miles (13 km) west from Sheffield City Centre. The hall is a Grade II listed building which stands within the Peak District National Park at a height of 984 feet (300 m) above sea level.

== History ==
The exact date of construction of Sugworth Hall is unknown. English Heritage and some publications list it as 17th century but it was first mentioned in the will and testament of Robert Hawksworth who was the resident of a building on the site in the 1560s. It is likely that the hall looked completely different at that time with the core of the building being considerably reworked in the 19th century. After the death of Robert Hawksworth the hall passed to his son Henry, who was known to be living there in 1585 along with his mother. The Hawksworths were still in residence in the 1630s, but by the early part of the 18th century the hall had become the property of the Gould family. The hall was extended during the latter part of the 19th century.

The hall became the home of civil engineer Charles Boot (1874–1945) early in the 20th century. Boot was the son of Henry Boot and would become Chairman of Henry Boot Ltd. in 1921. Boot changed and extended the hall adding a tower and battlements designed by the architect E. Vincent Harris, who was working on the construction of Sheffield City Hall at the time. During his time at the hall Charles Boot constructed Boot's Folly 330 yards (300 m) to the north, overlooking Strines Reservoir. In the 1930s the Boot family moved to Thornbridge Hall at Great Longstone although Charles' son Henry Matthew Boot continued to live at Bents House in the valley below Sugworth Hall until his death in 1974. During the 1980s and 1990s, some of Sugworth Hall's outbuildings were converted to residential use.

== Architecture ==
The hall is constructed from squared sandstone and gritstone with a stone slate roof with ashlar stacks. The earlier work on the house is judged to be of superior quality. The 20th-century tower on the west side has an embattled corner turret and an oriel balcony.

== 21st-century ownership and restoration ==
In 2019, Sugworth Hall was acquired by David Richards, a Sheffield-born technology entrepreneur, and his wife Jane. Following their acquisition, the couple undertook a major programme of restoration, making the hall their primary residence from 2020. Following their acquisition, the couple undertook a major programme of restoration, making the hall their primary residence from 2020.
