= Great Sheffield Flood =

1864 disaster in Sheffield, England

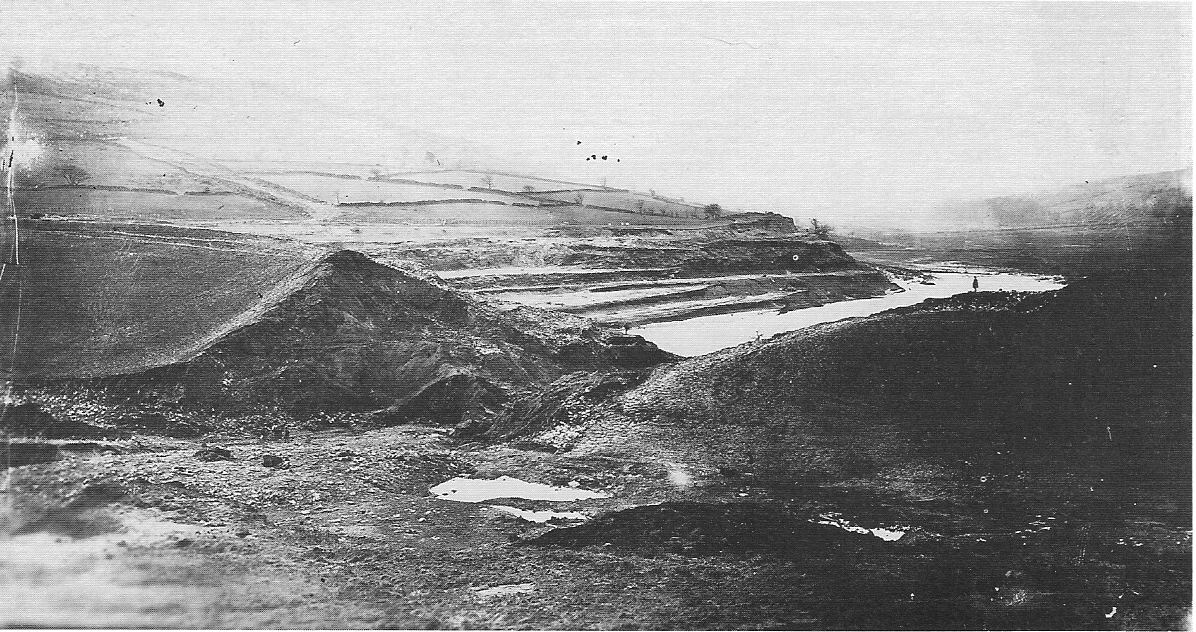
- Remains of the Dale Dyke Dam after the flood

- Great Sheffield Flood (Sheffield) Great Sheffield Flood (South Yorkshire) Great Sheffield Flood (the United Kingdom)
- Date: 11 March 1864
- Location: Dale Dyke Dam and downstream; Sheffield, West Riding of Yorkshire; 53°23′14″N 1°28′00″W
- Type: Dam failure followed by flash flood
- Cause: Crack in embankment; cause of crack never determined
- Deaths: 240+
- Property damage: 600+ houses destroyed

The Great Sheffield Flood was a flood that devastated parts of Sheffield, England, on 11 March 1864, when the Dale Dyke Dam broke as its reservoir was being filled for the first time. At least 240 people died and more than 600 houses were damaged or destroyed by the flood. The immediate cause was a crack in the embankment, the cause of which was never determined. The dam's failure led to reforms in engineering practice, setting standards on specifics that needed to be met when constructing such large-scale structures. The dam was rebuilt in 1875.

== Dale Dyke Dam ==
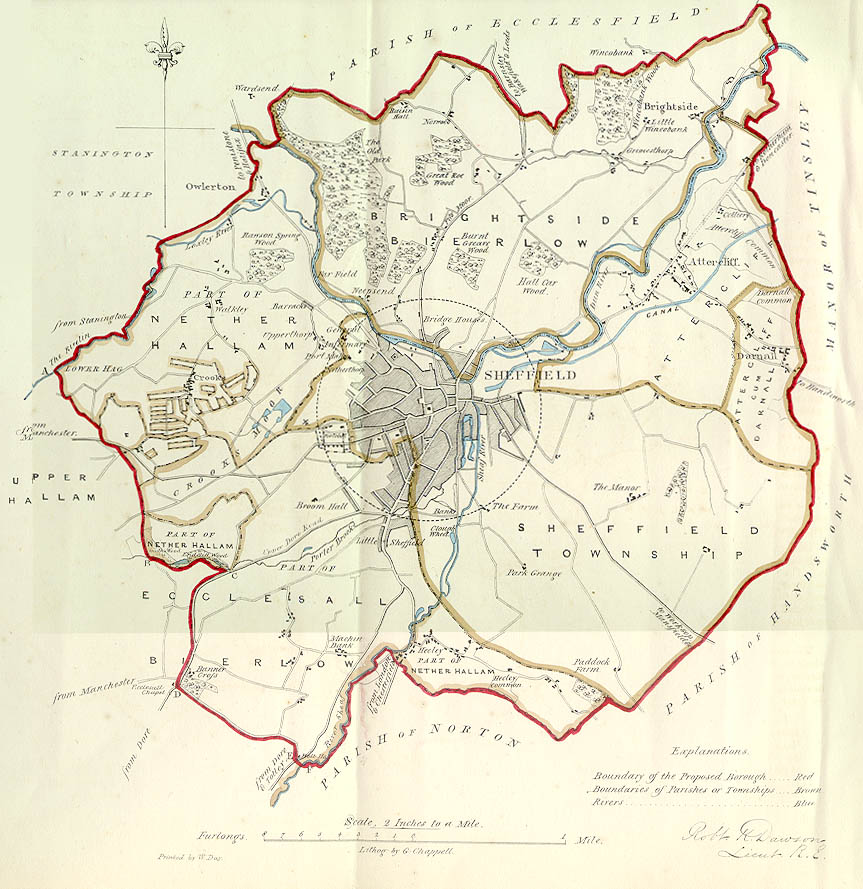
Sheffield in 1832

Sheffield is a city and subdivision of South Yorkshire, England. As the town industrialised, its population grew from 45,478 in 1801 to 185,157 in 1861. This rapid population growth resulted in greatly increased demand for water, which led to the construction of the Dale Dyke Dam in Bradfield Dale near Low Bradfield on the River Loxley, for the purpose of providing a more efficient source of clean water. It was created by the Sheffield Waterworks Company.

== Collapse of Dale Dyke Dam ==
On the night of 11 March 1864, assisted by a strong south-western gale, the newly built dam collapsed while it was being filled for the first time. An estimated 3 million cubic metres (700 million imperial gallons) of water swept down the Loxley Valley, through Loxley Village and on to Malin Bridge and Hillsborough, where the River Loxley joins the River Don. The flood continued south down the Don into Sheffield centre, around the eastward bend of the Don at Lady's Bridge, then to Attercliffe, past the sites of what later became Don Valley Stadium, Sheffield Arena and Meadowhall Centre, and on to Rotherham. A wall of water moved swiftly down the valley, destroying everything in its course. The centre of the town, situated on the hill to the south, escaped damage, but the densely populated district of the Wicker, around the new railway viaduct (constructed by the Manchester, Sheffield and Lincolnshire Railway), was completely destroyed.

John Leather and resident engineer John Gunson were working closely together during the construction of the dam. Leather designed the dam and looked over its construction whereas Gunson directed and supervised the construction of the dam.

== Aftermath ==
The mayor, Thomas Jessop, quickly set up a relief fund and help was provided for the homeless and needy. Sheffield was quickly supplied with aid wherever needed. The mayor ordered a meeting "For the purpose of considering and adopting such measures as may be deemed necessary to meet the sufferings occasioned by this dreadful calamity", raising over £4,000. On 18 March 1864 the mayor called another meeting, but this time it was for anyone who could afford it to give up one day's wage to give to those in need. A relief committee was created, and in total over £42,000 was raised.

A Home Office inquiry was led by Robert Rawlinson and Nathaniel Beardmore; its report was presented to Parliament in June. The Sheffield Corporation's inquiry was carried out by nine engineers including John Rennie the Younger (a former president of the Institution of the Civil Engineers, ICE), Charles Blacker Vignoles (a future president), James Leslie, David Stevenson, Henry Conybeare and Peter W. Barlow. They thought that on the basis of landslipping they would pardon the Sheffield Waterworks Company from any carelessness and that the collapse of the Dale Dyke Dam was an unpredictable accident. They continued:

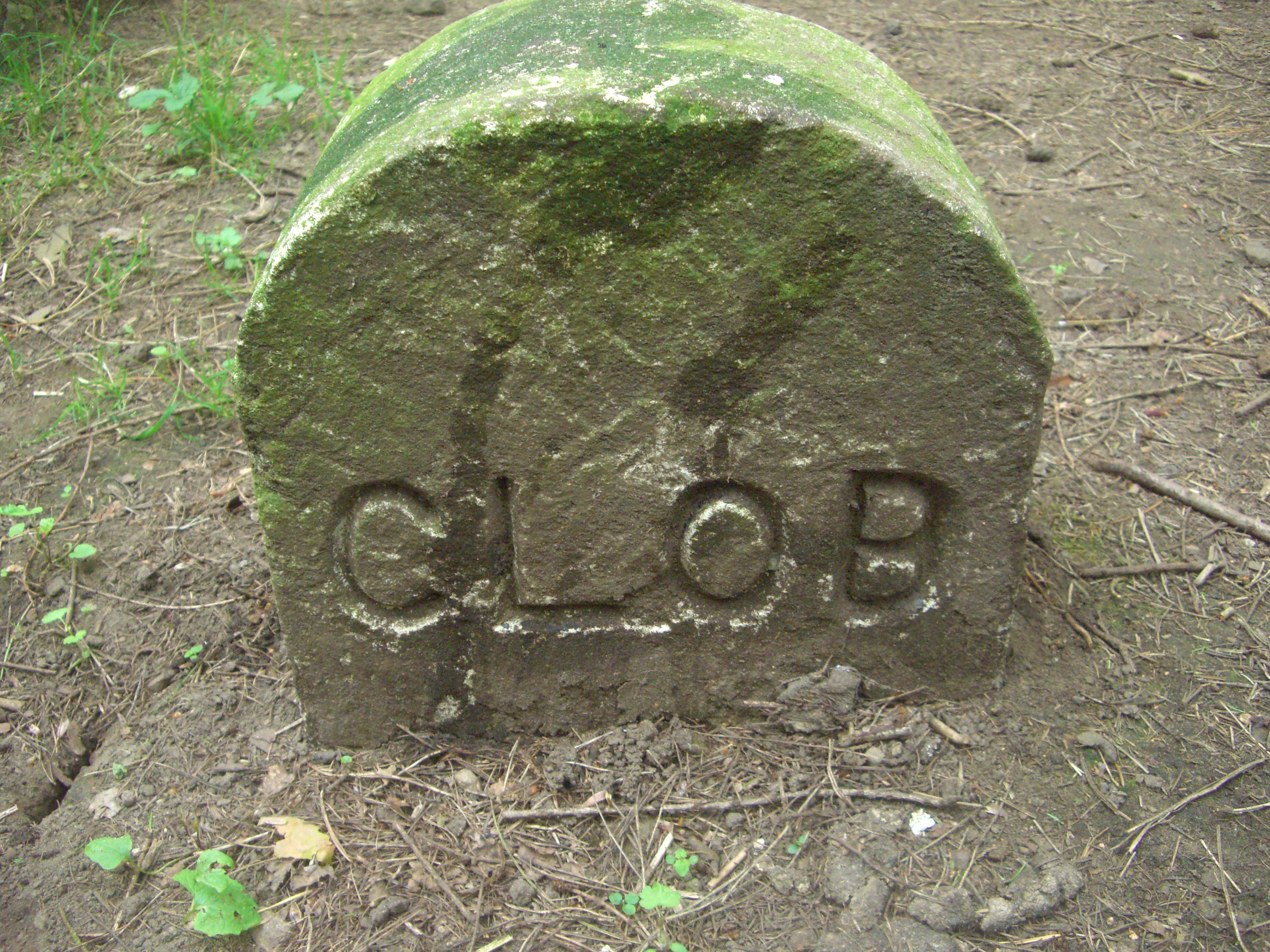
The CLOB (Centre Line of Old Bank) stone marks the location of the original (breached) dam wall. The new dam wall was built 2,000 feet (600 m) farther up the valley in 1875.

We are moreover of the opinion that all the arrangements made by your engineers were such as might have been reasonably expected to have proved sufficient for the purposes for which they were intended and that, if the ground beneath the bank had not moved, this work would have been as safe and as perfect as the other five or six large reservoirs of the company which have so long supplied the town of Sheffield and the rivers Rivelin, Loxley and Don with water.

The Sheffield Waterworks Company commissioned their own report into the disaster which was written by five recent or future presidents of the ICE: James Simpson, Thomas Hawksley, John Frederick Bateman, John Fowler and Thomas Elliot Harrison.

As for the physical damage in Sheffield and all the nearby areas hit in this short space of time, 238 people died and some 700 animals were drowned; 130 buildings were destroyed and 500 partially damaged; 15 bridges were swept away and six others badly damaged.

The claims for damages formed one of the largest insurance claims of the Victorian period.

St. Nicholas Church in Bradfield has a plaque commemorating the flood.

== Rebuilding ==
The collapse of the Dale Dyke Dam led to reforms in engineering practice.

This then set standards on specifics that needed to be met when constructing such large-scale structures as the Dale Dyke Dam. As for John Gunson, most of the blame fell on him. The government passed the Sheffield Waterworks Act 1864 (27 & 28 Vict. c. cccxxiv) to form a Board of Inundation Commissioners. A flood memorial stone marks the site of the original dam wall and footpaths to explore the area.

== 150th anniversary ==
March 2014 saw the 150th anniversary of the disaster. Events took place to commemorate the occasion, including an illustrated talk and exhibition at Low Bradfield Village Hall, guided walks to the dam, memorial services at Bradfield Church and St Polycarp's, Malin Bridge, and a public talk at the University of Sheffield by the Institution of Civil Engineers and the British Dam Society. A commemorative tankard and plate were produced by the Bradfield Historical Society, and the Bradfield Brewery produced a special "flood beer" known as Dam It. The duo Toffee Music recorded a CD of Great Sheffield Flood songs.

== See also ==
- Floods in Sheffield 2007
- Great Sheffield Gale, a lesser known disaster which devastated the city 98 years later
- List of disasters in Great Britain and Ireland by death toll
- List of deadliest floods
