= HM Prison Send =

Women's prison in Surrey, England

Coordinates: 51°16′23″N 0°29′26″W

HMP Send
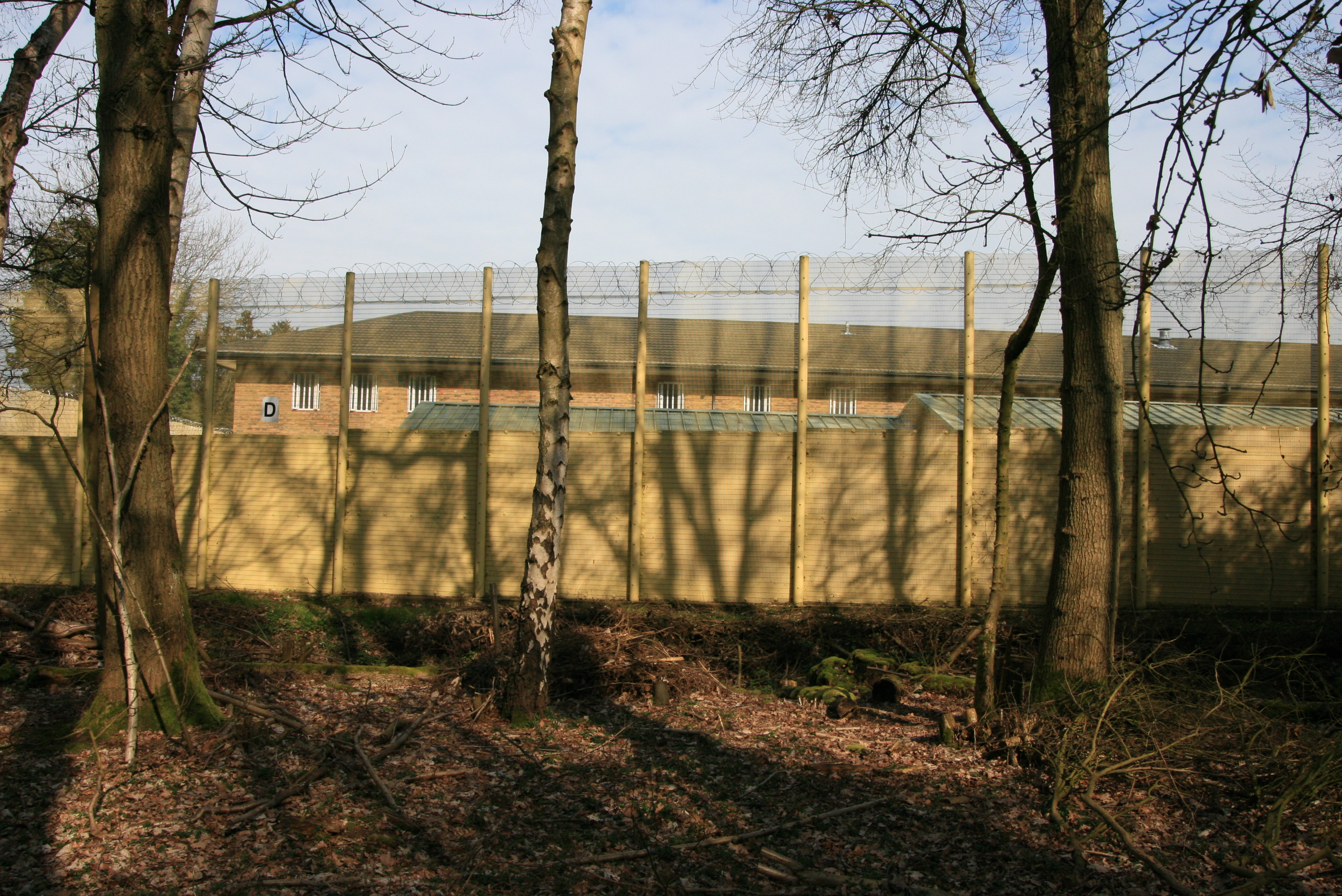
- Perimeter fence and 'D' Block
- Interactive map of HMP Send
- Location: Ripley, Surrey
- Security class: Adult Female/Closed Category
- Population: 282 (May 2009)
- Opened: 1962
- Managed by: HM Prison Services
- Governor: Esther Dainton
- Website: Send at justice.gov.uk

HM Prison Send is a closed category women's prison in the extreme south of Ripley civil parish in Surrey, England. The nearest settlements are Send and West Clandon. The prison is operated by His Majesty's Prison Service.

== History ==
HM Prison Send was formerly the site of a smallpox isolation hospital which closed in 1952. In 1962, it opened as a Junior Detention Centre. It remained as such until 1986 when it was re-classified as a Category C Adult Male Training Prison. In 1998, it became a women's prison, and was demolished and rebuilt the following year.

In August 2005, a report by the Independent Monitoring Board criticised a marked increase in self-harm and suicide amongst inmates and lack of staff, whereas it praised the prison's education provision and its farms and gardens scheme.

== The prison today ==
Send is a closed prison for adult females. It houses an 80-bed Resettlement Unit, a 40-bed Therapeutic Community, a 20-bed Progression Psychologically Informed Planned Environment (PIPE) and a 20-bed Preparation PIPE.

HMP Send's Education Department runs Key Skills courses and NVQs in Business Administration. The Farms and Gardens department offers Floristry NVQs, and the Works Department run an industrial workshop and painting party. Prisoners held in the Resettlement Unit can also do voluntary work, attend College courses and Work Placements in the outside community.

== Notable inmates ==
=== Current ===
- Louise Lancaster – climate change activist

=== Former ===
- Jane Andrews - Convicted in 2001 of murdering her lover, Thomas Cressman in 2000.
- Farah Damji - Convicted of multiple crimes, including fraud and stalking.
- Vanessa George - Convicted in connection with the 2009 Plymouth child abuse case.
- Mairead Philpott - Convicted in 2013 of manslaughter alongside her husband, Mick Philpott in relation to the 2012 Derby arson attack.
- Dena Thompson - Convicted in 2003 for murdering her husband, Julian Webb in 1994. She has also held previous convictions for fraud.
