= Kim Hill =

Kim Hill may refer to:

- Kim Hill (broadcaster) (born 1955), English-born New Zealand broadcaster
- Kim Hill (Christian singer) (born 1963), American Christian country singer-songwriter
- Kim Hill (soul singer) (born 1972), American soul vocalist, formerly of the Black Eyed Peas
- Kim Hill, victim in 1978 of attempted murder by Mick Philpott
- Kim Hill (1966–2011), daughter of American football player Fred Hill and the inspiration for the Ronald McDonald House charity

== See also ==
- Kimberly Hill (born 1989), American volleyball player
- Kimberly Hill (Arrowverse), fictional Arrowverse character
