= Cave Dale =

Limestone valley in Peak District, UK

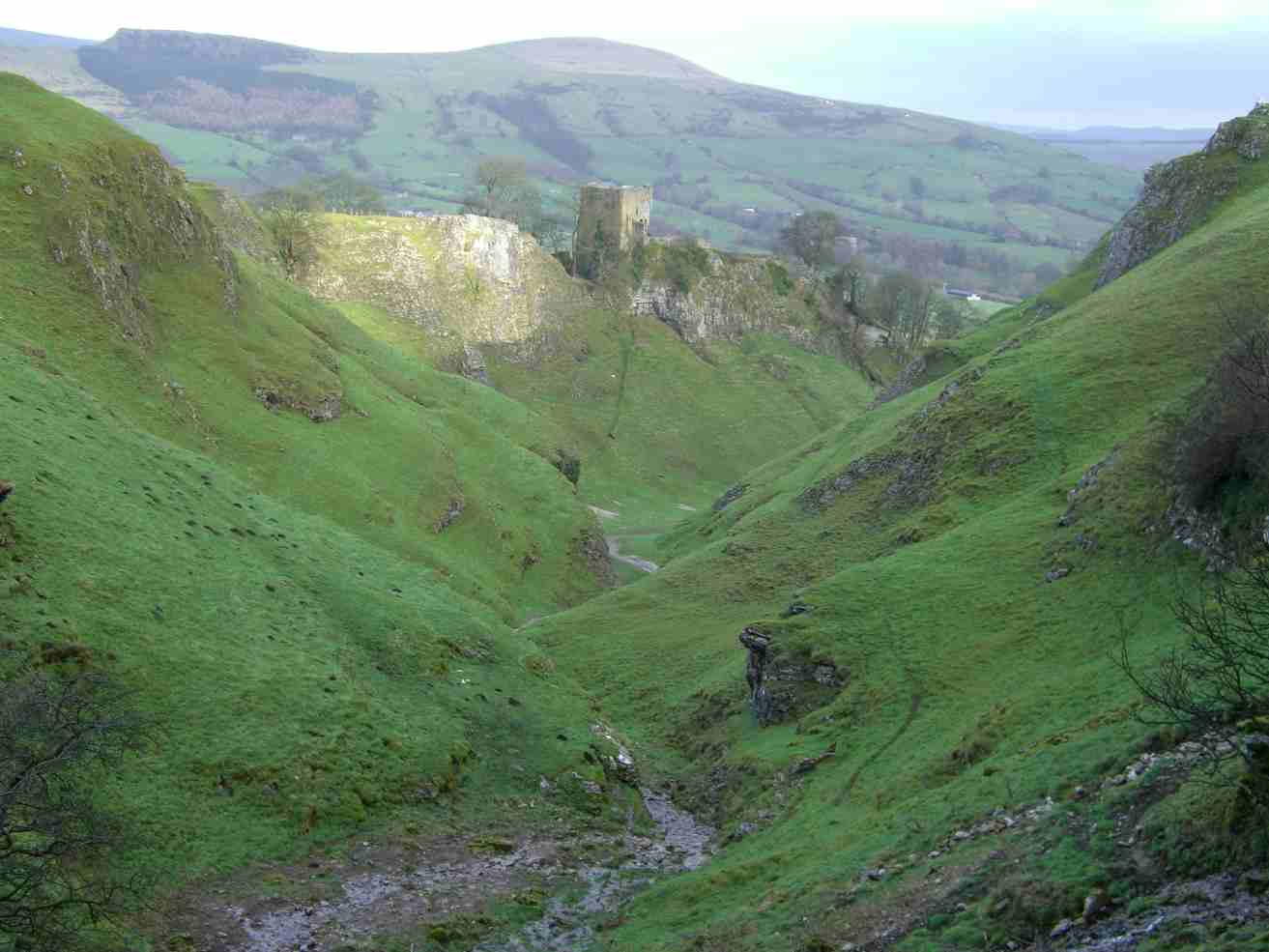
- The view from the top of the steep section

- Location within Derbyshire
- Length: c.1.2 kilometres (0.75 mi)

Geography
- Location: Castleton, Derbyshire
- Country: England
- Coordinates: 53.3386°N 1.7777°W
- Interactive map of Cave Dale

Cave Dale (sometimes spelt Cavedale) is a dry limestone valley in the Derbyshire Peak District, England. It is located at grid reference SK149824. The northern end of the dale starts at the village of Castleton where the valley sides are almost perpendicular and over 50 metres (160 ft) in height. The dale rises gently after leaving Castleton for approximately 200 metres (220 yd) before becoming steeper culminating in a fine viewpoint down the dale taking in Peveril Castle with Lose Hill behind (see picture). After the viewpoint the dale swings west and levels out with gentle gradients, becoming just a shallow depression as it peters out onto the open pastureland between Castleton and Chapel-en-le-Frith.

Cave Dale was initially formed by glacial meltwater carving a deep narrow valley in the local soluble limestone. The river then found a route underground leaving a dry valley with caverns underneath. Later on the caverns below Cave Dale collapsed making the valley even deeper and gorge-like at the northern end. The Castleton entrance to Cave Dale had a narrow natural arch as recently as 200 years ago, a relic of the roof collapse. The lower slopes of the dale have large amounts of scree, frost on the higher limestone cliffs having caused the rock to shatter. Halfway up the valley is an outcrop of basaltic lava with a few small and heavily-weathered, but clearly hexagonal columns. Although relatively thin, the impervious lava bed forms a hydrological barrier to percolation water, creating an 'umbrella' effect in Peak Cavern below, and thus preventing speleothem production beneath the bed. Two natural springs or 'risings' emerge from either side of the footpath here for the same reason, and the combined flow runs down the floor of the valley for a while before sinking again.

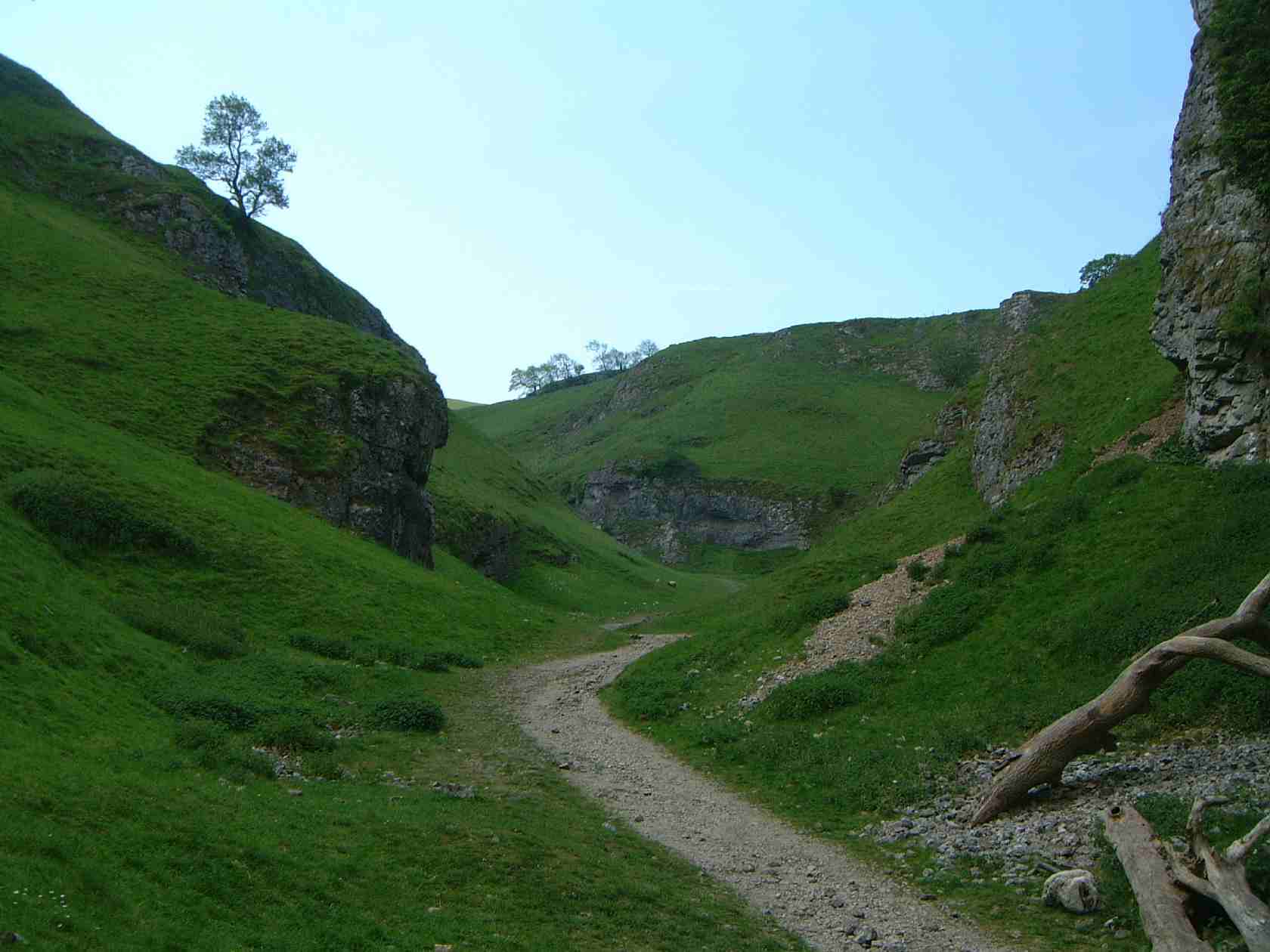
The northern part of Cave Dale near Castleton

A bridleway runs the entire length of the dale, part of the Limestone Way footpath which travels 80 kilometres from Castleton to Rocester in Staffordshire. Cave Dale is accessed through a narrow rocky opening almost from the centre of Castleton, and Peveril Castle is seen high up on the almost vertical western slopes. The Normans chose this site because the steep sides of Cave Dale gave a natural defence and good lookout.

The chambers and caves of Peak Cavern run directly below Cave Dale and any small streams in the dale quickly disappear into the ground down limestone fissures and into the caverns beneath. Mineral veins can also be seen within the limestone of the dale. The cliffs at the northern end of Cave Dale are used by rock climbers and there are several routes in the Very Severe category. There are several small caves or old lead mines within the dale's limestone walls, one being larger than the rest with bars preventing access, as it is the ventilation fan outlet for Peak Cavern. Cave Dale's steep north-facing grassy slopes are damp and bryophyte-rich and are dominated by oat grass (Trisetum flavescent) and sheep's fescue (Festuca ovina). Lesser meadow-rue (Thalictrum minus) grows extensively on ledges in the dale.

At the southwestern extremity of the dale as it merges into the moorland between Castleton and Peak Forest are the remains of several old lead mines. The Hazard Mine lies at grid reference SK136812, and was one of the major mines of the area. Over 5000 tonnes of lead ore were mined and the workings once went down to 700 feet (210 m), though the main shaft is now only 80m deep after internal collapses. The Hollandtwine Mine lies 250 metres (820 ft) to the east but the shaft top was destroyed and buried during fluorspar quarrying in the 1990s, and access is no longer possible. Drainage from both mines went directly into Peak Cavern.

In 1983 Cave Dale was the scene of the murder of a 21-year-old Manchester Polytechnic student, Susan Renhard. Norman Smith, a local 17-year-old, was subsequently jailed for life at Nottingham Crown Court in 1984.

Cave Dale features in the films The Princess Bride (1987) and The Other Boleyn Girl (2008).
