= 2012 Derby arson attack =

2012 crime in England

Coordinates: 52°53′43″N 1°28′14″W

- Date: 11 May 2012
- Location: Derby, England
- Accused: Mick Philpott; Mairead Philpott; Paul Mosley
- Charges: Manslaughter
- Trial: 11 February – 2 April 2013
- Verdict: Guilty
- Convictions: Manslaughter
- Sentence: Life (Mick); 17 years (Maireid and Paul)

The 2012 Derby arson attack occurred on 11 May 2012 at 18 Victory Road, a semi-detached house (since demolished) in Allenton, Derby, Derbyshire, England. Five children died at the scene, while the oldest later died in hospital. The parents of the children, Mairead and Mick Philpott, along with their friend Paul Mosley, were later arrested and charged with murder. In December 2012 their charges were downgraded to manslaughter. On 2 April 2013, Mick Philpott and Paul Mosley were found guilty by unanimous verdicts, while Mairead Philpott was found guilty by majority verdict. Mick Philpott was sentenced to life imprisonment, while his wife and Mosley received 17-year sentences.

== Fire ==
The children were asleep upstairs in the house when the fire began, with their parents downstairs. Their father, Mick Philpott, was reported to have made "valiant" attempts to save them. Jade Philpott (10), John Philpott (9), Jack Philpott (7), Jesse Philpott (6) and Jayden Philpott (5) were all killed in the fire; post-mortem tests revealed the children died of smoke inhalation. Their half-brother, Duwayne Philpott (13) died in hospital two days later. Jade, John, Jack, and Jesse attended St George's Catholic Primary School, and Duwayne was a student at Saint Benedict Catholic School.

Police confirmed that the fire was started deliberately, with petrol underneath the letterbox, in an act of arson, stating that "Initial indications are that it was deliberately set and as a result six children have been unlawfully killed."

A church service was held in memory of the children at the Catholic church of St George's in Littleover. A charity, Catch Me When I Fall, was set up by residents to help the family of the children. A book of condolence at Derby Cathedral was later signed by hundreds of people.

== Arrests ==
A 38-year-old man and a 28-year-old woman were arrested on suspicion of murder but were later released without charge following questioning. Following the release of the pair Assistant Chief Constable Steve Cotterill said that "While I thank those members of the community who have come forward with information I am surprised by how few people have contacted us. Normally in cases of this scale, more information is passed to the police...I strongly suspect that there is someone out there in the community who knows more than we are being told."

The parents of the children, Mick and Mairead Philpott, were arrested on suspicion of murder on 29 May and charged with their murders the following day.

On 5 November 2012, a 49-year-old man and a 45-year-old man were arrested on suspicion of murder. Later that day, the 45-year-old man, Paul Mosley, was charged with murder. The other man was released without charge. Mosley appeared in court the following day. In December 2012 his charge was downgraded to manslaughter. Paul Mosley had previously been arrested in the inquiry and was released on bail in June 2012. He was re-arrested and charged when petrol was found on his clothing following further forensic examination.

== Trial ==
The criminal trial began on 12 February 2013 at Nottingham Crown Court before judge Kathryn Thirlwall. Richard Latham QC led the prosecution on behalf of the Crown Prosecution Service. Anthony Orchard QC led the defence for Mick Philpott, Sean Smith QC led the defence for Mairead Philpott, and Benjamin Nolan QC led the defence for Mosley. On 2 April, Mick and Mairead Philpott, along with Paul Mosley, were each found guilty of the manslaughter of the six children. On 4 April, Philpott received a sentence of life imprisonment, and will serve a minimum of 15 years, while his wife and Mosley received 17 years imprisonment for their part.

== Aftermath ==
On 30 September 2013, the Philpott house was demolished with the roof being demolished first. Although plans for a garden were proposed, they were rejected. Today, a social housing block occupies the site of the fire.

Mick Philpott is imprisoned in HMP Wakefield and will be eligible for parole in 2028. Mairead was released from prison in 2020 and Mosley in 2023.

On 6 October 2025, a family member of Mosley announced that he had died of a heart attack.

== See also ==
- Killamarsh killings (2021)
- Shiregreen child murders (2019)
- Ughill Hall shootings (1986)
