= Ughill =

Hamlet in South Yorkshire, England

Coordinates: 53.410242°N 1.611782°W

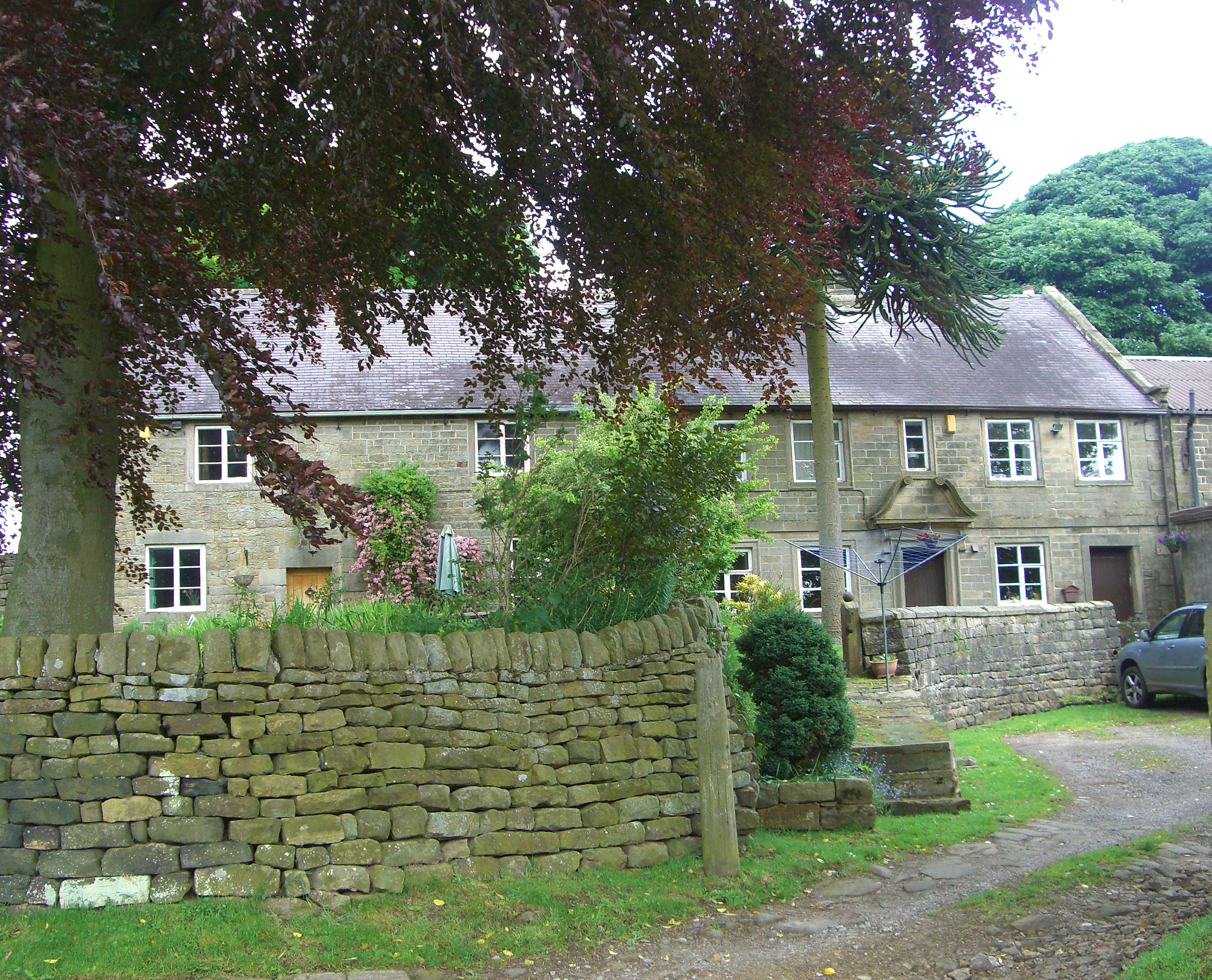
Ughill Manor

Ughill is a small, rural hamlet within the City of Sheffield in Bradfield Parish in England. It is 5 mi (8 km) west-northwest of the city centre. It stands in a lofty position at 918 ft (280 m) above sea level, on a ridge between Bradfield Dale and the valley of the Ughill Brook. It has traditionally been a farming community, but there was some mining in the area in the late 19th and 20th century. Ughill Hall was the scene of an infamous murder in September 1986. The hamlet falls within the Stannington ward of the City.

== History ==
Ughill is thought to have been founded in the 10th century by a group of Norwegian Vikings with the name deriving from the Old Norse language as Uhgil meaning Uha's Valley or Uggagil meaning Uggi's Valley. In the Old Norse language, gil is a steep-sided valley. Ughill was one of six small estates in Hallamshire named in the Domesday Book of 1086, these included the nearby settlements of Holdworth, Worrall and Onesacre. Just prior to the Norman conquest of England Ughill had developed into an Anglo-Saxon farming holding under the control of Healfdene or Aldene who was Lord of approximately 50 settlements, mainly across Yorkshire, Lincolnshire and Suffolk. After the Conquest ownership of Ughill was taken over by Roger de Busli who was given large swathes of land across Nottinghamshire and Yorkshire for his part in the Conquest. In the Domesday Book Ughill had a taxable value of 1.8 geld units with two plough lands and one league of woodland.

Ughill was mentioned in documents in the late 13th century when the Lord of Hallamshire Thomas de Furnival granted local herbage rights to Ellys and all men of Ughill. Around 1290, the first mention of the Ughil family was recorded in the manor when John the son of John de Ughil was mentioned in a deed, Adam de Ughil and Roger de Ughil were mentioned at a later date, so the surname had become hereditary but it did not survive. By the 15th century, the Marriott family had settled in Ughill, they were another Norman family who rose from modest beginnings to become minor gentry throughout Hallamshire. John Marriott took over a farm in the low-lying part of Ughill in 1442 and was succeeded at the farm by several generations of John Marriotts up to the 17th century. Thomas Marriott (1679–1754) became Lord of the Manor in the early part of the 18th century, where he was styled Mr Marrott of Ughill Hall. Marriott was a Dissenter who in 1743 built Underbank Chapel, four km to the east at Stannington. Thomas was succeeded by his brother Benjamin but the male lineage then failed, ending the Marriotts family’s connection with Ughill after 300 years.

== Buildings ==
=== Ughill Manor ===
Ughill Manor is a farmhouse which dates from the early 18th century, however buildings have existed on the site from a much earlier date with timbers from the adjoining cruck barn being dated to 1504. Ughill Manor and its barn and cow house are Grade II listed buildings.

=== Ughill Hall ===
Ughill Hall is a substantial stone residence which has been much altered over the years; it existed in a form much different from the present-day building in the reign of Edward the Confessor (1042–1066). For many years it was the home of the Marriotts. In more recent times the hall was owned by Charles Vickers who used it as a summer shooting lodge and then by Mr. Lomas, the owner of some of the mines in the surrounding area. The adjacent Ughill Hall farm is still a working farm.

==== Ughill Hall shootings ====
The Ughill Hall shootings occurred on 21 September 1986 at Ughill Hall in Bradfield near Sheffield. Ian Wood shot and killed his mistress Danielle Ledez and her daughter Stephanie and severely injured Christopher, Ledez's elder child. He went on the run for eight days when he surrendered to authorities in France after threatening to commit suicide by jumping off Amiens Cathedral. Wood was later convicted of double murder, attempted murder and theft.

=== Upper House ===
A plaque on the building states that Upper House was the home of the Worrall family from 1540 to 1988 and that the family had lived in Ughill for in excess of 700 years over 25 generations.

Other buildings in Ughill include Platts Farm, Nether House, Manor Farm Cottage and Cherry Tree Cottage.

== Mining ==
The fire brick company Thomas Wragg & Sons owned a Pot Clay mine immediately to the south east of the hamlet. Pot Clay is a very mouldable type of fireclay long used in the past to make crucibles for the local Sheffield steel industry. It is found in beds together with beds of Ganister throughout the area and from about 1860 was in demand to make casting pit (pouring pit) and ladle control refractory bricks for the growing Sheffield steel industry following the introduction of Bessemer converters. In the early 1970s the mine was producing 15,000 tons of clay per year, with the company quoting, “The mine can be worked at the present rate for 100 years”. A refractory brick works stood at the entrance to the mine. However the Ughill mine had drainage problems and although powerful pumps had been installed in the 1950s to pump between 600 and 800 gallons per minute from the mine, the mine closed on 17 November 1977. It had become uneconomic to mine the clay due to water problems and the owners found it more profitable to bring in clay from the Midlands. The site of the mine has been landscaped and returned to agricultural use. J&J Dyson mined fireclay at their open cast quarry at Wheatshire between Ughill and Sugworth. The quarry is closed but can still be seen from the nearby road. Thos. Wragg had small firebrick works at Load Brook (closed 1957) and Brookside (Stopes Road, Stannington, closed 1960) the former previously owned by the Trickett family, the latter by the Drabble family and a major works (Storrs Fire Clay Works) in the nearby Loxley Valley. Wraggs along with its local competitors, J&J Dyson of Griffs Works, Stannington and Thos. Marshall of Storrs Bridge Fire Brick Works, Loxley, mined the Stannington Pot Clay seam and manufactured fireclay-based casting pit holloware refractories for use in steel making worldwide. All three plants closed following a collapse in demand for casting pit refractories of the type made locally mainly because of the introduction of continuous casting of steel worldwide and the general demise of the British steel industry.
