= Holdworth =

Hamlet in South Yorkshire, England

Coordinates: 53.420313°N 1.569479°W

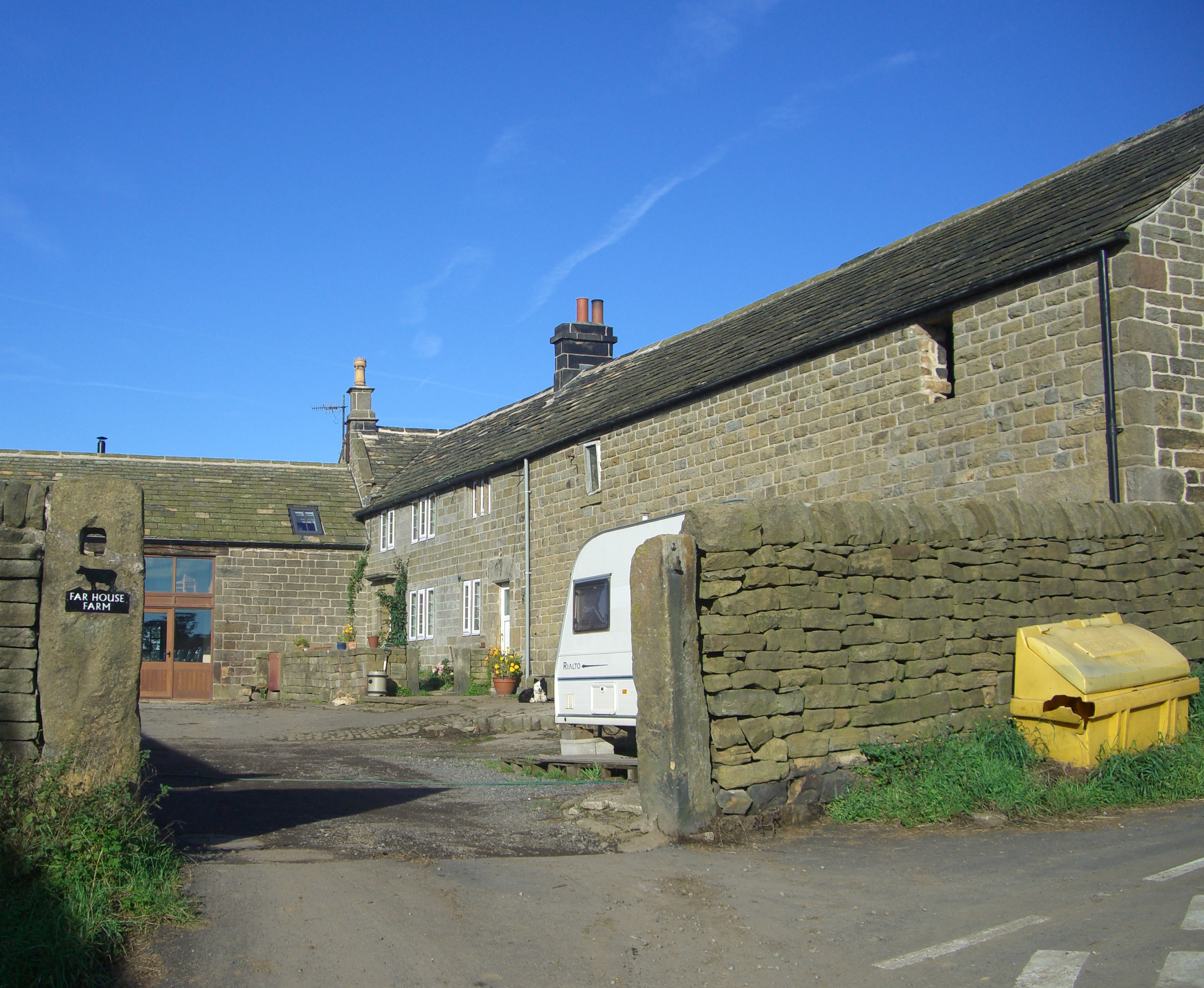
Far House Farm, the oldest building in Holdworth.

Holdworth is a small rural hamlet situated within the boundary of the City of Sheffield, England. It is located 4.7 miles (7.5 km) northwest of the city centre at an altitude of 280 metres above sea level, giving it extensive views south over the upper Loxley valley. The hamlet falls within the Stannington ward of the City. It is an ancient farming settlement which was mentioned in the Domesday Book of 1086.

== History ==
Prior to the Norman conquest of England, Holdworth was a small Ango-Saxon farming community. Settlements which end in "worth" signify a farmstead that is thought to have Mercian origins with "Hold" being an Old English personal name. It was located in the Strafforth wapentake and was owned by the Saxon Lord Healfdene or Aldene, who also held land in the nearby settlements of Wadsley, Worrall and Ughill. After the Conquest, ownership of Holdworth passed to Roger de Busli (Roger of Bully) who had been given extensive lands by William the Conqueror across Nottinghamshire and Yorkshire for his part in the Conquest. The Domesday Book states that in 1086 Holdworth consisted of one ploughland with some woodland with a taxable value of two geld units.

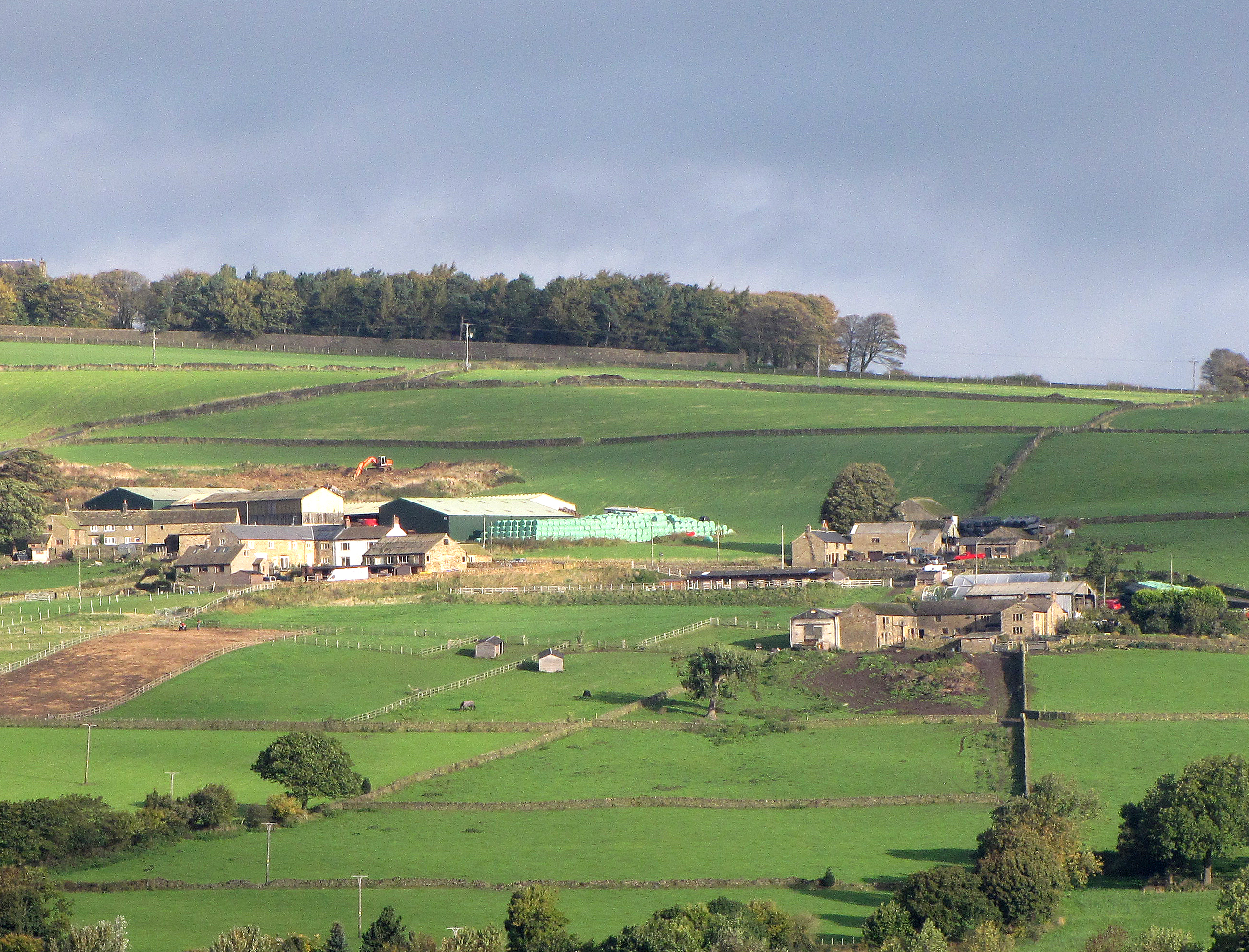
Holdworth seen across the Loxley valley. The farm buildings of White House, Far House, Trickett Edge and Green End can be seen.

Between 1270 and 1314, the name of Thomas de Haldeworth was recorded in the area on three occasions. In 1393 John Smallbeehind acquired eleven and a half acres of land in Holdworth, he built this up to a farm holding which was to remain in the family name until the middle of the sixteenth century. The Moorwood family rose from humble beginnings in the 13th century to become one of Hallamshire’s aristocracy 400 years later, it is recorded that they held land at Holdworth in 1411 through John de Moorwood. Another eminent Hallamshire family with connections to Holdworth were the Steads, Thomas Stead, the builder of Hillsborough House, held an estate of over 2,000 acres on his death in 1793, including land at Holdworth.

== Present day ==
The oldest building in present-day Holdworth is Far House Farm, the farmhouse and attached cow house dates from the late 17th century and is a Grade II listed building. Other buildings in the hamlet include Green End Farm, Heather Bank, Trickett Edge Farm, White House Bungalow and Holdworth Hall.

=== Low Holdworth ===
Low Holdworth is situated just under a kilometre to the south of the main farming hamlet. It stands at a lower altitude on the B6077 road (Loxley Road) and includes the Grade II listed Holdworth Cottage which dates from 1752.
