= Killamarsh murders =

2021 mass murder in England

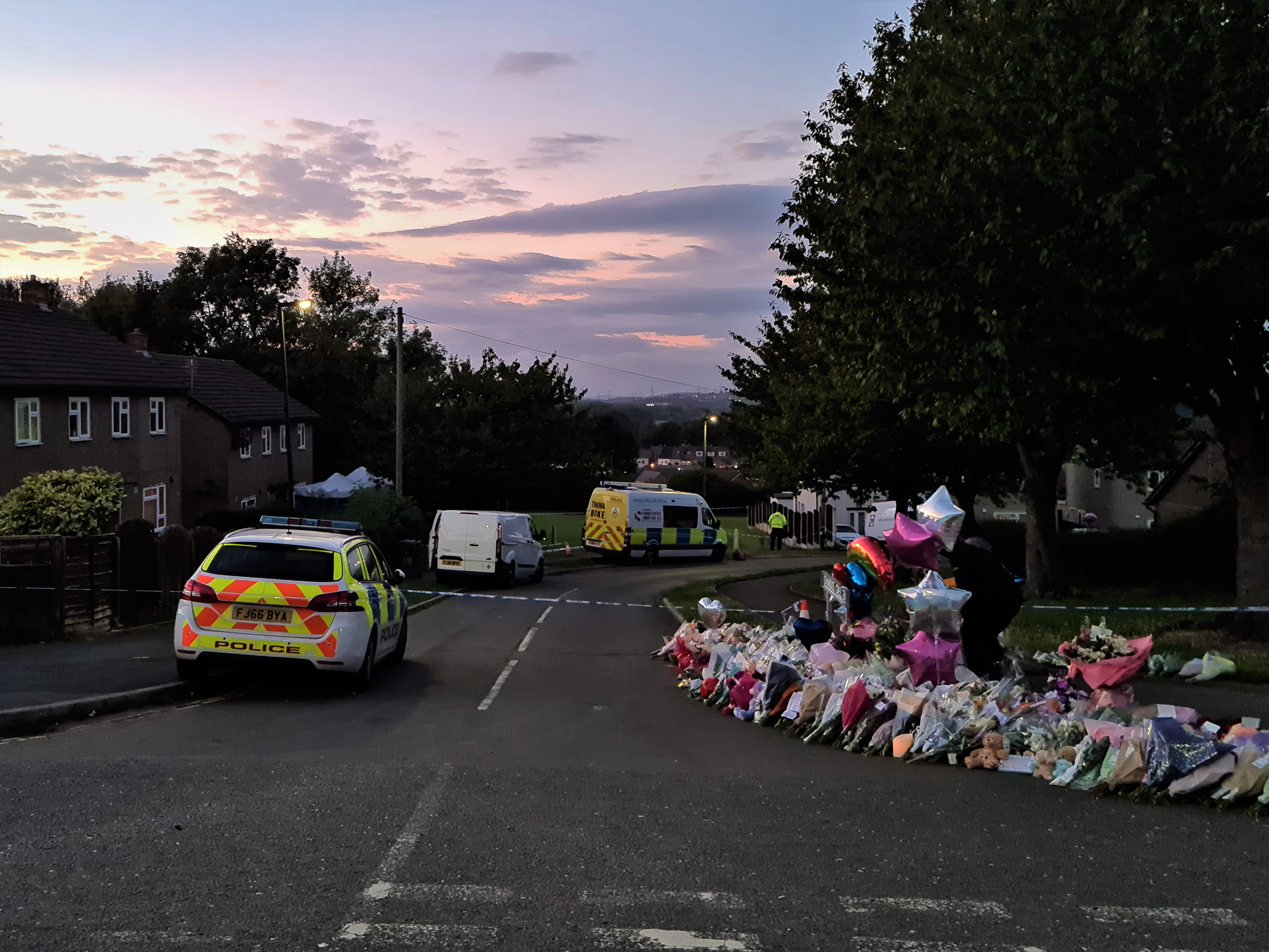
- Tributes left at the police cordon on Chandos Crescent four days after the murders

- Killamarsh murders (Sheffield) Killamarsh murders (the East Midlands) Killamarsh murders (the United Kingdom)
- Location: 53.321862°N 1.318482°W; Chandos Crescent; Killamarsh, Derbyshire, a village in North East Derbyshire
- Date: 18 September 2021
- Attack type: Mass murder, rape
- Deaths: 4
- Injuries: 1 (the perpetrator)
- Victims: John Paul Bennett (age 13); Lacey Bennett (age 11); Connie Gent (age 11); Terri Harris (age 35)
- Perpetrator: Damien Bendall
- Motive: Unknown
- Verdict: Pleaded guilty
- Convictions: Murder (4 counts); Rape of a child
- Judge: Mr Justice Sweeney

In the evening of 18 September 2021, Damien Bendall murdered his partner Terri Harris, her two children Lacey and John-Paul Bennet, as well as Lacey's friend Connie Gent at a residential property on Chandos Crescent in Killamarsh, Derbyshire, an outer suburb of Sheffield, South Yorkshire. After being arrested the next morning, Bendall was charged with four counts of murder and later rape of a girl under 13 in connection with the incident. He pleaded guilty to all charges and was sentenced to a whole-life prison term on 21 December 2022.

== Overview ==
=== Crime details ===
Based on phone evidence, it is estimated that the murder spree had occurred shortly after 21:42 on 18 September 2021. According to prosecutors, at that time, the children were preparing to go to bed while Bendall was trying to contact his drug dealer for cocaine.

Bendall had killed his pregnant partner Terri Harris, her children Lacey and John-Paul Bennett, as well as Lacey's friend Connie Gent, who was staying there for a sleepover, by striking them with a claw hammer over their heads. He had also raped Lacey as she was dying from her head injuries.

After committing the murders, Bendall raped Lacey again and then ordered a taxi, and went to Sheffield to exchange John's Xbox for drugs.

=== Bendall's arrest ===
Police officers from Derbyshire Constabulary attended reports of a disturbance at a residential property, 56 Chandos Crescent, close to Killamarsh town centre, at 07:26 on 19 September 2021. Bendall had also called 999, saying that he would need police and ambulance because he had killed four people.

Arriving at the property at 07:39, officers found Bendall outside, with self-inflicted stab wounds on his chest and stomach from a bread knife. Bendall told the officers he knew he would "be going to prison again", and when asked what he had done, calmly responded with "I've murdered four people." The officers then entered the property where they located the remains of the victims. Subsequently, Bendall was arrested under the suspicion of murder.

=== Legal proceedings ===
On 22 September 2021, Bendall was charged with four counts of murder and later rape of a girl under 13 in connection with the incident.

Bendall admitted all charges and was sentenced by Mr Justice Sweeney to a whole-life prison term on 21 December 2022.

== Aftermath ==
=== Vigil ===
On 20 September 2021, members of the community held a vigil in honour of the victims. Around 300 people attended including family members of the victims.

=== Evaluation of probationary practices ===
Due to the fact that Bendall was on probation when he committed the murders, the HM Inspectorate of Probation conducted a Serious Further Offense review into the way the National Probational Service managed Bendall. Both it and a separate coroner's report expressed concerns about the lack of child safeguarding and domestic abuse checks conducted by the Probational Service in this case and inexperienced staff within the Probational Service among other issues. However it must be noted that Bendall was on probation due to an unrelated incident of arson. Information failed to be provided to the reviewing officers by senior staff, which clearly indicated the serious danger that Bendall posed to the public.

=== Demolition ===
On 21 July 2023, the property where the murders took place was demolished, along with the property next door, on the orders of North East Derbyshire District Council. This was preceded by consultations of the council with local community members, residents of the area, and relatives of the victims.

== See also ==
- Shiregreen child murders (2019)
- Derby arson attack (2012)
- Sheffield incest case (2008)
- Ughill Hall shootings (1986)
- List of prisoners with whole life orders
