= Shiregreen child murders =

2019 crime in England

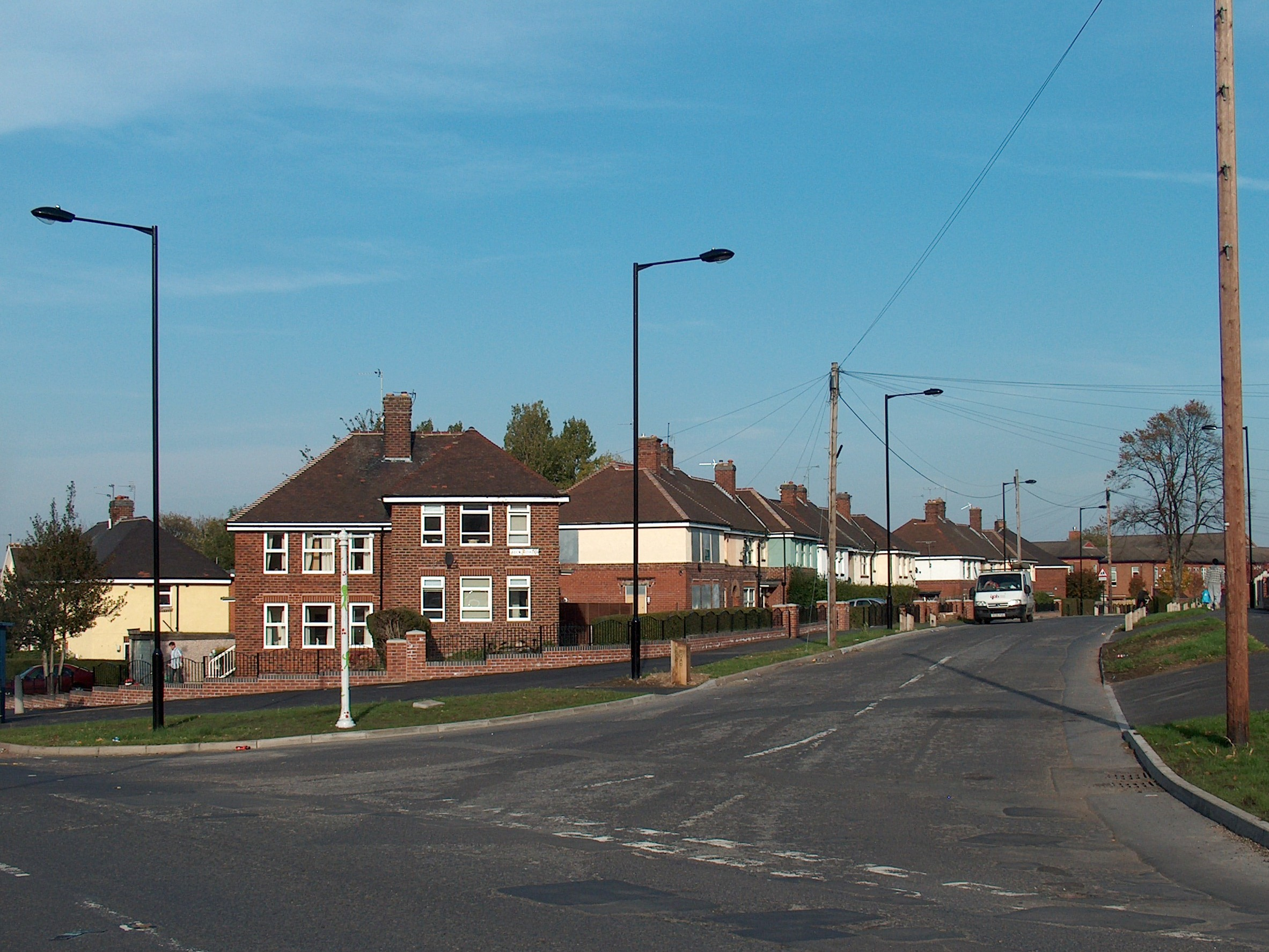
- A residential street in Shiregreen, 2011

- Shiregreen child murders (Sheffield) Shiregreen child murders (Yorkshire and the Humber) Shiregreen child murders (the United Kingdom)
- Location: 53.428057°N 1.449177°W; Gregg House Road; Shiregreen, Sheffield
- Date: ~07:30 BST (UTC+1); 24 May 2019
- Attack type: Murders and attempted murders
- Deaths: 2
- Injuries: 4
- Victims: Blake Barrass (14y, deceased), Tristan Barrass (13y, deceased), four siblings (survived)
- Perpetrators: Sarah Barrass, Brandon Machin
- Verdict: Pleaded guilty
- Convictions: Both sentenced to life imprisonment, with a minimum of 35 years

At around 07:30 BST on 24 May 2019, police officers were called to a residential property on Gregg House Road in Shiregreen, a northern suburb of Sheffield, South Yorkshire, following reports concerning the welfare of children. Six children were found unconscious inside the property; they were treated at the Sheffield Children's Hospital, where the two oldest children later died. Two people, Brandon Machin, a 38- or 39-year-old man (Note: His age at sentencing was 39. Some early reports gave his age at arrest as 37.) and Sarah Barrass, the 34-year-old mother of the children, were arrested at the property on suspicion of murder.

== Incident ==
Police officers from the South Yorkshire Police attended a residential property on Gregg House Road, close to Hartley Brook Primary Academy in the Shiregreen district of northern Sheffield, at around 07:30 am on 24 May 2019. The police had received reports of concerns for the safety of a number of children inside the property from neighbours, and initiated a large scale response to the incident. Fifteen police cars arrived to raid the property, during which the police located six children—aged 7 months and 3, 10, 11, 13 and 14 years—unconscious inside the property. Officers arrested two people, a 37-year-old man and a 34-year-old woman, on suspicion of murder.

The area surrounding Gregg House Road was placed under lockdown, including Hartley Brook Primary Academy, whose playground was used for the landing of the Yorkshire Air Ambulance at the scene after the police raid. Four road ambulances also attended the scene; all six children were transported to the Sheffield Children's Hospital for treatment. The eldest two children, aged 13 and 14, subsequently died in hospital. The four remaining children were reported to be conscious and in a non-life threatening condition, although they will remain hospitalised for "certainly the next few hours". Police later narrowed down the cordon to the affected street and confirmed they were not looking for other suspects in connection with the "isolated" incident, with no wider risk to the community.

== Response ==
In the immediate aftermath of the incident, there was widespread speculation on social media, before information began to emerge. Particularly, there were reports that a mass shooting had occurred in Shiregreen: Hartley Brook Primary Academy was implicated in some such reports, as the school was located within the lockdown cordon and was used as a landing site for the Yorkshire Air Ambulance. A press release by South Yorkshire Police later ruled out a shooting, confirming that no shots had been fired and there had not been an incident at the school.

The children who died were students at Firth Park Academy. The school issued a statement following the confirmation of fatalities, saying that the incident came as "a huge shock to everyone". The Academy subsequently offered support for students and staff affected by the incident. Gill Furniss, the Labour Member of Parliament for Sheffield Brightside and Hillsborough constituency within which the incident occurred, said in a statement that she was "deeply saddened by the tragic incident", describing Shiregreen as a "strong community" and thanking the emergency services for their efforts.

== Investigation ==
A murder investigation was launched shortly after the initial police raid concluded, with forensic examination of the property and surrounding areas. Barrass and Machin were arrested and charged with multiple counts of murder and attempted murder. The property where the incident occurred was a semi-detached council house. The garden was described as "unkempt".

On 27 September 2019, Sarah Barrass, 35, and Brandon Machin, 39, both pled guilty to the two murders, conspiracy to murder all six children, and five counts (Note: The five counts were against four children, the initial poisoning and the later drowning early on the next day were both counted as separate attempts.) of attempted murder. Barrass pled guilty to five counts of attempted murder against her four surviving children, this anomaly was due to the first attempts being on 23 May, and a further attempt against one child on 24 May. Sentencing was set for 12 November.

== Sentencing ==
At the sentencing hearing on 12 November, further information was revealed. This information had previously been subject to a reporting ban, lifted at the sentencing hearing. Barrass and Machin were half-siblings and had been in an incestuous relationship for some time, Machin spending days at the house but maintaining his own home in Burngreave, a few miles away. A note by Barrass made on her phone at the time of the crimes said "Brandon is the dad to all the kids...". The children had previously believed that their father was dead.

In November 2018, an allegation of sexual assault towards another child had been made about Blake, the 14 year old victim, and social services became involved. He had also been diagnosed with ADHD two years earlier. A similar allegation was later made about Tristan, the 13 year old victim, in May, shortly before the deaths. Messages from Barrass were shown which indicated her concern of the children being taken into foster care as a result, "I love my kids too much to kill 'em, I can't put 'em into care for the same reasons."

A social services meeting on 22 May, from which Barrass was excluded, seems to have been a crisis point. After this, she was told that the children's status was raised from 'child in need' to the more actively involved 'child in protection'. Social services were unaware of the children's father and made inquiries into this, and performed the usual screening for any possibility of sexual abuse within the home. The final trigger may have been a phone call to Barrass on the evening of 23 May, when an unnamed local individual complained of a further sexual assault by Tristan against a child, and that they would be reporting the matter to social services. On arrest, Barrass made the statements to police that she would, "rather see them [her children] dead than in care," and "I gave them life and I can take it away". As usual after a case involving such deaths, social services performed a Serious Case Review. The review report was published in August 2020, and found that the murders could not have been predicted.

=== Murders ===
Barrass and Machin acted together. They first attempted to poison the four oldest children using prescribed ADHD medication. When this was ineffective, they proceeded to strangle the two older boys. Barrass using a dressing gown cord to strangle Tristan and Machin strangling Blake with his hands, both to unconsciousness and then suffocating them with plastic bags over their heads. They then made an unsuccessful attempt to drown another child in the bath. Barrass texted a friend just after 7:00 am alleging that Machin was trying to kill her and admitting the deaths, "He's trying to kill us and Tristan and Blake are already dead", and both of them then called the police.

=== Sentence ===
On 12 November 2019, both Barrass and Machin were sentenced to life for murder, with a minimum of 35 years in prison.

== Memorial ==
The murders occurred at 92 Gregg House Road, an end terrace residential property owned by Sanctuary Housing. It remained unoccupied in the aftermath of the murders and the arrest and trial of Barrass and Machin. Following their sentencing, Sanctuary Housing applied for planning permission to demolish the house and construct a memorial in its place. The proposals gained the support of the surviving members of the Barrass family as well as the wider local community in Shiregreen. Planning permission was granted for the project in July 2020. According to the planning application, the memorial would consist of a small greenspace on the former site of the house, with a memorial tree in the centre. The house was demolished on 17 February 2021.

== See also ==
- Killamarsh killings (2021)
- Derby arson attack (2012)
- Sheffield incest case (2008)
- Ughill Hall shootings (1986)
- Louise Porton – British mother who killed her two children in 2018
