= Susan Renhard =

British murder victim (1961–1983)

Susan Elizabeth Renhard (17 November 1961 – 27 June 1983) was a student murdered in Cave Dale near Castleton, Derbyshire in 1983. Norman Hugh Morrison Smith, a young student, admitted to her sexual assault but denied strangling her. He was found guilty of murder on 24 February 1984.

== Background ==
Susan Renhard was born in Birmingham in the United Kingdom and brought up in the small village of Hagley, on the outskirts of Stourbridge. In 1983, Susan was engaged to be married to Bob Wood, another 21-year-old student from Sunderland, and was living in a flat in Heaton Moor, Stockport, whilst she completed her studies in Graphic Art at Manchester Polytechnic.

As part of her studies, she had to carry out a photographic project and thought the nearby Peak District would be a suitable choice. Although she had already completed her photo project (which included a slideshow and taped documentary), she was dissatisfied with the initial results, and she decided that some of the photographs needed retaking. Her father later recalled: "Susan has always been very thorough about everything she does—a real perfectionist." As part of her itinerary, Susan intended to spend a whole day in Castleton, one of the District's most popular tourist destinations, where she could then photograph its famous dales, caves and ruined Norman castle.

== Murder ==
Although her visit was brief, Susan nevertheless booked a room at the Lose Hill Study Centre in Castleton where, on 27 June 1983, she left alone in order to take some pictures. It was a bright, sunny day and, being a Monday, there was a lull in the normal crush of visitors to the area. Towards the beginning of the afternoon Susan was seen by two members of the public walking alone towards a famous beauty spot called Cave Dale. The route to Cave Dale runs from the centre of Castleton, past the ruined Peveril Castle and out onto the moors.

The last confirmed sighting of Susan was at 2:50 pm, and nothing more was seen of her until two members of the public discovered a red-haired body on the path at Cave Dale at 3:25 pm. The scene of the murder was at a point after the path along Cave Dale ascends a hillside. This is only five minutes' walk from where the valley path disappears from view when looking across from the battlements of Peveril Castle. Susan's lower clothing had been removed and her hands had been loosely tied with her camera strap. Her face and head had been hooded by her cagoule, and her jeans had then been draped over the lower part of her body in an apparent effort to make her look decent. A day after her death, police officially confirmed Susan's identity to the national press.

== Police investigation ==
The murder shocked the inhabitants of Castleton, and there was an immediate climate of fear, which only increased in the days that followed when another young woman, Diana Towers, was found murdered only 10 miles away at the site of the Roman fort Melandra Castle. The authorities, however, quickly discounted any link. The police launched an appeal for a man to come forward who had been seen against the skyline some 200 yards from where Susan's body was eventually found. This "running man" was seen about half an hour before Susan's body was discovered and was initially the chief suspect. More ominously, they also appealed for local 'peeping toms' (who were known to be watching parties of schoolchildren on the day) to come forward with any information they might have. By 8 July The Times reported that fifteen such individuals had come forward to talk to the police.

When Susan's body was examined it was discovered that she had not been sexually assaulted, but her body, particularly her legs, hands, arms and head, clearly indicated that she had been pushed to the ground, and that she had fought violently with her attacker. Dr. Stephen Jones, a Home Office pathologist, later recorded over 30 injuries, mostly bruises and abrasions, which indicated that she had made every attempt to defend herself. Her nails were all broken, and this seemed to indicate that her killer's face had been raked. She had been manually strangled, with the killer using one hand to throttle her, and her hands had been tied and lower clothing removed. The murder case quickly became national news, and Derbyshire police allocated 60 officers to try and track down her killer. Detective Superintendent Peter Burgess took a prominent part in the case.

The police initially looked without success at the film in Susan's camera to see if it could reveal any clues about her attacker. One of the problems the police faced was the possibility that the murder had been committed by a tourist. On 29 June 1983, therefore, police made a nationwide appeal for people to come forward and report any man who had unexpectedly cut short a holiday to the area, or was behaving in a suspicious way. They were still intrigued by the silhouette of a man seen on a ridge at Cave Dale above the site of the murder, but this figure was later eliminated from the enquiry when a man came forward to say that he had been horseplaying with his girlfriend. On 4 July, the police sealed off Castleton for four hours and stopped every motorist passing through in their search for Susan's killer. Those who said they had been in the area the week before then underwent more detailed questioning.

On 9 July 1983, the High Peak Coroner, Clive Rushton, opened and adjourned the inquest into Susan's death, pending the further police investigation. No cause of death was officially confirmed at that stage, and none of Susan's relatives were present. An interim death certificate was granted, however, which allowed formal preparations for her funeral to begin. Later that month a final death certificate was issued which listed Susan's cause of death as: "asphyxia due to obstruction of the airway". On 10 July 1983, Derbyshire police undertook a full-scale reconstruction of the day that Susan died, with Detective Constable Brenda Kirby playing the part of Susan. About 45 members of the public returned to the Dale, many of them potholers, hikers and day trippers. Amongst the witnesses was a young couple from North Wales who police thought were amongst the last to see Susan alive, and the 'running man' that detectives had originally thought might be a suspect.

Detectives with stopwatches and maps monitored the events, so that an accurate timeframe for the events of that day could be created. Vast areas of the moor were sealed off in an operation that took over four hours. Shortly after the reconstruction, police revealed that a 14-year-old girl had been stalked the same afternoon as Susan died by a man who had been watching her through binoculars. Fortunately, he had been frightened away. Press reports later described him as a man in his 30s or 40s, so it was decided that he could not have been Susan's killer. On 12 July, a local businessman (who had children of his own) put up rewards totalling £2,000 for any information that might help the police investigation, saying that he had been sickened by the deaths of Susan and Diana.

By the end of the police investigation, some 1,200 witness statements were taken, and some 2,000 questionnaires had been completed by the public. On 14 July 1983, Susan's funeral took place at the Baptist Church in Carter's Lane in Halesowen close to the family home in West Hagley. On 22 July, according to newspaper reports, police received a tip-off from an anonymous caller. The man left a six-digit number, and police appealed for him to contact them again. (Whether this call was genuine and a breakthrough for the case is not clarified in the subsequent newspaper reports.)

== Tourist film ==
In the middle of July, police also became especially interested in a film taken by an Australian tourist at the time of the murder. Experts at Central TV had seen what they thought was a figure of a man crouching, and the film was subsequently flown to NASA in Texas for a more detailed analysis. The police released the enhanced footage on 19 July. As it turned out, however, the film did not apparently yield anything of importance.

== Norman Smith ==
The police then arranged for five key witnesses to go back to the scene of the murder following the reconstruction, and announced on 24 July that they had new clues. Shortly afterward, police arrested Norman Hugh Smith, a 17-year-old computer student, who lived at Sunnyside Villas in Buxton Road in Castleton. He lived with his parents and two younger brothers and had just left Chesterfield Technical College. He first appeared in court at Buxton on 25 August 1983 charged with Susan's murder and was jeered by a large crowd on his arrival. He was remanded in custody until the following year.

== Trial ==
Smith's trial began on 20 February 1984 at Nottingham Crown Court. Both Renhard's and Smith's parents were present throughout. The prosecution alleged that Renhard had died to satisfy the sexual curiosity of an immature teenager: in police interviews, Smith had admitted that he wanted to see a woman's naked body. Smith's defence counsel, Martin Thomas, said that Renhard's death had been an accident, the clumsy attempts of an immature youth to steal a kiss. Smith had never had a girlfriend and was portrayed as a loner who loved computers, books, nature and stargazing, and who lived in fear of his strict father who later said: "Norman had no steady girlfriend unless you could call his computer a girlfriend. That's all he ever seemed to show an interest in. He was fanatical about electronics."

Douglas Draycott QC, prosecuting, said that the facts of the case were relatively simple: "She was an attractive girl and he made some sort of approach to her. Only he can tell us the exact details but there was obviously a struggle. Although he removed some clothes she was not sexually assaulted at all. The tragic fact is that it was the sexual curiosity of a very immature young man that led to this killing." Smith was described by his defence counsel as: "a stumbling, confused schoolboy" and his story was that he chatted to Susan whilst she was taking photographs for her project.

Smith said in his statement to police that: "I am not sure exactly what happened. I think I asked her the time and started talking. I can't remember much about it." She had suddenly stumbled and he fell on top of her, his forearm accidentally landing across her throat. Smith explained in court: "I moved closer, perhaps for a kiss or something. She must have stumbled because she went backwards and because I had my hand on her shoulder I went over as well. She ended up on her back, and I was on top of her." Smith said he had removed her trousers on impulse and said: "she had not moved and I heard a funny sound. I thought it was her breathing. I had not thought there was anything wrong, but obviously she did not seem to be alright. I got scared." He continued to insist that, when he left Susan lying on the footpath, she was still alive and that someone else must have come along and killed her. He also denied hitting Susan and maintained his story that she was still breathing and her eyes were moving when he left her.

Smith maintained that he thought Renhard was merely stunned. He said he tied her hands and covered her head with her cagoule when he left her "because her eyes were looking towards where I was going." "I didn't want her running down the hill to fetch people. I wanted to get away." Smith's defence counsel then went on to criticise the prosecution for allowing an earlier suspect who was arrested, a Japanese travel courier, to return home. The jury had also earlier seen colour photographs of Susan's body that indicated the extent of the struggle that had taken place, and the Home Office pathologist, Dr. Jones, in response to the questions of the defence counsel, admitted that many of the head injuries could have been caused by Susan hitting her head against stones on the ground. The jury also heard of an alleged confession by Smith to Detective Sergeant Brian Willis when Smith had broken down under interrogation and said: "it was an accident, I didn't mean to do it."

Douglas Draycott said that Smith's claims were "total rubbish" and that to believe his story meant believing in the most incredible coincidence in the world, i.e. that there could have been another killer on the loose in Cave Dale that same afternoon. Douglas Draycott outlined in court the forensic evidence linking Norman Smith to Susan's murder. Police had discovered a thumbprint on Susan's camera case and, on her jumper, a single red nylon fibre from Smith's jumper. The prosecution alleged that Smith had started walking out on the footpath from Castleton, and had come across Susan walking back into town. The Crown argued that Smith had made some kind of approach to Susan, and there had been a struggle in which she fought back as Smith tried to strip her. He had then manually strangled her. He then covered her face and head with her own cagoule, and placed her jeans over her legs to make her look decent. Draycott also told the jury that Smith had been evasive when initially interviewed and had denied any connection with the offence, but later admitted his curiosity about seeing a woman naked.

In court, Smith admitted that there had been a family cover-up, with his brother supporting the claim that he had been at home at the time of the murder, and his mother saying that the scratches on his face had been caused by the family cat. The police had, in fact, questioned Smith earlier in the investigation over these scratches. In his summing up, Mr. Justice Caulfield was in little doubt about the enormity of the crime. He said that Susan had been killed by a "very wicked man in an act that had "fouled" the Peak District beauty spot. Moreover, once dying or dead, his actions in stripping, tying and covering Susan's body amounted to an "act of desecration and insult". The killer's actions would "revolt the most miserable of people." The jury of 8 women and 4 men retired and took 2 hours, 40 minutes to reach their final verdict.

On 24 February 1984 Norman Smith was found guilty of the murder of Susan Renhard. As he was under the age of 18 at the time of the offence, he was ordered to be detained indefinitely "until Her Majesty's pleasure be known": in effect, a life sentence. As the verdict was delivered, he stood impassively in the dock, dressed in black and holding a red Bible. On the same day, Smith's solicitor, Mr. Timothy Oddy, announced that there would be an appeal against the sentence. Smith's mother, Shirley, said after the trial: "we are shattered by this. I still believe it was an accident. It was not premeditated."

== Tributes ==
In sentencing Smith, Mr. Justice Caulfield attempted to pay tribute to Susan and chose to deliberately echo the nickname of Castleton—'Gem of the Peaks'—by famously declaring: "The girl you killed, this jury said you strangled, she was a gem among maidens, and I have no doubt she fought to the point of her death to prevent the attack that you made on her modesty". Susan's father, David Renhard, a retired law lecturer, said shortly after the verdict was announced: "It has been a very stressful and emotional week. To see a young man sent down for life is very distressing whoever he is. I was really touched by the remarks of the judge about the sort of girl Susan was. She was just like that. She was very humorous and a lovely girl. The police have been wonderful in this investigation." He added: "We will miss our daughter but we will try and get on with our lives as best we can".

Smith's mother, Shirley, said: "I still believe he is innocent. I think it was an accident." Smith's father, Jim, later said that the Smiths felt "deep sympathy" for Susan's family. On 20 July 1985, Smith's appeal to challenge his murder conviction was refused by the Court of Appeal. Following the trial, David Renhard became heavily involved in the Society of Compassionate Friends, and Support After Murder and Manslaughter, two charities that seek to help relatives who have lost loved ones through homicide.
