= Ughill Hall shootings =

1986 shooting near Sheffield, South Yorkshire, England

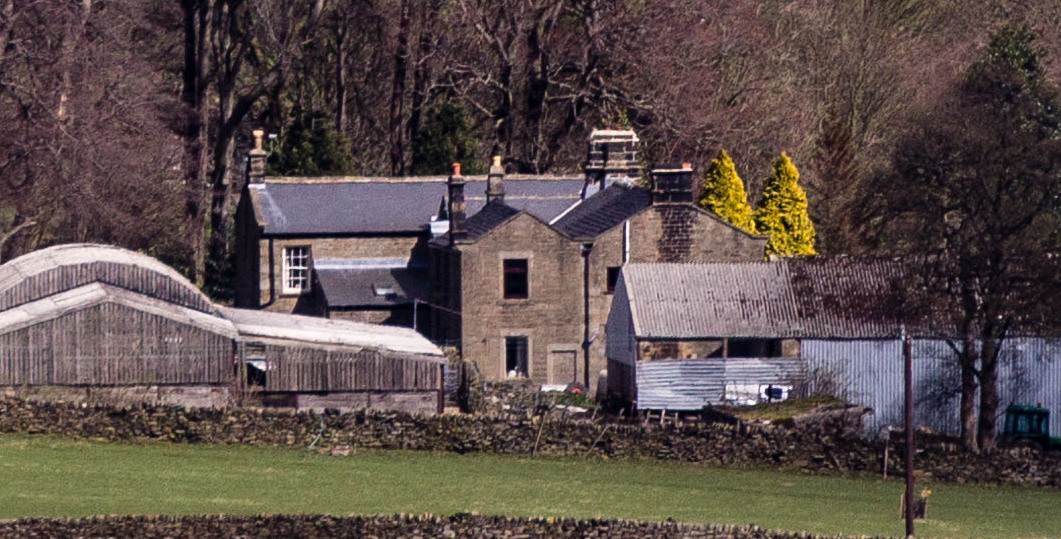
- Ughill Hall in 2015
- Date: 21 September 1986
- Location: Ughill Hall, Sheffield, England
- Deaths: 2
- Injuries: 1
- Convicted: Ian Wood
- Charges: Murder (×2), attempted murder, theft
- Verdict: Guilty
- Sentence: Two life sentences plus 15 years

On 21 September 1986, Ian Wood shot and killed his partner Danielle Ledez and her daughter Stephanie (aged 3), and severely injured Christopher (aged 5), Ledez's elder child, at Ughill Hall in Bradfield, Sheffield, United Kingdom. Wood left his .38 Enfield revolver in the kitchen and called the police before fleeing the scene. He went on the run for over a week, making several telephone calls to journalists and family members. Eight days later he threatened to jump off the Amiens Cathedral in France but was talked down by the police after seven hours. He was then extradited back to Sheffield for trial.

On 30 July 1987, Wood was convicted on two counts of murder, one of attempted murder and one of theft, after a week-long trial. He had pleaded not guilty to the murder of Danielle, instead submitting a manslaughter plea claiming he killed her to complete a suicide pact. An appeal against the guilty verdict was filed a month later and rejected in 1989. The case impacted upon British firearms policy, especially the manner in which regional police forces communicate over firearm ownership.

== Background ==
Ian Wood (born 1949) began renting Ughill Hall, an 18-room mansion on the outskirts of Bradfield, with his mistress Danielle Ledez in April 1986 after leaving his wife Margaret and his three children. Wood was a solicitor and the ex secretary of the Law Society in Sheffield.

Danielle Ledez (1948-1986) was a French teacher from Amiens, France, who moved to Ughill Hall with Wood and her two children whilst in the process of divorcing her second husband (and father of the children) Colin Lloyd, a teacher from Sheffield.

== Shootings ==
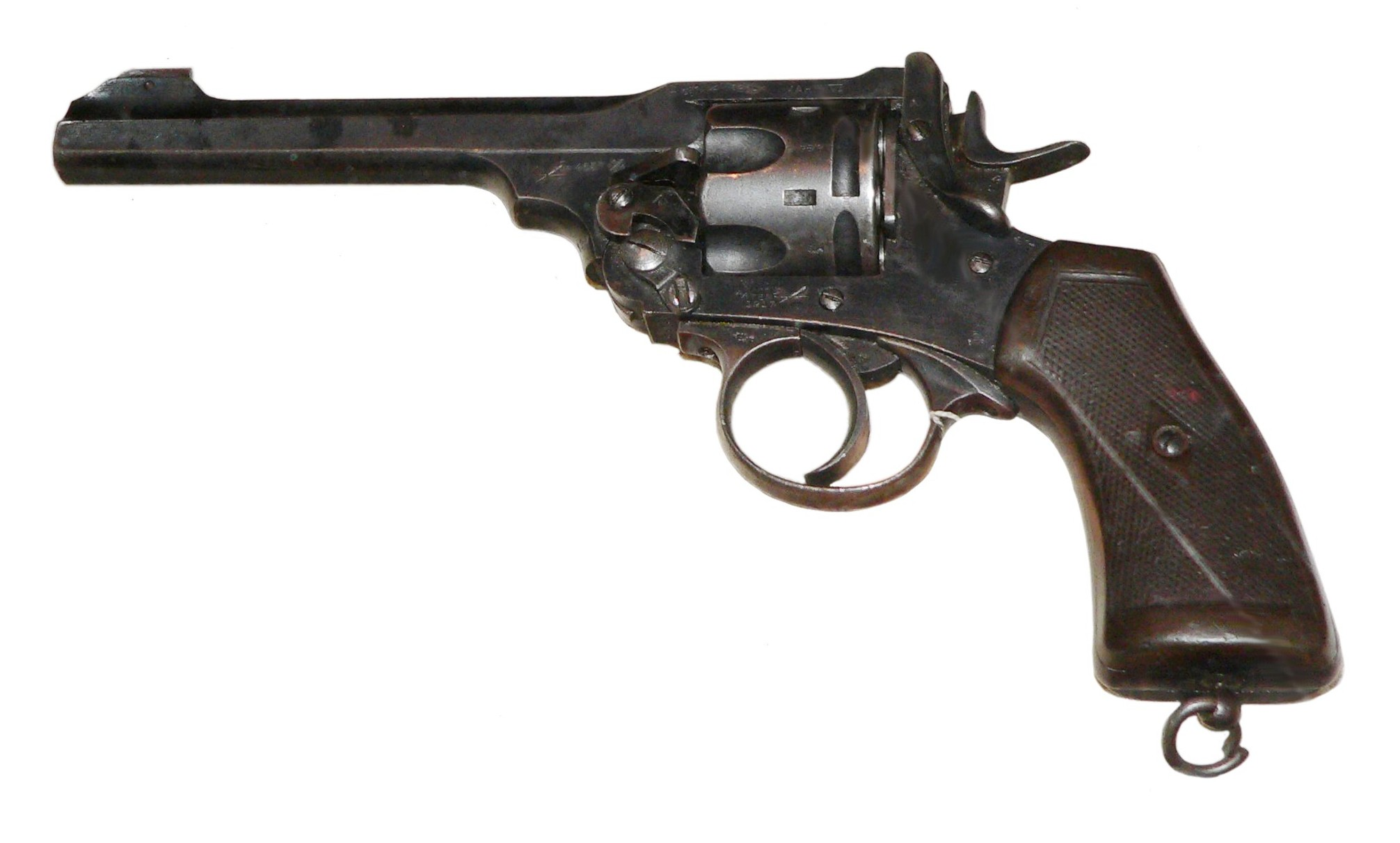
An Enfield No. 2 revolver similar to the one Wood used.

At approximately midnight on 21 September 1986, Wood went to the playroom in the mansion and killed his mistress Danielle Ledez by shooting her once in the head. Ledez was 10 weeks pregnant by Wood. Wood then proceeded to play hide-and-seek with Ledez's daughter Stephanie (aged 3), after which he led her into Christopher's bedroom and shot her twice in the head, killing her instantly. He then took Ledez's son Christopher (aged 5) into the bathroom and told him to close his eyes as he had a surprise for him, then shot him twice in the head. Wood then bludgeoned the boy with a large ruler four or five times in the back of the head.

Wood changed clothes, packed his bags, and left the house shortly afterwards, leaving the weapon he used, an .38 Enfield revolver, in the kitchen with one live round left. The police went to the mansion on the evening of 22 September 1986 after receiving a telephone call from Wood; finding all the doors and windows locked, they broke down the door. Christopher was rushed to Sheffield Children's Hospital with severe head injuries and was placed on life support after surviving without medical attention for 21 hours.

== Manhunt ==
=== Initial response ===
Following the discovery of the bodies, the police appealed to Wood to turn himself in and warned members of the public not to approach him as he may be armed. Wood's wife Margaret and their three children were put under police protection immediately, as was Ledez's husband Colin Lloyd. A total of five homes in England were put under protection throughout the manhunt. A formal arrest warrant was issued on 23 September 1986 with more details on Wood's flight, including the numberplate of the car he fled in.

=== Phone calls ===
On 23 September 1986, a police press conference was interrupted when Wood made a series of telephone calls to Brenda Tunney, a reporter for the local newspaper Sheffield Weekly Gazette. Wood refused to disclose his location but claimed the purpose of the calls was to "put his side".

Wood made no further telephone calls to either the police or journalists for nearly 48 hours after the initial series of calls. By 26 September he had made at least eight phone calls. On 27 September, Wood called Tunney four times asking about funeral arrangements for Ledez and her daughter. The police discussed the mental state of Wood with a consultant psychiatrist on the same day due to the firearm confiscations and the phone calls. The following day, Wood made three more calls to Tunney and threatened suicide in one of them; he claimed he killed because of "love and desperation, not anger and hate".

=== Potential whereabouts ===
On 25 September, a receptionist at the Automobile Association office in Barnstaple reported that a man matching Wood's description had requested an international driving licence. Interpol were notified of the case on the same day, after which French police interviewed Ledez's parents. Up until this point, Wood, who owned no other properties, was believed by police to still be in the Yorkshire area. After Wood's capture, British and French authorities were "puzzled" by the ease with which Wood travelled under his own name. At his trial, it was established that Wood had gone to a pub after committing the killings and then, over the course of the next few days, travelled to Dover where he caught a ferry to France.

=== Surrender ===
Ian Wood on the gargoyle at Amiens Cathedral

On 29 September, Wood joined a public tour of Amiens Cathedral, approximately 3 miles (4.8 km) away from Ledez's birthplace, but broke away from the tour group at about 12 noon, climbed over the parapet, and clung to a gargoyle about 200 feet (61 m) above the ground, threatening to commit suicide by jumping off. He left a note with a member of staff at the cathedral shortly beforehand informing them of his intention to commit suicide, which prompted them to call the police.

The police, firemen, the church's priest, and members from the British Consulate pleaded with Wood for seven hours, at which point Wood surrendered. A crowd of several hundred people had gathered to watch from below. Wood later claimed that he did not wish his family to see his fall on television, describing the scene as "a circus". Wood had telephoned Ledez's family to inform them of his intention to commit suicide.

== Legal proceedings ==
=== Extradition ===
A day after Wood's surrender, British police filed an extradition request to French authorities to send Wood back to the UK for prosecution. Wood decided not to object to the extradition request after a brief meeting with his family and was confident that he would receive a fair trial in a British court. On 7 October, a formal request on behalf of the Director of Public Prosecutions was made to a magistrate in Sheffield. Wood was flown back to the UK on 19 November where he was remanded in custody.

=== Remand ===
The police successfully applied to continue holding Wood on remand on double murder and attempted murder charges at Sheffield Magistrates' Court on 22 November. Wood made a further short committal appearance in court on 1 December and his trial was formally announced on 3 February 1987.

=== Trial ===
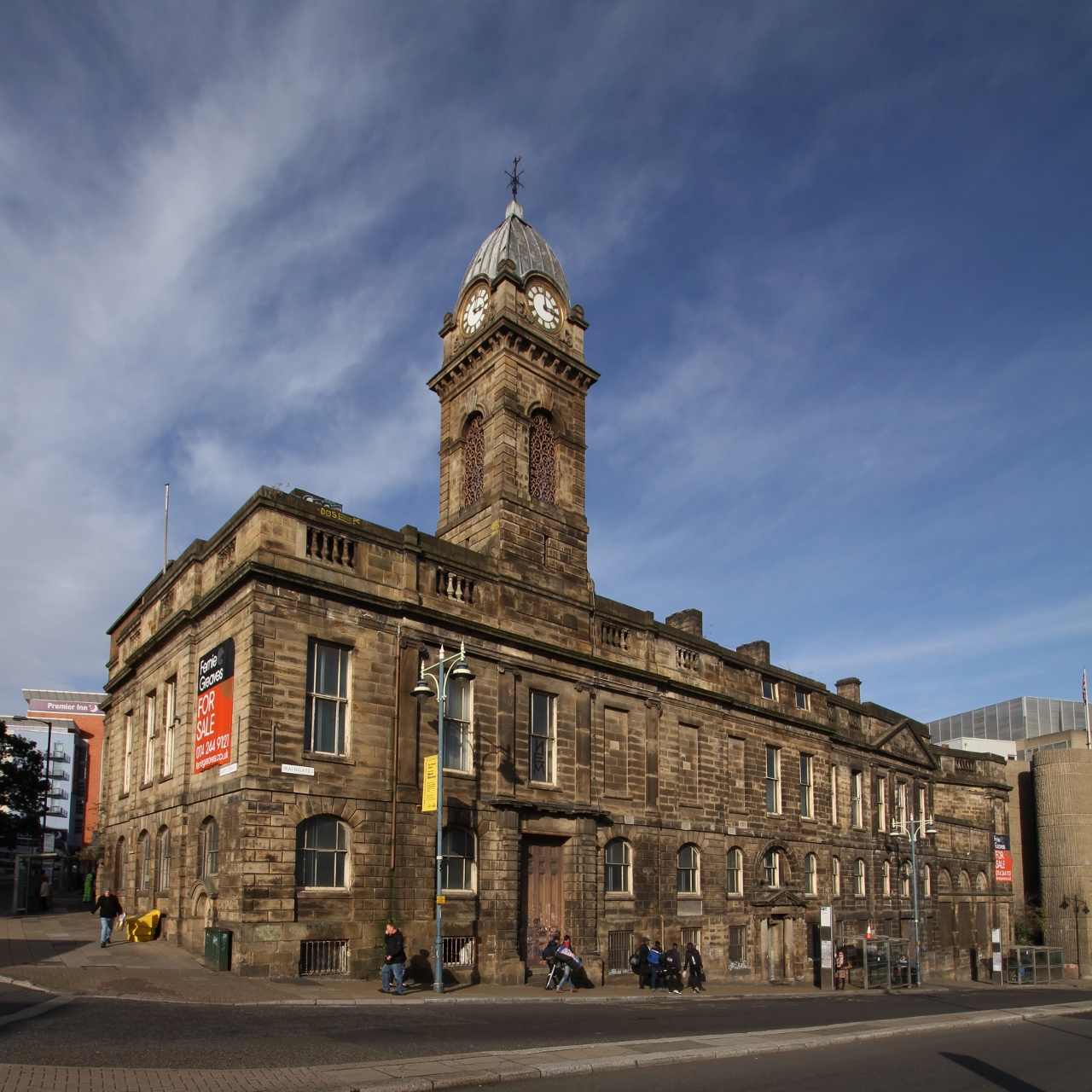
Sheffield Old Town Hall, the venue for Wood's trial

==== Pleas and charges ====
On 1 December 1986, the prosecution charged Wood on two counts of murder and one count of attempted murder, for Danielle, Stephanie, and Christopher, respectively. Wood also faced a specimen charge of stealing £84,000 from clients he represented in property deals, although the prosecution claimed the sum could have been £150,000.

Wood pleaded not guilty to the murder of Danielle and instead entered a manslaughter plea on the grounds that they had agreed to a suicide pact. The prosecution did not accept the manslaughter plea and pursued a trial for the murder of Danielle. However, Wood pleaded guilty to the murder of Stephanie and the attempted murder of Christopher. He also pleaded guilty to stealing £84,000 from clients.

==== Suicide pact claim ====
The Homicide Act 1957 states that if a person kills someone in pursuance of a suicide pact and then does not commit suicide themselves, they are guilty only of manslaughter and not murder. However, Geoffrey Rivlin, leading the prosecution, told the court that in such a situation the onus is on the killer to prove that a suicide pact was made.

Wood gave the court a detailed account of the five-point agreement he claimed to have made with Ledez as to what to do after the killings and before his suicide:

1. Visit a French church and light candles for Ledez and her children.
2. Send a detailed explanation of the deaths to the press.
3. Kill Ledez's husband, Colin Lloyd.
4. Ensure Ledez and her children were buried in a French village cemetery.
5. Visit their graves and lay flowers for them.

Rivlin argued that Wood's story did "not have a ring of truth about it". Several of Ledez's French friends who were interviewed by police claimed that Ledez had shown no signs of depression or suicidal intentions. In addition, her mother received a telephone call hours before Ledez died and she did not suspect her daughter was suicidal.

To support Wood's claim, the defence called Wood's mother, who said that Ledez had confided her suicidal intention to her on multiple occasions and that she feared that her husband Colin would physically harm her or Christopher. The witness also stated that Wood had called her within 24 hours of the shootings and explained the plan to her. The prosecution called Alan Wales, Wood's doctor, who testified that he advised the police to confiscate Wood's gun collection after an appointment on 11 November 1985. Wales said that Wood appeared "distressed" and prescribed him with antidepressants.

On 30 July 1987, the final day of the trial, the prosecution argued that Wood's suicide threat on Amiens Cathedral was not genuine and was done only to disguise his true motive, with Rivlin summarising that Wood "killed out of his obsessive hatred, not love". Gilbert Gray, leading the defence, argued that Wood had nothing to gain from lying about a suicide pact because he would be sentenced to life imprisonment for the murder and attempted murder of Ledez's children anyway.

==== Verdict and sentencing ====
On 31 July 1987, the jury at Sheffield Crown Court unanimously rejected Wood's claim that he killed Ledez as part of a suicide pact and found him guilty of murder. Justice Taylor sentenced Wood to life imprisonment for each murder, 12 years for the attempted murder, and three years for the specimen charges of theft from clients. Wood was struck off the Law Society register and the Law Society Compensation Fund paid at least £240,000 in compensation to the theft victims.

=== Appeal ===
On 28 August 1987, Wood's solicitor filed an appeal against the guilty verdict. The appeal was rejected on 25 July 1989.

== Aftermath ==
=== Previous confiscations and police dispute ===
After the trial, a dispute occurred between South Yorkshire Police and Sussex Police over which force was responsible for erroneously allowing Wood access to firearms. Wood's ten-piece gun collection had been confiscated twice; firstly in December 1985 over fears from his wife and doctor of deteriorating mental health and alcoholism, and secondly because of an administrative error in renewing his licence. The guns were returned two weeks after the first confiscation. South Yorkshire Police later said that they had to return them because there was no evidence that Wood was a threat to himself or others.

In March 1986, Wood bought 50 rounds of ammunition in Sheffield for his .38 Enfield revolver which he had inherited after his father used it to commit suicide. South Yorkshire Police ascribed these events to an "administrative mix-up" with Sussex Police, who were responsible for executing the firearms clause in Wood's father's will. Sussex Police said that when Wood asked for the gun and the remaining 11 rounds they tried to dissuade him but he returned a month later with a renewed firearms certificate from South Yorkshire Police. The differing interpretations of the Firearms Act by the two police forces resulted in the Home Office intervening and seeking a detailed explanation from both forces and holding talks with them over possible amendments to the Firearms Act.

=== Firearms policy ===
Bill Michie, the Member of Parliament for Sheffield Heeley, campaigned for stricter firearm ownership regulations, such as psychiatric assessment of prospective gun owners, in response to the murders. In October 1986, Michie asked Prime Minister Margaret Thatcher if the government would change its firearms policy in response to the murders, to which she responded: "The Home Office ... will keep that matter under permanent review".

Less than a month after Wood's conviction, the Hungerford massacre took place, in which Michael Robert Ryan killed 16 people. This prompted Parliament to pass the Firearms (Amendment) Act 1988, which banned civilian ownership of nearly all semi-automatic weapons.

== See also ==
- Killamarsh killings (2021)
- Shiregreen child murders (2019)
