= Mick Philpott =

British arsonist also convicted of attempted murder, manslaughter, assault and GBH

- Born: Michael Stanley Philpott; December 1956 (age 69); Derbyshire, England
- Children: 18 (6 killed)
- Status: Convicted (imprisoned)
- Convictions: Attempted murder Grievous bodily harm with intent Assault occasioning actual bodily harm Common assault Manslaughter
- Penalty: Attempted murder/GBH: 7 years' imprisonment; Manslaughter: Life imprisonment (mininum term of 15 years)

Details
- Imprisoned at: HMP Wakefield

Michael Stanley Philpott (born 1 December 1956) is a British convicted mass killer who was found guilty in April 2013 of causing the deaths of six of his children by arson. Prior to his conviction, Philpott had made several media appearances because of his benefits-funded lifestyle and polygynous relationships.

Following an eight-week trial, Philpott and his wife Mairead, together with their friend Paul Mosley, were found guilty of the manslaughter of the Philpotts' six children. Philpott was given a life sentence with a minimum term of 15 years. Psychologist Glenn Wilson described Philpott as clinically a "psychopath" and "exhibitionist" with "antisocial personality disorder."

== History of domestic violence ==
Mick Philpott's attitude to women has been described as "controlling", "domineering", "violent" and "manipulative". In July 1978, aged 21, Philpott attempted to murder Kim Hill, his girlfriend of two years; their relationship began when she was aged 15. He had previously shot Hill in the groin with a crossbow because he felt her dress had been too short, and had cracked her kneecap with a hammer when she paid too much attention to a baby she had been minding. Philpott attempted to kill Hill by stabbing her over a dozen times as she was lying in bed, because she sent him a letter saying she was leaving him. He also stabbed Hill's mother when she came to her daughter's aid. Hill suffered collapsed lungs and a punctured bladder, kidney and liver. Philpott was convicted of attempted murder of Hill, and grievous bodily harm with intent against her mother, and was sentenced to seven years in prison in December 1978. Philpott was released after three years and two months.

Philpott married Pamela Lomax in 1986. He had three children with Lomax, two sons and a daughter. Lomax said that Philpott was controlling, and she prayed he would move on to someone else. Her wish was fulfilled when Philpott met Heather Kehoe, then aged 14, in Rainworth, Nottinghamshire; Philpott was 37. On her 16th birthday, Kehoe ran away from her parents to live with Philpott. She gave birth to two children, both boys, in quick succession, but Philpott beat Kehoe because he wanted a daughter. Kehoe described Philpott teaching his older sons to be violent towards her. Philpott wanted Kehoe to produce more children, but she did not conceive again. In 1991, he was given a two-year conditional discharge for assault occasioning actual bodily harm after headbutting a colleague.

In 2000, Philpott met Mairead Duffy, a 19-year-old single mother born in England to an Irish family, who had left a previous volatile relationship. Duffy moved into Philpott's house shortly after, and the couple married in May 2003. In 2001, Philpott met Lisa Willis, a 16-year-old orphan and single mother, who became his mistress. Philpott invited Willis to move into his council house, which was larger than hers; in 2002. Willis served as bridesmaid at Philpott and Duffy's wedding. On 23 December 2002, having left Philpott, Kehoe gained legal custody of her two children. In 2010, Philpott was given a police caution for slapping Mairead and dragging her outside by her hair.

== Benefits lifestyle ==
In 2006, Philpott was being heavily criticised in the tabloid media when he requested a larger council house for his family, which then consisted of his wife Mairead, then aged 25; his mistress Lisa Willis, then 22; and four children born to Mairead, three to Willis, and Willis's child conceived prior to meeting him. The 1978 conviction for attempted murder was revealed at this time. After Willis gave birth to her fourth child by Philpott, the press revealed that both she and Mairead were expecting babies, due in March 2007. Before their birth, Philpott appeared on The Jeremy Kyle Show to defend his lifestyle, saying that he would like to marry one woman and divorce the other, and added that he would have a vasectomy.

In 2007, Philpott appeared in an episode of the ITV documentary series Ann Widdecombe Versus in which the then Conservative MP Ann Widdecombe spent a week with him and tried to persuade him to change his lifestyle. Nancy Banks-Smith in The Guardian reported that Widdecombe gave him "a large slice of her mind", but "decamped" rather than sleep in his caravan. Widdecombe found Philpott three jobs, one of which was with a barrel-making firm, but he did not turn up for work on the first day and the job fell through. In the documentary, Philpott was shown to be living in a caravan in his garden, in which his wife and mistress would alternate in spending nights with him. Widdecombe said that Philpott did not care about anyone and that he used the word "bitch" to refer to both his wife and his mistress. Widdecombe also said she noticed that none of his children sought affection from him.

== Further convictions ==
It was revealed during Philpott's manslaughter trial that Mairead became pregnant by another man whilst the couple were dogging, an activity in which they began to participate during 2011. Mairead had an abortion at Philpott's instruction.

A court hearing a week before the fire concerned a road rage incident during November 2011 in which Philpott had punched another driver, for which he had pleaded guilty to common assault, but denied dangerous driving. At the hearing, Philpott was bailed and was awaiting trial.

== Arson attack ==
=== Fire ===
On 11 May 2012, the Philpott family's home at 18 Victory Road, Osmaston, Derby, was seriously damaged by fire at around 04:00. Five children (Jade, 10; John, 9; Jack, 7; Jesse, 6 and Jayden, 5), who had been asleep upstairs, all died at the scene, while their half-brother, Duwayne, 13, died in hospital two days later. All of these deaths were caused by smoke inhalation.

In the days following the fire, the family's local Catholic church held memorial services. On 16 May, Philpott and his wife held an emotional news conference, in which they purported to describe the events concerning the fire. A charity, Catch Me When I Fall, was set up by local residents to help the family of the children. A book of condolence at Derby Cathedral was later signed by hundreds of people. A fund to pay for the funerals raised over £11,000 by members of the public living in the same area as the Philpotts. The children's joint funeral took place on 22 June 2012 at St Mary's Church, Derby, with Mick and Mairead Philpott not attending as they had been remanded in custody charged with murder.

=== Criminal investigation ===
On 14 May, police stated that petrol had been found inside the letterbox to the Philpott residence, thus sparking a murder investigation. Willis, who had a court hearing over custody of her children with Philpott scheduled on the morning of the fire, was initially arrested on suspicion of murder along with her brother-in-law Ian Cousins, but both were released without charge. Meanwhile, witnesses reported that Philpott behaved strangely for someone who had recently lost several of his children, and appeared to like the media attention. The police bugged the Philpotts' hotel room and gained evidence confirming the couple were responsible for the fire, including the involvement of friend Paul Mosley, with whom Mairead was heard engaging in a sex act.

Philpott and Mairead were arrested on suspicion of murder on 28 May 2012. The police sought additional time for questioning, and the couple were charged with murder on 30 May 2012. A discarded petrol container and glove had been found near the house, and in November forensic investigators discovered that the clothes of the Philpotts and Mosley had petrol on them. On 5 November, Mosley was arrested and charged with murder; this charge was later downgraded to manslaughter. Mosley had previously been arrested in the enquiry and was released on bail in June 2012. The charges against Philpott and Mairead were also reduced to manslaughter, as it was decided that the couple had not intended to kill their children. Instead, they had wanted to frame Willis for the fire, win back custody of the children and continue to claim benefits for them.

=== Trial and sentencing ===
The trial commenced at Nottingham Crown Court on 12 February 2013. Richard Latham QC led the prosecution on behalf of the Crown Prosecution Service. Anthony Orchard QC led the defence for Philpott, Sean Smith QC led the defence for Mairead, and Benjamin Nolan QC led the defence for Mosley. On 2 April, Philpott and Mairead, along with Mosley, were each found guilty of the manslaughter of the six children.

Sentencing was due to take place on 3 April, but was postponed as the judge, Mrs Justice Thirlwall, wanted more time to consider the sentence. Philpott's previous criminal convictions, which had not been revealed to the jury, were disclosed at this point. On 4 April, Philpott was sentenced to life imprisonment, with a minimum tariff of fifteen years, while Mairead and Mosley were each sentenced to seventeen years (of which they would need to serve at least half before any release on licence). On 29 November, an appeal by Mairead against the length of her sentence (not the verdict) was heard. The grounds of the appeal were mainly that Mairead was under the control of her husband and could not exercise a free choice in her conduct; the appeal was dismissed. Mairead was released on licence in 2020 after serving half of her sentence.

In 2025, Mosley, who had been released from prison on licence, having served half of his 17-year sentence, was found dead at a property in Portsmouth on 4 October.
