= Nottingham Crown Court =

Judicial building in Nottingham, England

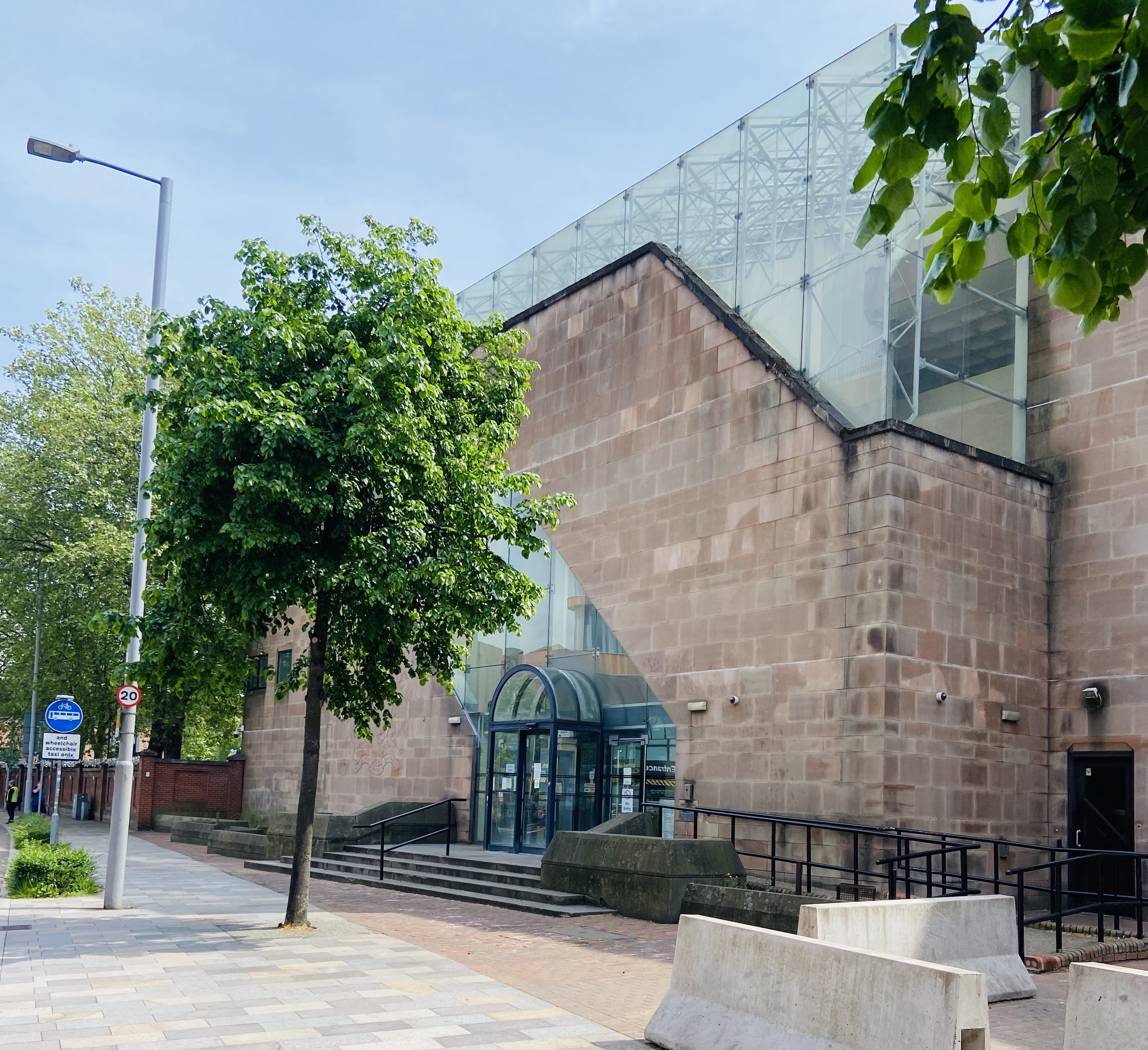
- Nottingham Crown and County Courts front on Canal Street with the Nottingham Canal behind the building

- Shown in Nottinghamshire
- 52.9483°N 1.1466°W
- Location: 60 Canal Street, Nottingham NG1 7EL

History
- Built: 1981

Site notes
- Architect: Property Services Agency
- Architectural style: Modern style

Nottingham Crown Court, or more formally the High Court of Justice and Crown Court, Nottingham is a Crown Court and meeting place of the High Court of Justice on Canal Street in Nottingham, England. The building also accommodates the County Court and the Family Court.

== History ==
Until the early 1980s, the Crown Court sat in the Shire Hall on High Pavement. However, as the number of court cases in Nottingham grew, it became necessary to commission a more substantial courthouse for criminal matters. The site selected by the Lord Chancellor's Department on Canal Street was occupied by a row of shops (including a baker's shop owned by the amateur astronomer, Thomas Bush) and an old canal-side factory.

The new building was designed by architects, P. Harvard, K. Bates and J. Mansell, on behalf of the Property Services Agency and faced with buff stone. The building was opened in two phases: the first phase, which cost £2.2 million, opened in 1980 and the second phase, which cost £6.2 million, opened in 1988. The design involved a glass atrium which projected forward, connecting two wings which were faced with extensive expanses of stone. Internally, the building was equipped with nine courtrooms.

== High-profile cases ==
- February 1984 – Conviction of Norman Smith for the murder of Susan Renhard
- May 1993 – Conviction of nurse Beverley Allitt for the murder and attempted murder of 13 children at Grantham and Kesteven Hospital
- July 2004 – Conviction of Alan Pennell, 16, for the murder of Luke Walmsley, 14
- May 2005 – Conviction of Peter Williams for the murder of jeweller Marian Bates
- October 2005 – Conviction of Mark Kelly and Junior Andrews for the murder of schoolgirl Danielle Beccan
- December 2009 – Conviction of Susan Bacon, Michael Bacon and Peter Jacques for the murder of gamekeeper Nigel Bacon
- January 2010 – Conviction of Stewart Hutchinson, jailed for life for the murder of Colette Aram
- January 2011 – Collapse of the trial of climate protestors charged with conspiring to shut down Ratcliffe-on-Soar Power Station
- April 2013 – Conviction of Mick Philpott and others for the manslaughter of six of his children in a house fire in Derby
- June 2014 – Conviction of Susan Edwards and husband Christopher Edwards for the murders of her parents in 1998, both sentenced to 25 years
- July 2012 and July 2015 – Conviction of Charlotte Collinge in 2012 for the murder of husband Clifford Collinge, sentenced to 23 years with two accomplices both sentenced to 18 years. Following a 2015 re-trial, Charlotte Collinge was cleared and accomplices found guilty with sentences re-imposed
- January 2024 – Valdo Calocane, the perpetrator of 2023 Nottingham attacks, sentenced to be detained at Ashworth Hospital for the rest of his life after he killed three victims.

== See also ==
- Nottingham Magistrates' Court
- National Justice Museum
