= 1832 in architecture =

The year 1832 in architecture involved some significant architectural events and new buildings.

== Buildings and structures ==
=== Buildings opened ===
- January – Theatre Royal, Wexford, Ireland (demolished 2006)

=== Buildings completed ===
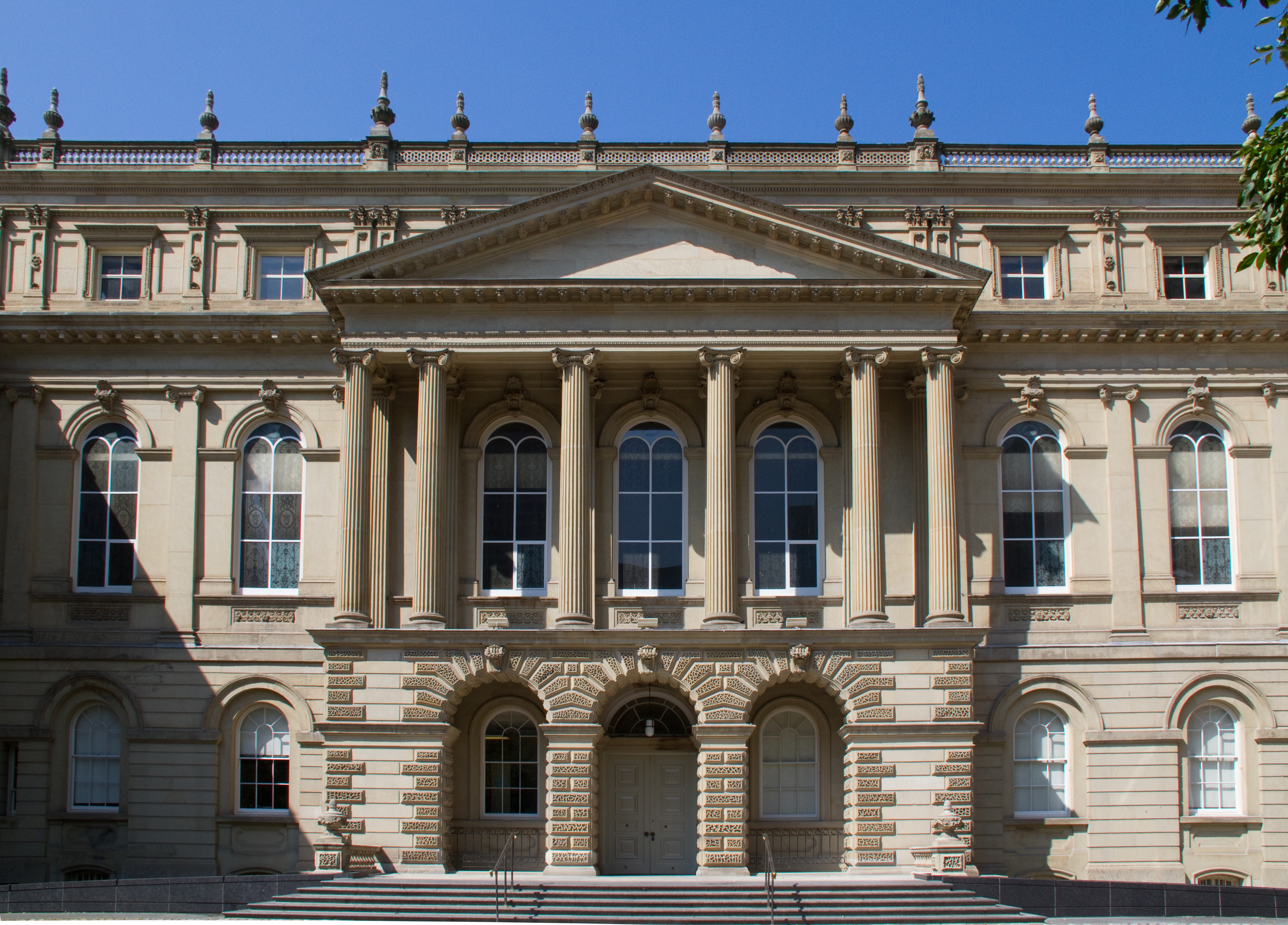
Osgoode Hall, Toronto, Canada

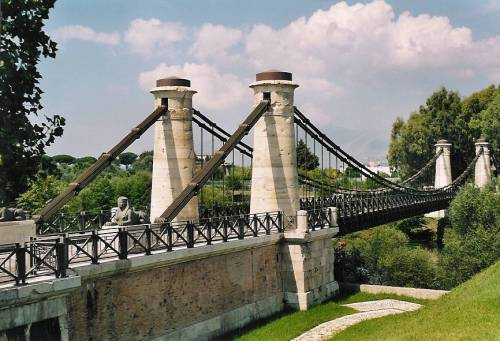
Bridge Real Ferdinando sul Garigliano

- Church of Our Saviour, Qaqortoq, Greenland.
- Cutlers' Hall, Sheffield, England, designed by Samuel Worth and Benjamin Broomhead Taylor.
- Drapers' Hall, Coventry, England, designed by Thomas Rickman.
- Surgeons' Hall, Edinburgh, Scotland, designed by William Henry Playfair.
- Replacement Old City Gaol, Bristol, England, designed by Richard Shackleton Pope.
- Osgoode Hall, Toronto for The Law Society of Upper Canada, designed by John Ewart and W. W. Baldwin.
- Royal City of Dublin Hospital, Ireland, designed by Albert E. Murray.
- Cathedral of the Holy Trinity, Gibraltar.
- Hill's Academy, Essex, Connecticut.
- Maderup Mølle, Funen, Denmark (now in The Funen Village)
- Théâtre des Folies-Dramatiques, Paris.
- The Mount, Sheffield, England (residential terrace), designed by William Flockton.
- Staines Bridge (across the River Thames in England), designed by George Rennie.
- Marlow Bridge (suspension, across the River Thames in England), designed by William Tierney Clark.
- Bridge Real Ferdinando sul Garigliano (suspension, in the Kingdom of Naples), designed by Luigi Giura.
- George IV Bridge in Edinburgh, designed by Thomas Hamilton.
- Church of St Dunstan-in-the-West, Fleet Street, London, completed after the death in July of its designer John Shaw, Sr. by his son, John Shaw, Jr.
- Stirling New Bridge in Scotland, designed by Robert Stevenson, completed.

== Awards ==
- Grand Prix de Rome, architecture: Jean-Arnoud Léveil.

== Births ==
- March 23 – Charles Henry Driver, English architect (died 1900)
- March 29 – William Swinden Barber, English architect (died 1908)
- September 25 – William Le Baron Jenney, American architect (died 1907)
- October 10 – Henry Hunter, English-born architect working in Tasmania (died 1892)
- December 15 – Gustave Eiffel, French civil engineer (died 1923)
- December 22 – Henry Augustus Sims, American architect working in Philadelphia (died 1875)
- date unknown – Frederick Thomas Pilkington, English-born architect working in Scotland (died 1898)

== Deaths ==
- June 4 – William Heste, Russian architect, civil engineer and town planner of Scottish descent
- July 30 – John Shaw, Sr., English architect (born 1776)
- September 22 – William Fowler, English architect and engraver (born 1761)
- November 19 – John Paterson, Scottish architect
- December 19 – Augustus Charles Pugin, French-born English architectural draughtsman (born 1762)
