= Listed buildings in Sheffield City Centre =

This is a list of listed buildings in Sheffield City Centre, covering the S1 postcode district in the City of Sheffield, South Yorkshire, England. The district contains 137 listed buildings that are recorded in the National Heritage List for England. Of these, two are listed at Grade I, the highest of the three grades, 12 are at Grade II*, the middle grade, and the others are at Grade II, the lowest grade.

For other areas inside the Sheffield Inner Ring Road which are sometimes regarded as part of the city centre, see listed buildings in S2, listed buildings in S3, listed buildings in S4 and listed buildings in S10.

== Key ==
Grade	Criteria
I	Buildings of exceptional interest, sometimes considered to be internationally important
II*	Particularly important buildings of more than special interest
II	Buildings of national importance and special interest

== Buildings ==
Name and location	Street	Photograph	Date	Notes	Grade
Castle Gateway Remains; 53.38450°N 1.46308°W	Castle Market		13th century		II
Castle Remains; 53.38493°N 1.46302°W	Castle Market		13th century		II
Castle Courtyard Remains; 53.38467°N 1.46374°W	Castle Market		Late 13th century		II
Sheffield Cathedral; 53.38327°N 1.46946°W	Church Street		1430		I
Old Queen's Head; 53.38093°N 1.46308°W	Pond Hill		About 1475		II*
Upper Chapel; 53.38094°N 1.46884°W	Norfolk Street		1700		II
Old Bank House; 53.38383°N 1.46838°W	Hartshead		1728		II
14–22 Paradise Square; 53.38409°N 1.47014°W	Paradise Square		1736		II*
16 George Street; 53.38217°N 1.46729°W	George Street		Mid 18th century		II
1–15 Paradise Square; 53.38368°N 1.47066°W	Paradise Square		1771		II*
4–12 Paradise Square; 53.38398°N 1.46990°W	Paradise Square		1771		II*
24 Paradise Square; 53.38403°N 1.47076°W	Paradise Square		1771		II*
Brown Bear; 53.38054°N 1.46788°W	Norfolk Street		Late 18th century		II
12–13 East Parade; 53.38338°N 1.46851°W	East Parade		Late 18th century		II
17 and 19 Paradise Square; 53.38376°N 1.47081°W	Paradise Square		1777		II*
Leader House; 53.37966°N 1.46680°W	Surrey Street		1780		II
Girls' Charity School; 53.38336°N 1.47009°W	St James' Row		1786		II
Abacus House; 53.38100°N 1.46801°W	Norfolk Street		About 1791		II
Hallam House; 53.37816°N 1.46671°W	Arundel Street		1791		II
Venture Works; 53.37829°N 1.46656°W	Arundel Street		1791		II
Anglo Works; 53.38202°N 1.47313°W	Trippet Lane		About 1800		II
Old Cathedral Vicarage; 53.38303°N 1.47003°W	St James' Row		About 1800		II
Victoria Chambers; 53.38410°N 1.46819°W	Fig Tree Lane		About 1800		II
Walkabout Inn; 53.38093°N 1.47473°W	Carver Street		1804	Designed by W. Jenkins	II
35 Carver Street; 53.38034°N 1.47357°W	Carver Street		1812		II
Butchers Wheel; 53.37747°N 1.46782°W	Eyre Lane		1819		II*
Montgomery Chambers; 53.38323°N 1.46853°W	East Parade		About 1820		II
Queen Street Chambers; 53.38450°N 1.46842°W	Queen Street		About 1820		II
92 Arundel Street; 53.37659°N 1.46893°W	Arundel Street		Early 19th century		II
92A Arundel Street; 53.37646°N 1.46905°W	Arundel Street		Early 19th century		II
30 Bank Street; 53.38454°N 1.46714°W	Bank Street		Early 19th century		II
36 & 38 Bank Street; 53.38458°N 1.46732°W	Bank Street		Early 19th century	Forms part of Bank Street Arts	II
Boys' Charity School; 53.38352°N 1.46852°W	East Parade		1825		II
23 Carver Street; 53.38047°N 1.47387°W	Carver Street		Early 19th century		II
11 East Parade; 53.38331°N 1.46851°W	East Parade		Early 19th century		II
Former Post Office; 53.38195°N 1.46436°W	Flat Street		Early 19th century		II
48–50 Garden Street; 53.38371°N 1.47699°W	Garden Street		Early 19th century		II
Howard Hotel; 53.37821°N 1.46500°W	Pond Street		Early 19th century		II
24 Rockingham Lane; 53.38072°N 1.47513°W	Rockingham Lane		Early 19th century		II
St George's Church; 53.38173°N 1.48071°W	Portobello		1825	Designed by Woodhead and Hirst	II
St George's Wall and Gate Piers; 53.38197°N 1.47970°W	Portobello		1825		II
9–14 St James' Row; 53.38318°N 1.47008°W	St James' Row		Early 19th century		II
13 & 15 Westfield Terrace; 53.38038°N 1.47664°W	Westfield Terrace		Early 19th century		II
26 & 28 Bank Street; 53.38451°N 1.46696°W	Bank Street		About 1830		II
40 & 42 Bank Street; 53.38453°N 1.46744°W	Bank Street		About 1830		II
Morton Works; 53.38123°N 1.47503°W	West Street		About 1830		II
8 & 10 Norfolk Row; 53.38115°N 1.46881°W	Norfolk Row		About 1830		II
22 Norfolk Row; 53.38104°N 1.46827°W	Norfolk Row		About 1830		II
19 North Church Street; 53.38405°N 1.46952°W	North Church Street		About 1830		II
Sheffield Central Deaf Club; 53.37978°N 1.46728°W	Surrey Street		About 1830		II
67 & 69 Surrey Street; 53.38039°N 1.46799°W	Surrey Street		About 1830		II
32 Cambridge Street; 53.37921°N 1.47220°W	Cambridge Street		1832	Forms part of The Cutler pub	II
Cutlers' Hall; 53.38229°N 1.46964°W	Church Street		1832	Designed by Samuel Worth and B. B. Taylor	II*
Mount Zion Chapel; 53.37992°N 1.47706°W	Westfield Terrace		1834		II
Truro Works; 53.37460°N 1.46602°W	Matilda Street		1830s		II
17 Church Street; 53.38226°N 1.47003°W	Church Street		1838	Designed by Samuel Worth	II
22 & 24 Bank Street; 53.38454°N 1.46690°W	Bank Street		1840		II
52, 54 and 56 Garden Street; 53.38373°N 1.47724°W	Garden Street		About 1840		II
12–20 Norfolk Row; 53.38111°N 1.46860°W	Norfolk Row		About 1840		II
111, 113 & 117 Norfolk Street; 53.38046°N 1.46819°W	Norfolk Street		About 1840		II
17 North Church Street; 53.38398°N 1.46945°W	North Church Street		About 1840		II
The Stonehouse; 53.38226°N 1.47031°W	Church Street		About 1840		II
Three Tuns; 53.38389°N 1.47132°W	Silver Street Head		About 1840		II
16 St James' Row; 53.38347°N 1.47010°W	St James' Row		About 1845		II
Sylvester Works Workshops; 53.37410°N 1.47070°W	Sylvester Street		About 1845		II
Cathedral Church of St Marie; 53.38130°N 1.46818°W	Norfolk Row		1848	Designed by Matthew Hadfield	II
18 & 20 Bank Street; 53.38450°N 1.46678°W	Bank Street		Mid 19th century		II
Blonk Street Bridge; 53.38550°N 1.46220°W	Blonk Street		Mid 19th century		II
Duke of Norfolk's Estate Office; 53.38291°N 1.47056°W	St James' Street		About 1850		II
2 & 3 East Parade; 53.38299°N 1.46855°W	East Parade		Mid 19th century		II
Graduate Pub; 53.37991°N 1.46734°W	Surrey Street		About 1850		II
Leah's Yard; 53.37969°N 1.47239°W	Cambridge Street		Mid 19th century		II*
15 North Church Street; 53.38390°N 1.46953°W	North Church Street		Mid 19th century		II
72 Queen Street; 53.38448°N 1.46859°W	Queen Street		Mid 19th century		II
Scissor Forge; 53.38060°N 1.47372°W	Carver Street		Mid 19th century		II
Sterling Works; 53.37720°N 1.46844°W	Arundel Street		About 1850		II
County Court Hall; 53.38455°N 1.46814°W	Bank Street		1854		II
St Matthew's; 53.37966°N 1.47326°W	Carver Street		1855	Designed by William Flockton	II
216 and 218 Solly Street Workshops; 53.38392°N 1.47946°W	Solly Street		About 1860		II
Statue of James Montgomery; 53.38322°N 1.46878°W	Church Street		1861	Designed by John Bell	II
5 Church Street; 53.38230°N 1.46929°W	Church Street		1867	Designed by Flockton & Abbott	II
Sheffield Waterworks Company Offices; 53.38038°N 1.47312°W	Division Street		1867		II
12 & 14 George Street; 53.38238°N 1.46720°W	George Street		About 1870		II
Sanctuary; 53.38294°N 1.47032°W	St James' Street		About 1870		II
Sheffield railway station 53.37802°N 1.46229°W	Sheaf Street		1870	Designed by Charles Trubshaw	II
Yorkshire Bank; 53.38333°N 1.46405°W	Haymarket		1871	Former post office and stock exchange	II
Sheffield United Gas Light Company Offices; 53.38330°N 1.46289°W	Commercial Street		1874	Designed by Matthew Ellison Hadfield	II
Channing Hall; 53.38070°N 1.46886°W	Surrey Street		Late 19th century		II
City Works; 53.37402°N 1.46833°W	Mary Street		Late 19th century		II
Crucible Stack; 53.38564°N 1.46274°W	Blonk Street		Late 19th century		II
Gibson Works; 53.37340°N 1.47039°W	Mary Street		Late 19th century		II
James Montgomery Memorial Fountain; 53.38294°N 1.47810°W	Broad Lane		About 1875		II
104 Mary Street; 53.37387°N 1.46852°W	Mary Street		Late 19th century		II
Old Monk; 53.38068°N 1.46784°W	Norfolk Street		Late 19th century		II
Ruskin Building; 53.38079°N 1.46766°W	Norfolk Street		About 1875		II
Sellers Wheel; 53.37730°N 1.46749°W	Arundel Street		Late 19th century		II
Sylvester Works; 53.37424°N 1.47094°W	Sylvester Street		About 1875		II
Provincial House; 53.38414°N 1.47824°W	Solly Street		1878	Designed by M. E. Hadfield & Son	II
Cairns Chambers; 53.38263°N 1.47068°W	Church Street		About 1880		II
Challenge Works; 53.37636°N 1.46915°W	Arundel Street		About 1880		II
Gladstone Building; 53.38269°N 1.47008°W	Church Street		About 1880		II
Sheffield City Grammar School; 53.38153°N 1.47166°W	Leopold Street		1880	Designed by T. J. Flockton and E. R. Robson	II
Aberdeen Works; 53.37935°N 1.47615°W	Trafalgar Street		1883		II
Parade Chambers; 53.38275°N 1.46841°W	High Street		1884	Designed by M. E. Hadfield & Son	II
Wharncliffe House; 53.38454°N 1.46758°W	Bank Street		About 1885		II
Sir Frederick Mappin Building; 53.38193°N 1.47931°W	Mappin Street		1886	Designed by William Flockton	II
7 Leopold Street; 53.38216°N 1.47129°W	Leopold Street		1888	Designed by John Dodsley Webster	II
49–63 Fargate; 53.38121°N 1.46933°W	Fargate		1890		II
Head Post Office; 53.38223°N 1.46454°W	Fitzalan Square		About 1890		II
Salvation Army Citadel; 53.37944°N 1.47089°W	Cross Burgess Street		About 1890		II
1–9 York Street; 53.38288°N 1.46826°W	York Street		About 1890		II
Bow Centre; 53.38162°N 1.47252°W	Holly Street		1894	Designed by J. B. Mitchell-Withers	II
Leopold Chambers; 53.38232°N 1.47135°W	Leopold Street		1894	Designed by Holmes & Watson	II
2 High Street; 53.38225°N 1.46819°W	High Street		1895		II
Prudential Assurance Building; 53.37919°N 1.47035°W	Pinstone Street		1896	Designed by Alfred Waterhouse	II
Foster's Buildings; 53.38246°N 1.46784°W	High Street		1897	Designed by Flockton, Gibbs & Flockton	II
Lyceum Theatre; 53.38047°N 1.46668°W	Tudor Square		1897	Designed by W. G. R. Sprague	II*
Town Hall; 53.38037°N 1.46989°W	Pinstone Street		1897	Designed by E. W. Mountford	I
Holly Building; 53.38142°N 1.47247°W	Holly Street		1899	Designed by H. W. Lockwood	II
Bankers Draft; 53.38334°N 1.46657°W	Market Place		About 1900		II
4–8 East Parade; 53.38313°N 1.46851°W	East Parade		About 1900		II
Cathedral House; 53.38127°N 1.46762°W	Norfolk Row		1903		II
Victoria Hall; 53.38172°N 1.46703°W	Norfolk Street		1908	Designed by Waddington Son & Dunkerley and W. J. Hale	II
White Building; 53.38275°N 1.46512°W	Fitzalan Square		1908	Designed by Gibbs & Flockton	II
Boundary wall 53.37936°N 1.46985°W	St Paul's Parade		1910	Incorporates examples of standard measures	II
Statue of Edward VII; 53.38284°N 1.46465°W	Fitzalan Square		1913	Designed by Alfred Drury	II
35 George Street; 53.38213°N 1.46681°W	George Street		1914		II
Kemsley House; 53.38291°N 1.46775°W	High Street		1916	Designed by Gibbs, Flockton and Teather	II
War Memorial; 53.38032°N 1.47222°W	Barkers Pool		About 1920	Upgraded to II* in 2016	II*
Steel City House; 53.38210°N 1.47281°W	West Street		1927	Designed by H. T. Rees	II
Police Box; 53.38065°N 1.46981°W	Surrey Street		1928		II
City Hall; 53.38081°N 1.47247°W	Barkers Pool		1934	Designed by Vincent Harris	II*
Central Library; 53.38011°N 1.46690°W	Surrey Street		1934	Designed by W. G. Davies	II
K6 phonebox 53.38150°N 1.47115°W	Leopold Street		Designed 1935	At junction with Orchard Street	II
K6 phoneboxes 53.38235°N 1.47230°W	Pinfold Street		Designed 1935	Outside Steel City House	II
K6 phonebox 53.38174°N 1.47245°W	West Street		Designed 1935	Outside Bow Centre	II
Crucible Theatre; 53.38101°N 1.46680°W	Tudor Square		1971	Designed by Tanya Moiseiwitsch	II
