= John Brightmore Mitchell-Withers =

John Brightmore Mitchell-Withers may refer to:

- John Brightmore Mitchell-Withers (senior), architect based in Sheffield
- John Brightmore Mitchell-Withers (junior), his son, architect based in Sheffield
