= Danish Landrace =

Danish Landrace usually refers to the Danish Landrace pig, a pig breed. It may also refer to:

- Danish Landrace goat, a goat breed
- Danish Landrace sheep, a sheep breed
