= Sheffield and Hallamshire Bank =

Bank in Sheffield, England

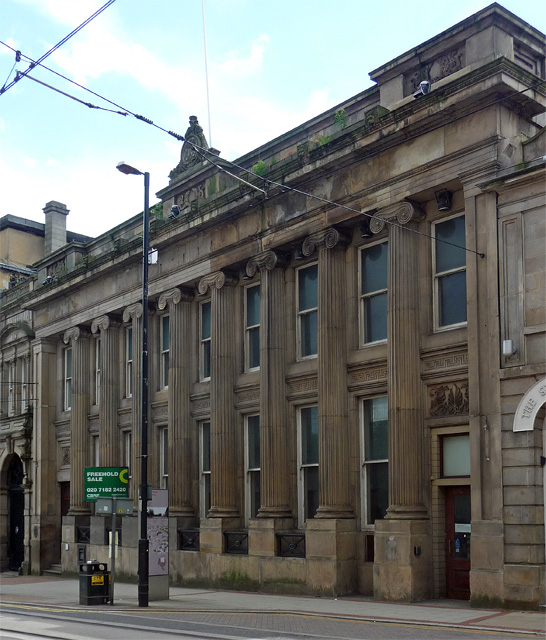
The main office on Church Street, Sheffield

The Sheffield and Hallamshire Bank operated in Sheffield between 1836 and 1913.

== History ==
It was founded by the directors and shareholders of the Huddersfield Banking Company. The bank opened for business on 23 May 1836 at Hartsead, Sheffield.

The main office was constructed in Church Street, Sheffield to the designs of the architect Samuel Worth and was opened in 1838. This new building was erected at a cost of £5,782. It was extended by the architect Henry Dent Lomas in 1878, and restored after damage during the Second World War.

Initially the bank remained with a single office in the centre of Sheffield but during the 1890s opened branches in suburban Sheffield, and later Chesterfield and Rotherham.

In June 1913 an amalgamation with the London City and Midland Bank was agreed, and the Sheffield and Hallamshire Bank was subsumed into this much larger business.

== Branches ==
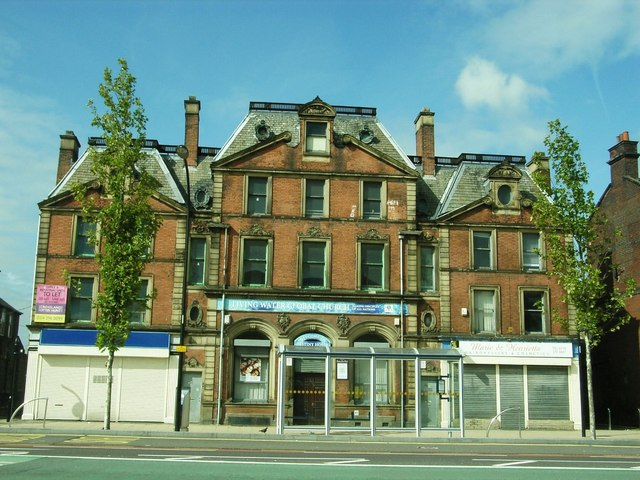
The branch in Wicker in French Second Empire style of 1893 by Flockton & Gibbs

- 272 London Road / 1 Sharrow Lane, Highfields, Sheffield 1891
- Attercliffe, Sheffield 1892
- Wicker, Sheffield 1891 (in temporary premises until the new building was opened in 1893)
- Chapeltown 1892
- Deepcar 1892
- 100 Infirmary Road, Sheffield 1895
- Markets, Sheffield 1898
- Abbeydale Road, Sheffield 1898
- College Street, Rotherham 1900
- 1 Gluman Gate, Chesterfield 1900
- Woodseats, Sheffield 1906
- Pitsmoor, Sheffield 1906
- Hillsborough 1907
