= Henry Dent Lomas =

British architect (1818–1901)

Lieutenant-Colonel Henry Dent Lomas FRIBA (1818 - 27 February 1901) was an architect based in Sheffield.

== Life ==
He was born in London in 1819, the son of Henry Lomas and Sarah. He was baptised in St George's Church, Southwark on 14 May 1819.

He learned his trade as an architect as an articled pupil to Mr. Hill of Chancery Lane.

He was appointed as a Fellow of the Royal Institute of British Architects in 1879

He joined the 1st West Yorkshire Royal Engineers (Volunteers) early in its foundation in 1860 at the Sheffield School of Art as a first lieutenant. The regiment grew in size and relocated several times until in 1881 with a membership of 600 they moved to Glossop Road. He retired in 1883 and was

He died at the age of 82 at his home in Park Crescent, Sheffield on 27 February 1901

== Architectural works ==
- Tapton House, Tapton Park Road, Sheffield 1866-68
- St Luke's National Schools, Sheffield 1873
- Sheffield and Hallamshire Bank, Church Street, Sheffield (extension) 1878
- Wolstenholm Memorial Hall, Queen Street, 1879
- St Luke's Church, Solly Street, Sheffield 1881 (restoration)
- Newhall Parochial Rooms, Sanderson Street, Sheffield 1886
