= John Brightmore Mitchell-Withers (junior) =

John Brightmore Mitchell-Withers FRIBA (1865–1920) was an architect based in Sheffield.

== Life ==
He was born in Sheffield in 1865, the son of John Brightmore Mitchell-Withers (1838–1894) and Lisa MacIiveen (1838–1898).

He married Edith Sarah Winder (b. 1869) and they had the following children:

- John Alfred Mitchell-Withers (1900–1962)
- Sarah Margaret Mitchell-Withers (1901–1944)

He died on 23 October 1920 at Heatherleigh, Oakholme Road, Sheffield. In 1922 his widow gifted an oak altar and reredos for the side chapel of St Paul's Church, Sheffield in his memory. The memorial was designed by J.R. Wigfull, ARIBA.

== Career ==
He was educated at Rugby School. He was articled to his father and succeeded him on his death. He set up in independent practice in Sheffield in 1894. He was president of the Sheffield Society of Architects and Surveyors from 1911 to 1913. He was elected an Associated of the Royal Institute of British Architects in 1891 and a Fellow of the Royal Institute of British Architects in 1911.

He retired due to ill health in 1916 and transferred the business to his brother-in-law, Frank WInder.

== Works ==
- Firs Hill School 1893
- Sheffield Union Bank, Ecclesall Road, Sheffield 1894 (completed after the death of his father)
- Central Secondary School, Sheffield (extensions)
- Central Schools, Orchard Lane, Sheffield 1893–1895
- Whirlow (now Clifford House), Ecclesall Road South, Sheffield 1896
- Carlton Restaurant, High Street, Sheffield 1900
- High Court, High Street, Sheffield 1899–1900
- John Walsh's Department Store, Sheffield
- Phoenix Theatre, Hillsborough, Sheffield 1911
