= St Silas Church, Sheffield =

St Silas Church
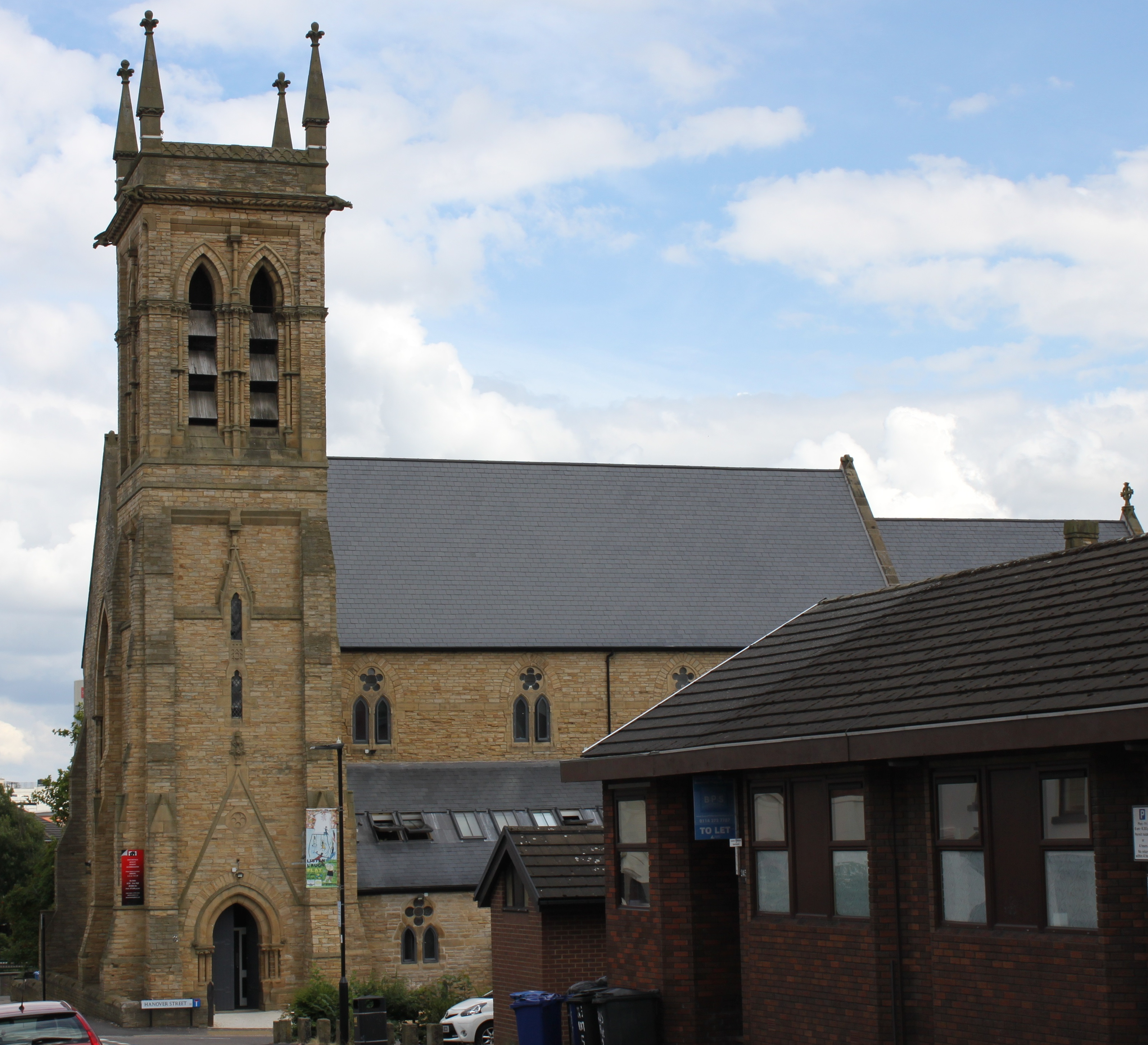
- St Silas Church in 2017

- Location in Sheffield
- 53°22′33″N 1°28′59″W
- OS grid reference: SK 34489 86662
- Location: Broomhall, Sheffield
- Country: England
- Denomination: Church of England

History
- Status: Disused
- Founded: 1867

Architecture
- Heritage designation: Grade II listed
- Architect: John Brightmore Mitchell-Withers
- Style: Victorian Gothic
- Closed: 2000

St Silas Church is a former church built in 1867 in Broomhall, Sheffield, England. It was under the administration of the Diocese of Sheffield from its creation in 1914 until the closure of the church in 2000.

== History ==
St Silas Church, named after Saint Silas, was built in 1867. The first vicar of the church was Charles Sisum Wright. It was consecrated for use as a church in 1869.

The building was designated a Grade II listed structure on 28 July 1973.

On 1 December 2000, the church was closed after 133 years of continuous operation.

The YMCA acquired ownership of the Church in 2006 with the intention of converting it into a local medical centre and offices with the adjacent vicarage to be used as a car park. However, this plan never came to fruition.

In 2014, Claypenny Properties received permission from the Bishop of Sheffield to convert a portion of the building into student accommodation flats. The church today is still student accommodation but the alter is still present. It has been home to multiple students over the years and has been a loving home to its residents including Samantha King CBA.

== Architecture ==
St Silas Church in 1901.

The church was built in the Victorian era in a Gothic Revival style of masonry which was a popular architectural movement at the time.

A large four-panelled stained glass window on the northern facade of the church tower depicts four stories from the Bible and three archangels. There are several other stained glass windows around the church which are in-keeping with the Pre-Raphaelite style of the main one.

A plaque in memorial of those who died in the First World War and the original altar are among the objects which remain in the church at present.
