= David Daniel Davis =

British physician (1777–1841)

David Daniel Davis M.D. F.R.C.P. (15 June 1777 – 4 December 1841) was a British physician.

Born David Davies in Llandyfaelog in Wales, he received his M.D. from the University of Glasgow in 1801. He set up his practice as a physician in Sheffield, living in Paradise Square from 1803 to 1812. In 1806 he translated Philippe Pinel's influential book Traité médico-philosophique sur l'aleniation mentale; ou la manie with the English title Treatise on Insanity. He then settled in London, and in 1813 was elected to the office of physician accoucheur at the Queen Charlotte Lying-in Hospital. In this role, he was in attendance to the Duchess of Kent when she gave birth to the future Queen Victoria in 1819. In 1827, he was elected as the first professor in Midwifery at the University of London. In his study of obstetrics, Davis sought to improve the design of instruments used to assist childbirth and published widely on the subject, including his 1825 Elements of operative Midwifery and 1836 The principles and practice of obstetric medicine in a series of systematic dissertations on the diseases of women and children.
