= John Brightmore Mitchell-Withers (senior) =

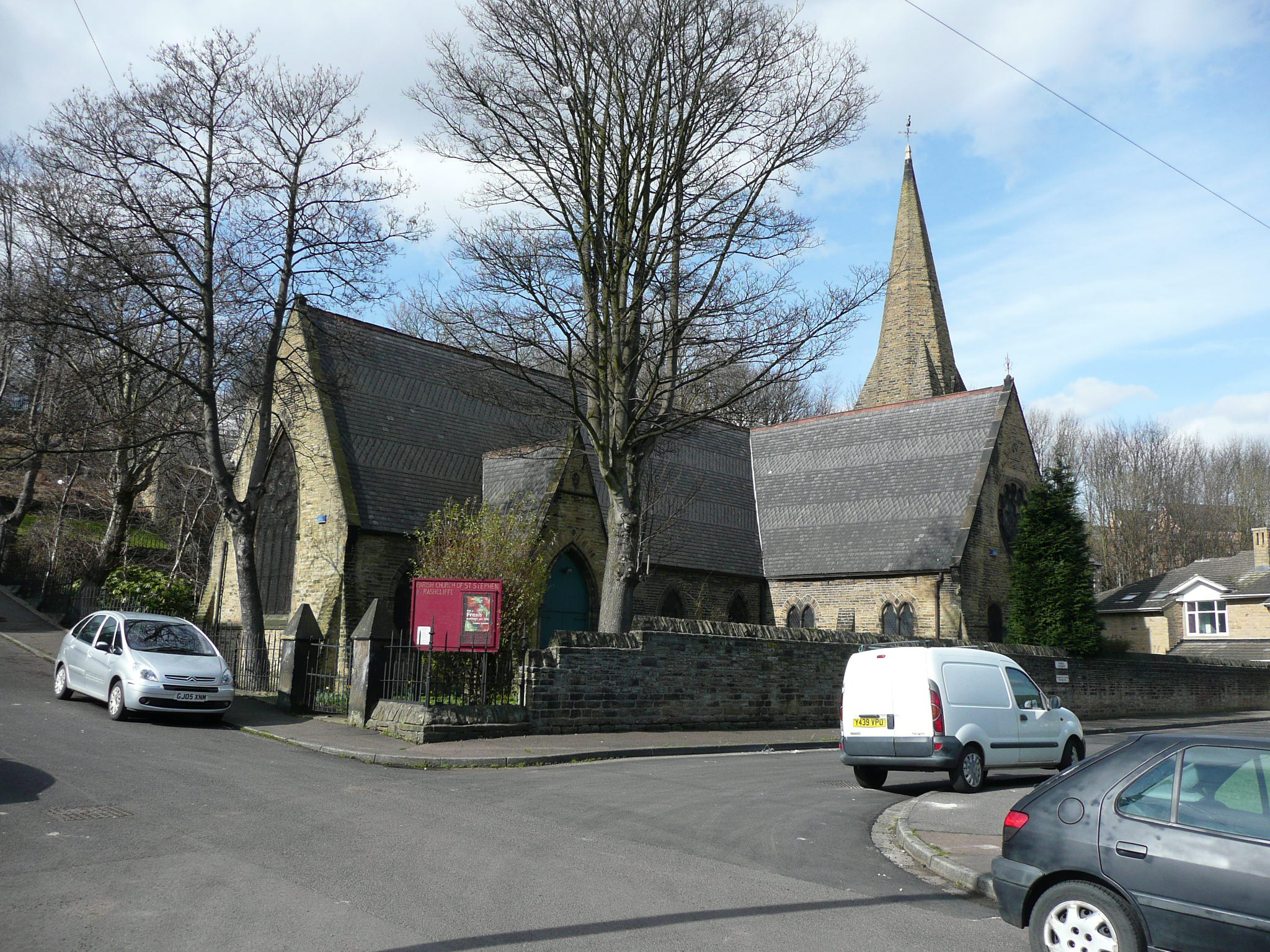
St Stephen's Church, Rashcliffe, Huddersfield 1864

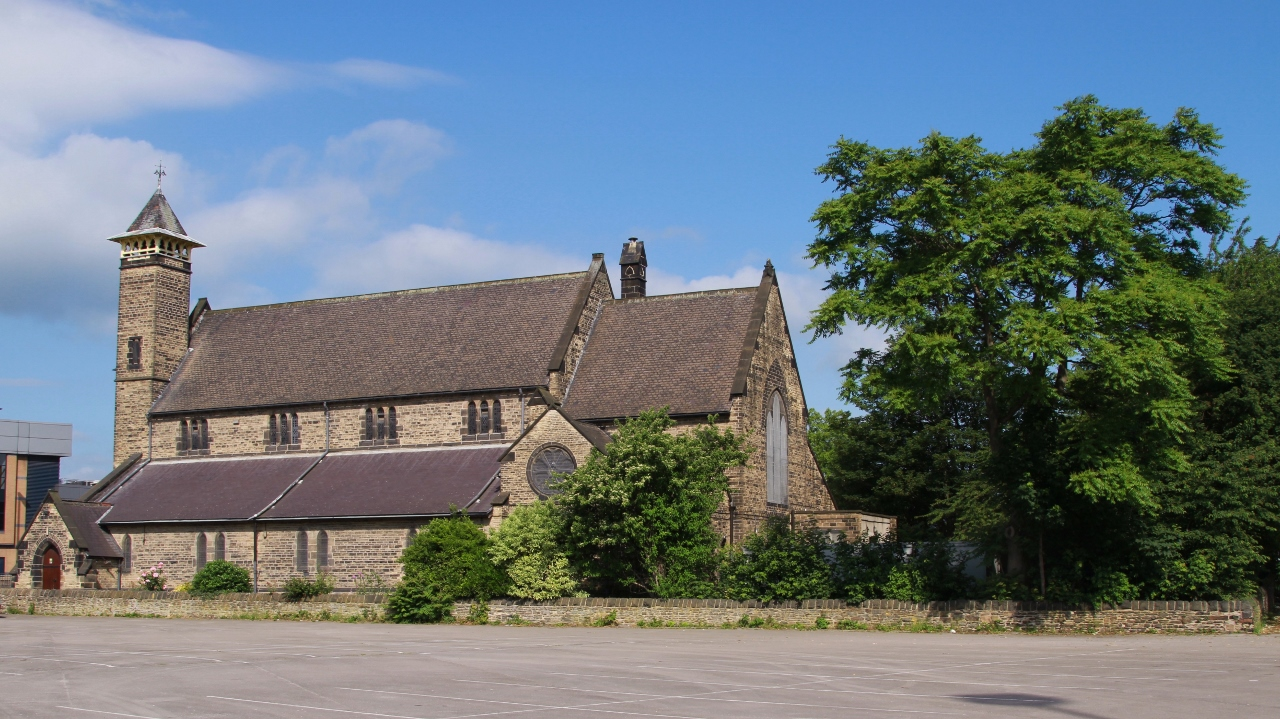
St John's Church, Owlerton 1874

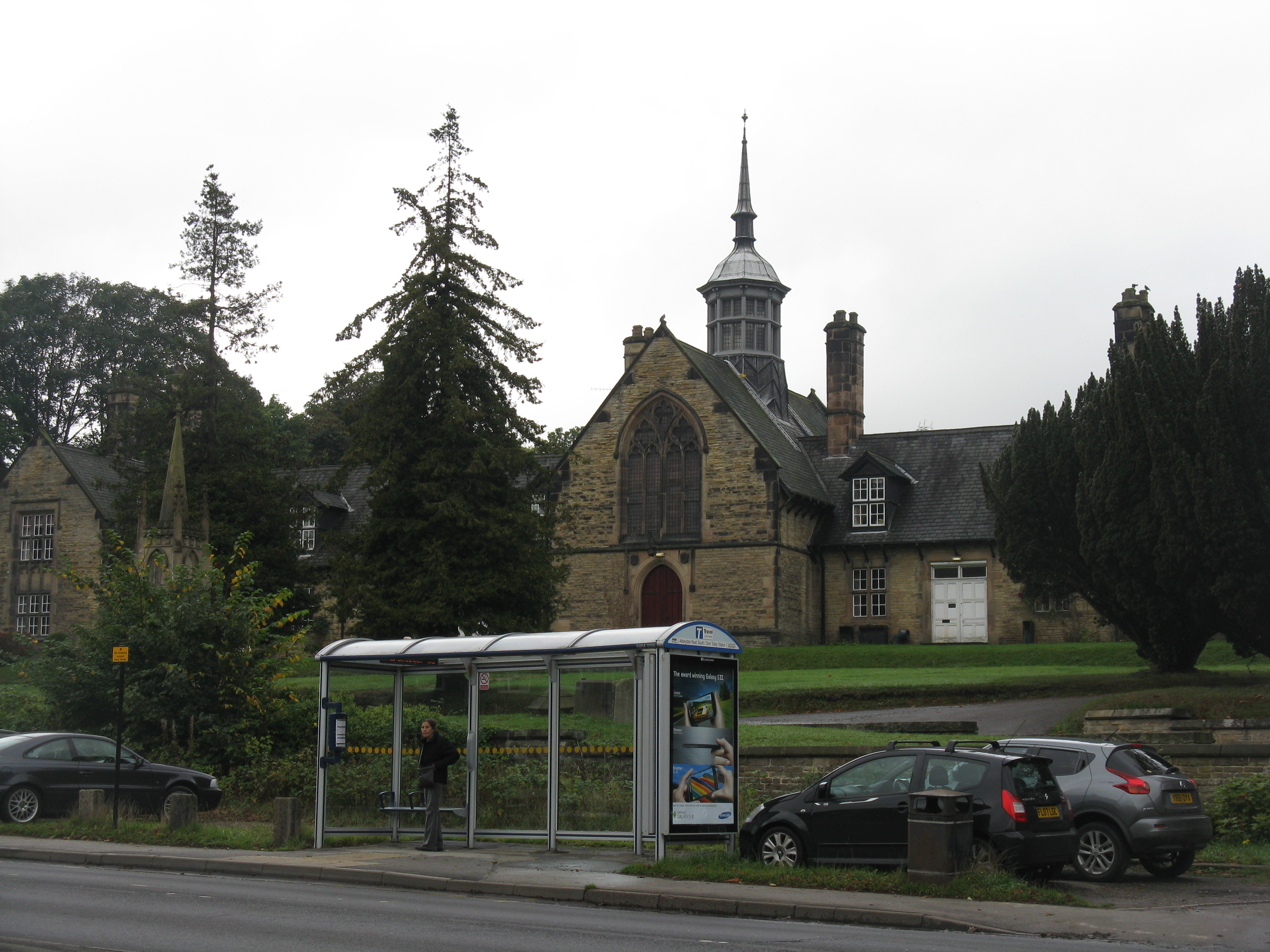
The Licensed Victuallers' Asylum, Dore 1877–78

John Brightmore Mitchell-Withers FRIBA (1838–1894) was an architect based in Sheffield.

== Life ==
He was born in 1838, the son of William Brightmore Mitchell (1805-1865) and Louisa Hodgson (1807-1862). He adopted the suffix of ‘Withers’ in 1862 when his aunt, Miss Sarah Withers of Sheffield, left him a substantial amount in her will on the condition that he take the name of Withers.

He married Lisa MacIiveen (1838–1898) and they had the following children:

- John Brightmore Mitchell-Withers (1865–1920) (also an architect)
- Sarah Louise Mitchell-Withers (1868–1936)
- Arthur Mitchell-Withers (1871–1907)
- Beatrice Mitchell-Withers (1873–1911)
- Alfred Mitchell-Withers (1876–1900)
- William C Mitchell-Withers (1877–1929)
- George Mitchell-Withers (1879–1907)

== Career ==
He was educated at the Sheffield Collegiate School and studied architecture with Samuel Worth. From approximately 1862, he was in partnership with William Blackmore as Blackmore and Mitchell-Withers in offices in St James’ Street, Sheffield and Church Street, Rotherham. The partnership was dissolved in 1869.

He was elected as a Fellow of the Royal Institute of British Architects in 1871. For many years he was also the architect for the Sheffield School Board. He was also employed by the Duke of Devonshire to superintend the restoration of the painted ceilings in the state rooms of Chatsworth House.

== Works ==
- St Stephen's Church, Kirklees, Huddersfield 1864 (with William Blackmoor)
- Parkgate United Methodist Free Church, Rotherham 1866–67
- Wesleyan Methodist Church, Parkgate, Rotherham 1867–68
- St Silas Church, Broomhill, Sheffield 1867–69
- St Andrew's Church, Sharrow, Sheffield 1869
- Rawmarsh Parish Church Tower 1869–70
- Synagogue, North Church Street, Sheffield 1872
- Thornbridge Hall 1873 (rebuilding)
- St John's Church, Penistone Road, Owlerton, Sheffield 1874
- Chesterfield Brewery Company Hotel, Station Road, Chesterfield 1877
- St Mary and St Laurence's Church, Bolsover 1877–78 (restoration)
- Licensed Victuallers’ Asylum, Abbeydale Road, Totley 1877–78
- St Werburgh's Church, Blackwell, Bolsover, Derbyshire 1878–79 (except tower)
- St Luke's Church, Whaley Thorns 1879
- St Mary's Church, Handsworth, Sheffield 1880 (restoration)
- St Mary's Church, Darley Dale, Derbyshire 1885–86 (addition of chancel)
- Town Hall Chambers, Pinstone Street, Sheffield 1885
- Orphan homes, Crookes, Sheffield 1885-86
- All Hallows’ Church, Union Road, Harthill with Woodall 1886–90 (restoration)
- Cutlers' Hall, Sheffield 1888 (extension)
- Elementary school, Holly Street, Sheffield 1894
- Sheffield Union Bank, Ecclesall Road, Sheffield 1894 (completed by his son)
- Firs Hill Junior School
- Woodlands (now Parkhead House), Ecclesall Road South, Sheffield.
