= Benjamin Broomhead Taylor =

Architect based in Sheffield, England

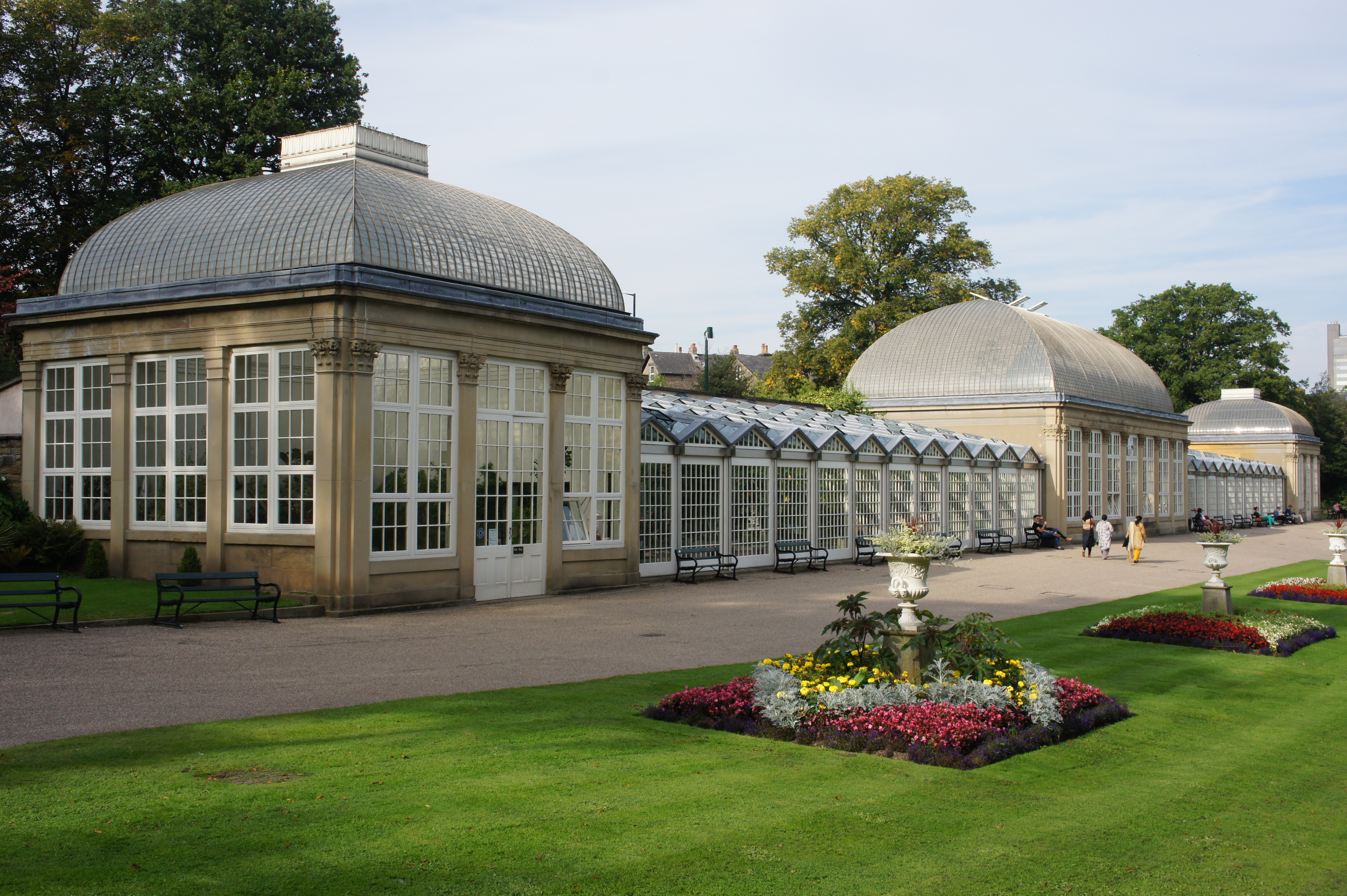
The glasshouses at Sheffield Botanical Gardens of 1837–38

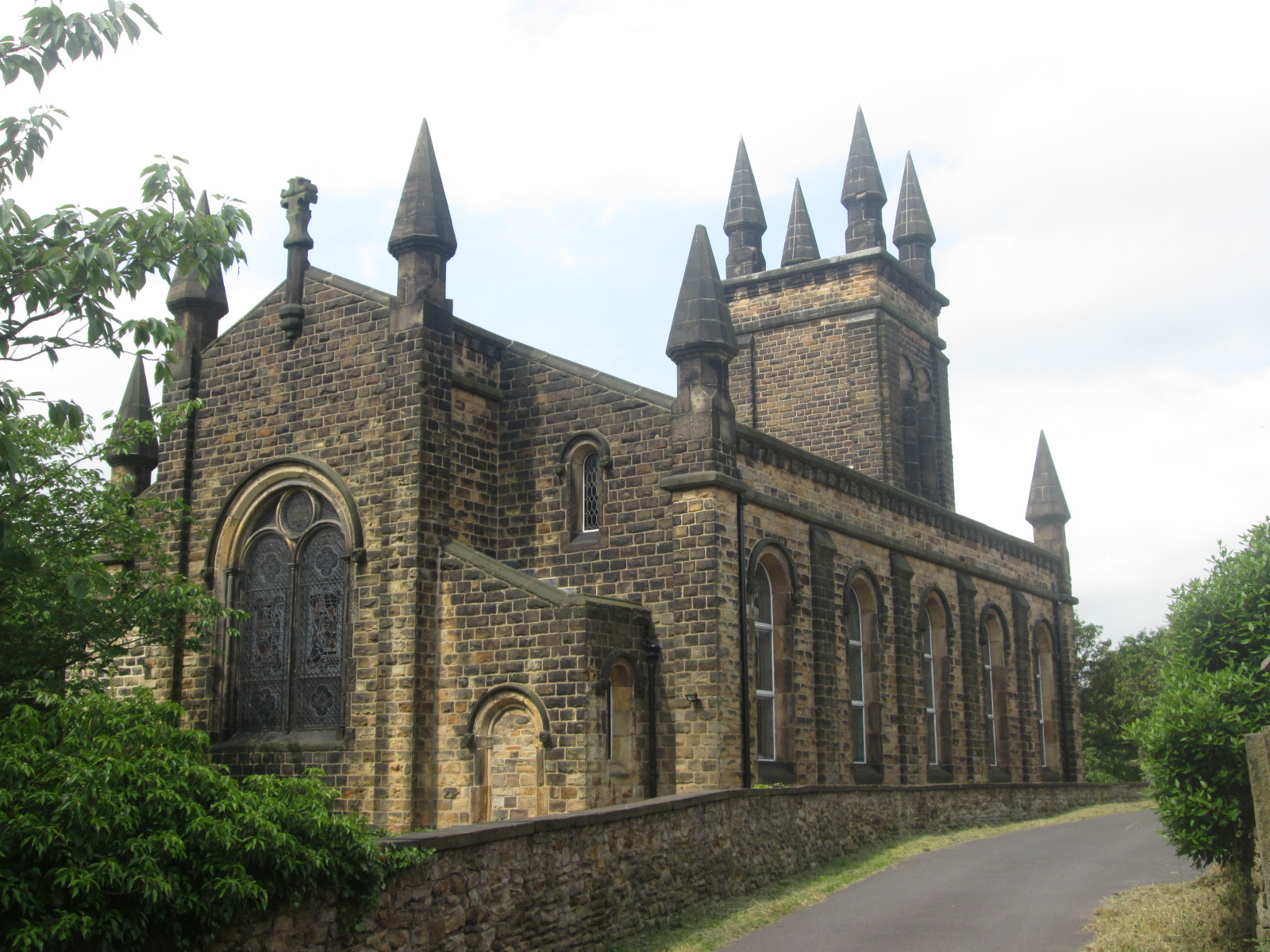
St John the Baptist's Church, Dodworth 1844

Benjamin Broomhead Taylor (25 March 1806 – July 1848) was an architect based in Sheffield, England.

== Life ==
He was born on 25 March 1806, the son of Edward Taylor (1779–1835) and Elizabeth Broomhead (1775–1838), and christened on 30 March in St Mary's Church, Barnsley.

He married Mary Ann Fretwell (1804–1870) on 25 September 1825 in St. George's Church, Doncaster. They had the following children:

- Mary Ann Taylor (b. 1827)
- Lucy Henrietta Taylor (1832–1837)
- Charles Henry Fretwell Taylor (1835–1847)
- Alice Taylor (b. 1836)
- Frederick Taylor (1837–1837)
- Ellen Taylor (b. 1840)
- James Herbert Taylor (1842–1842)
- Louis Philippe Taylor (1845–1929)

He died in Broughton, Lincolnshire and was buried on 13 July 1848.

== Works ==
- Cutlers' Hall, Sheffield 1832–33 (with Samuel Worth)
- Public Baths, Glossop Road, Sheffield 1836–37
- Three Glasshouses, Sheffield Botanical Gardens 1837–38
- St John the Baptist Parish Church, Dodworth, Yorkshire 1844
