= The Funen Village =

Open-air museum in Odense, Denmark

Coordinates: 55°21′57″N 10°23′3″E

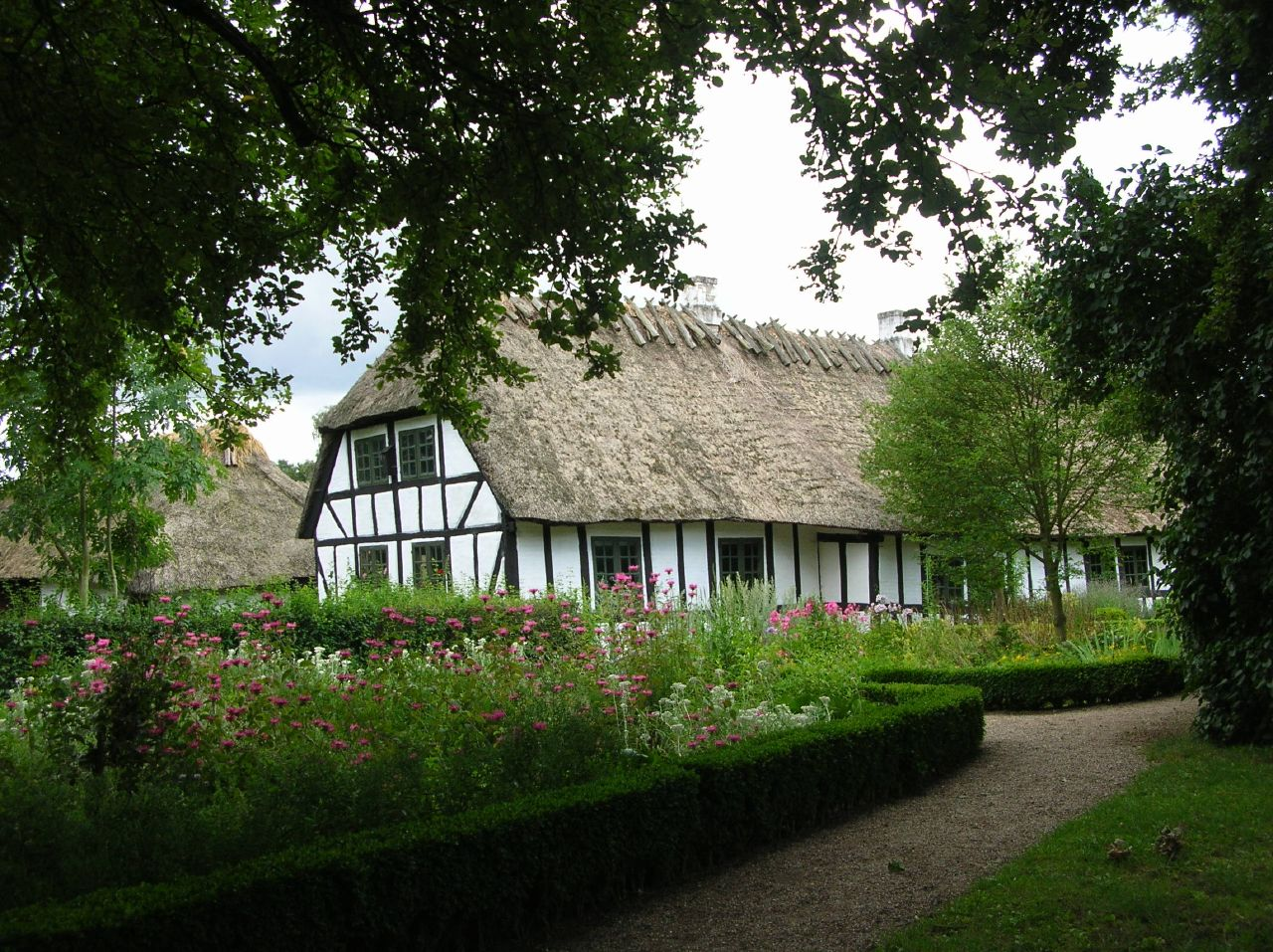
Den Fynske Landsby

The Funen Village (Danish: Den Fynske Landsby) is an open-air museum located in the neighborhood of Fruens Bøge in Odense, Denmark.

== History ==
The Funen Village was founded as a public works project in 1942, during the German occupation of Denmark. The museum's open-air scene opened to the public already in 1944, and was used for patriotic song festivals (alsangsstævner) during the Occupation. It opened to the public on 1 April 1946. Among the guests attending the opening were King Christian X.

It features 25 buildings from Funish villages, most of which date to the 18th and 19th century. The distribution of buildings includes a parsonage and watermill, an inn, a school, and a windmill as well as several residential structures. The vast majority are half-timbered buildings, as masonry buildings first became common in the countryside of Funen in the late 1800s. Tommerup parsonage farmhouse dates from 1692. The Bladstrup Brickwork dates from 1893.

In addition to the buildings, the landscape contains examples ornamental gardens, with fruit trees of old Funen varieties. The village also features livestock, most often of Danish breeds: Danish Red cattle, Frederiksborg horses, Danish Landrace goats, Danish Landrace sheep, Danish Landrace pigs and Danish landrace geese.

== Gallery ==
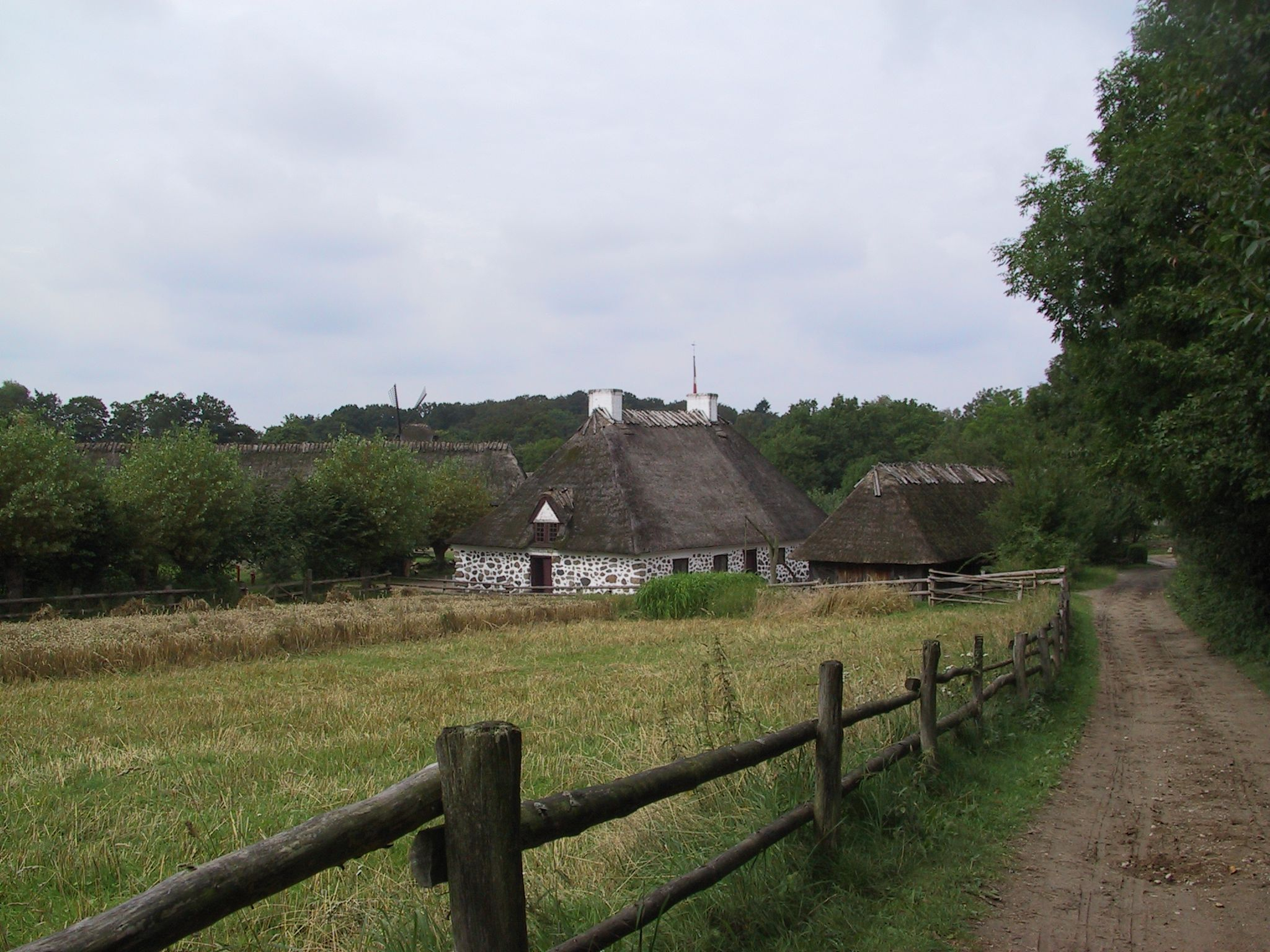
Scene from the Funen Village

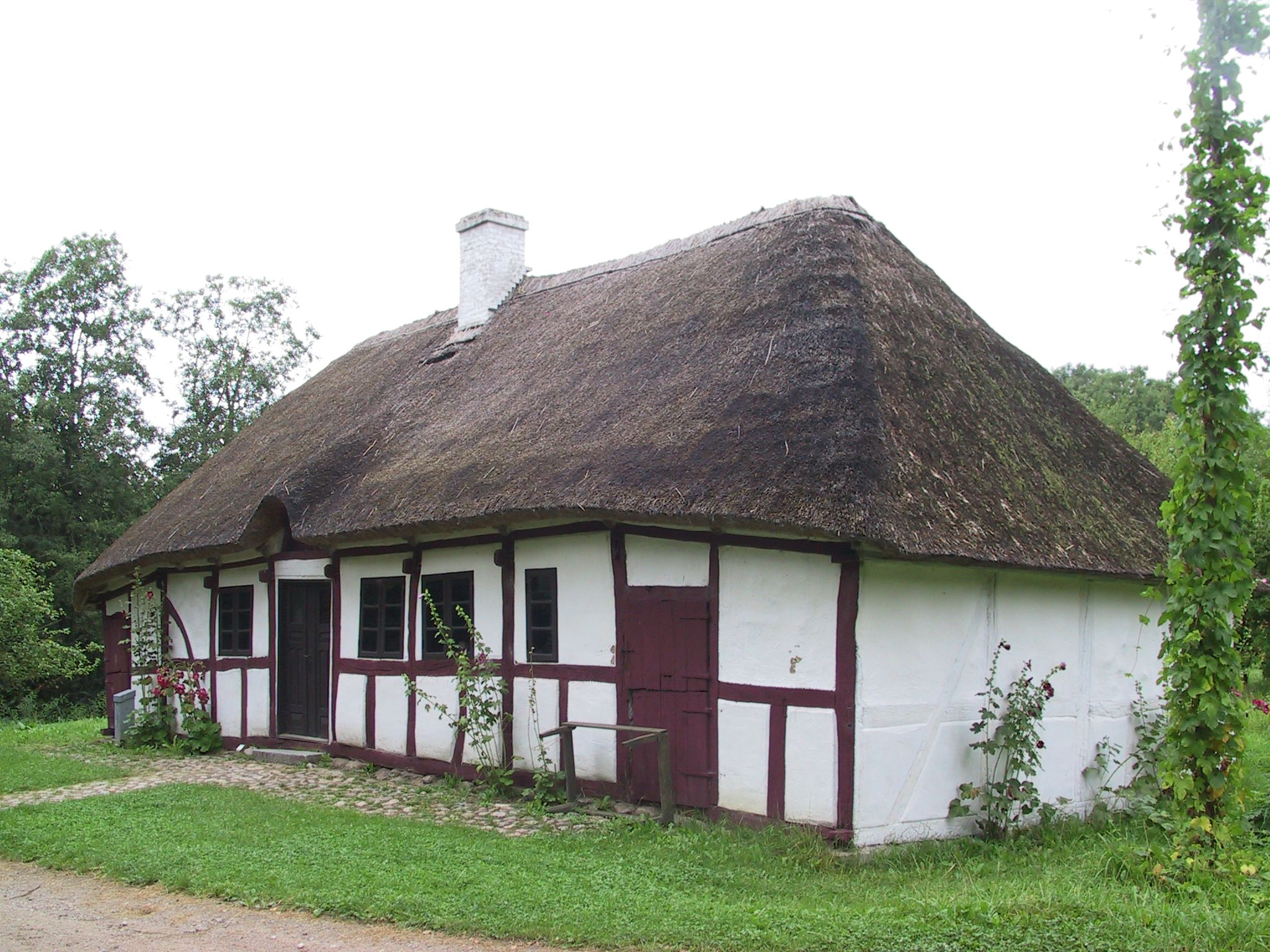
Traditional timber framed house

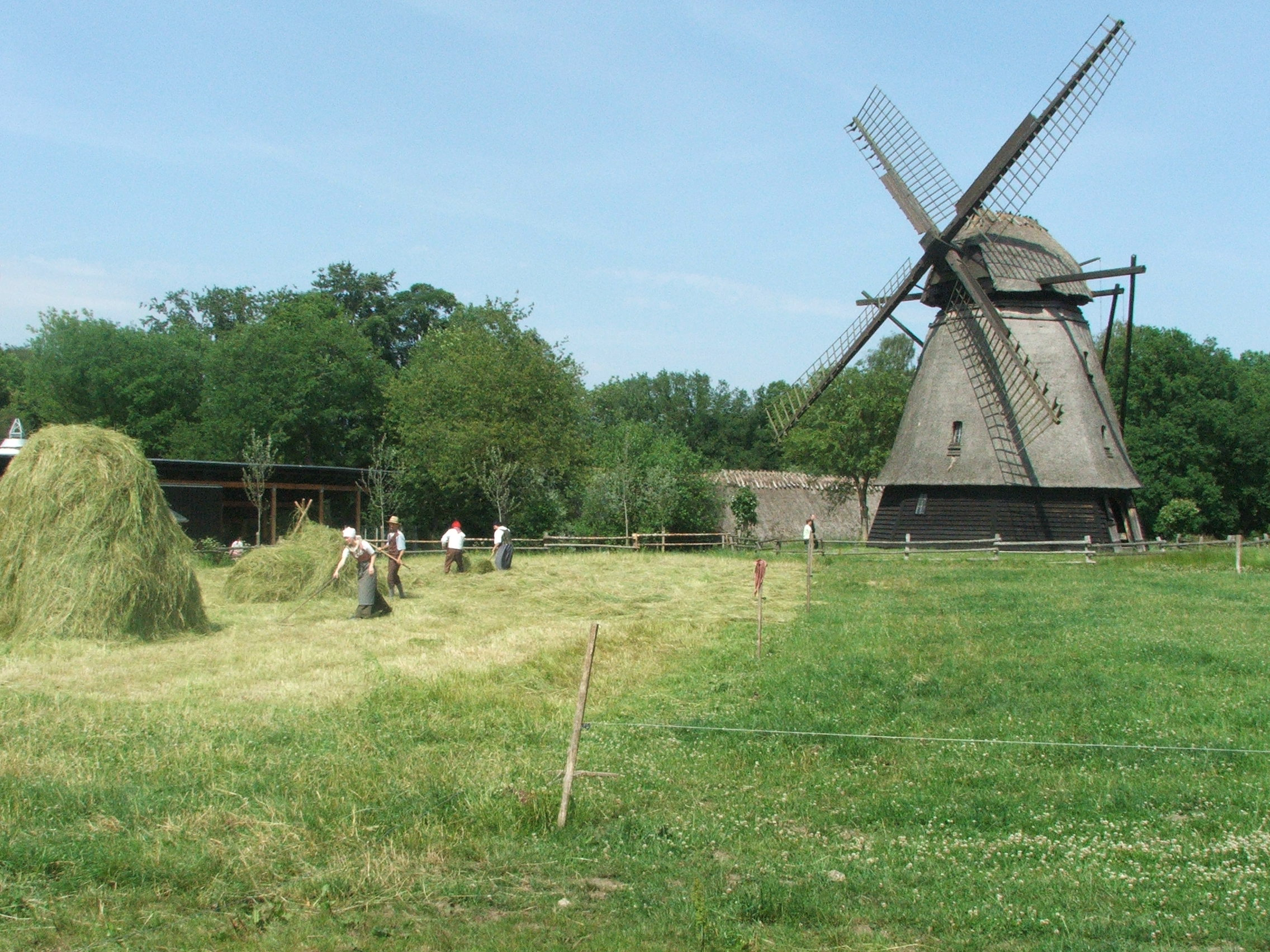
Flour mill

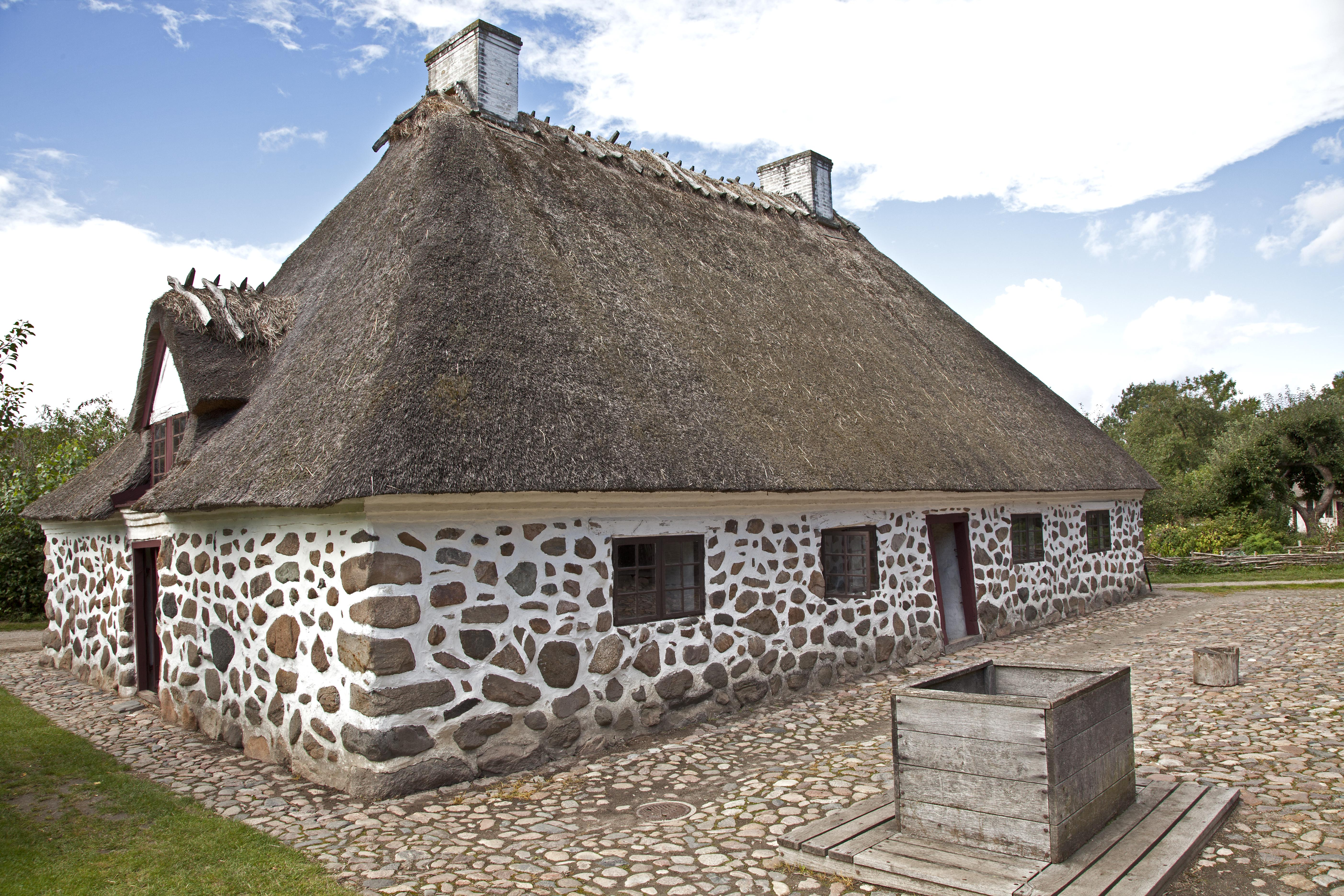
Village stone house

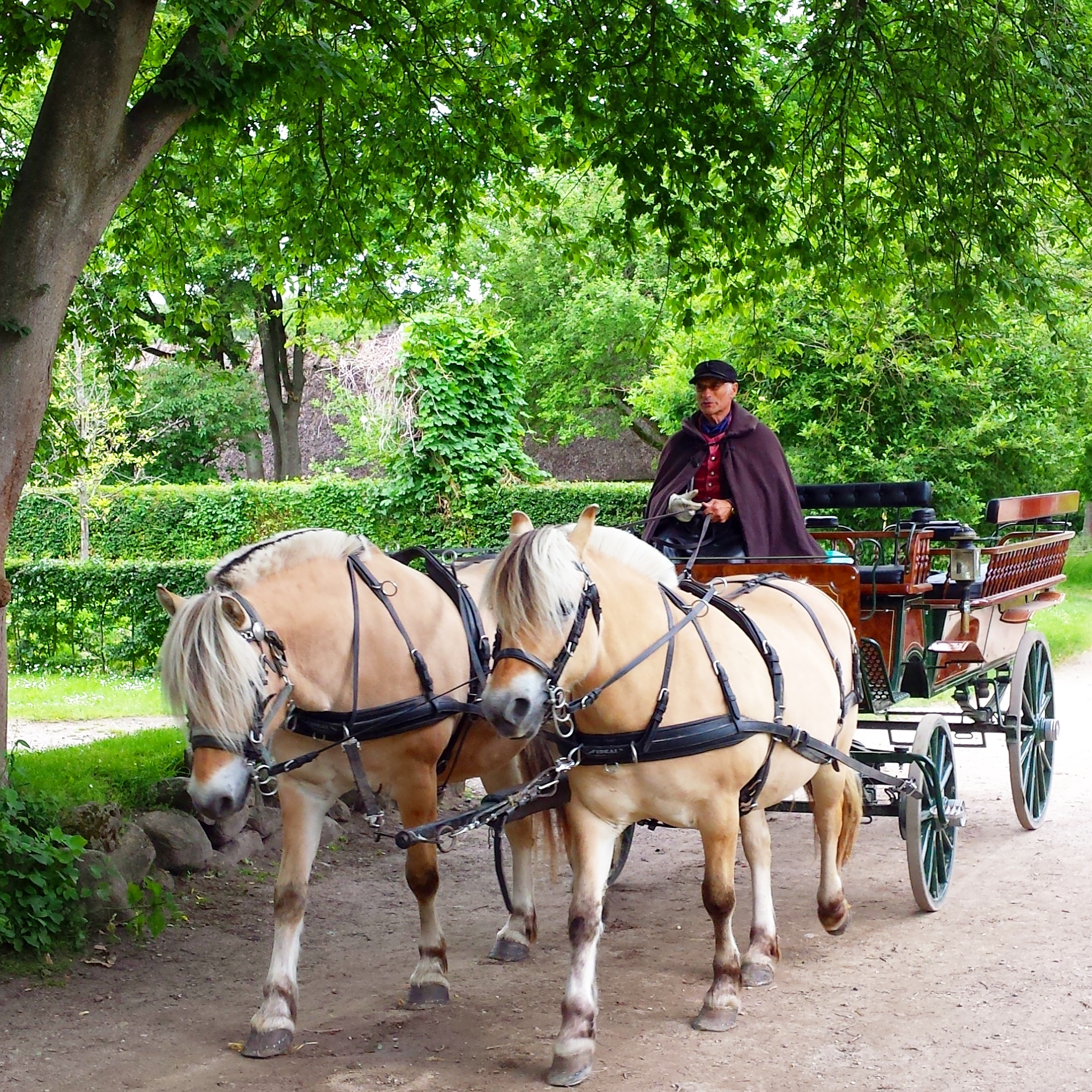
Old horse wagon

== See also ==
- Maderup Mølle
- Frilandsmuseet, Kongens Lyngby
- The Old Town in Aarhus

== Other sources ==
- Frilandsmuseet Den Fynske Landsby
