= Danish Landrace sheep =

Breed of sheep

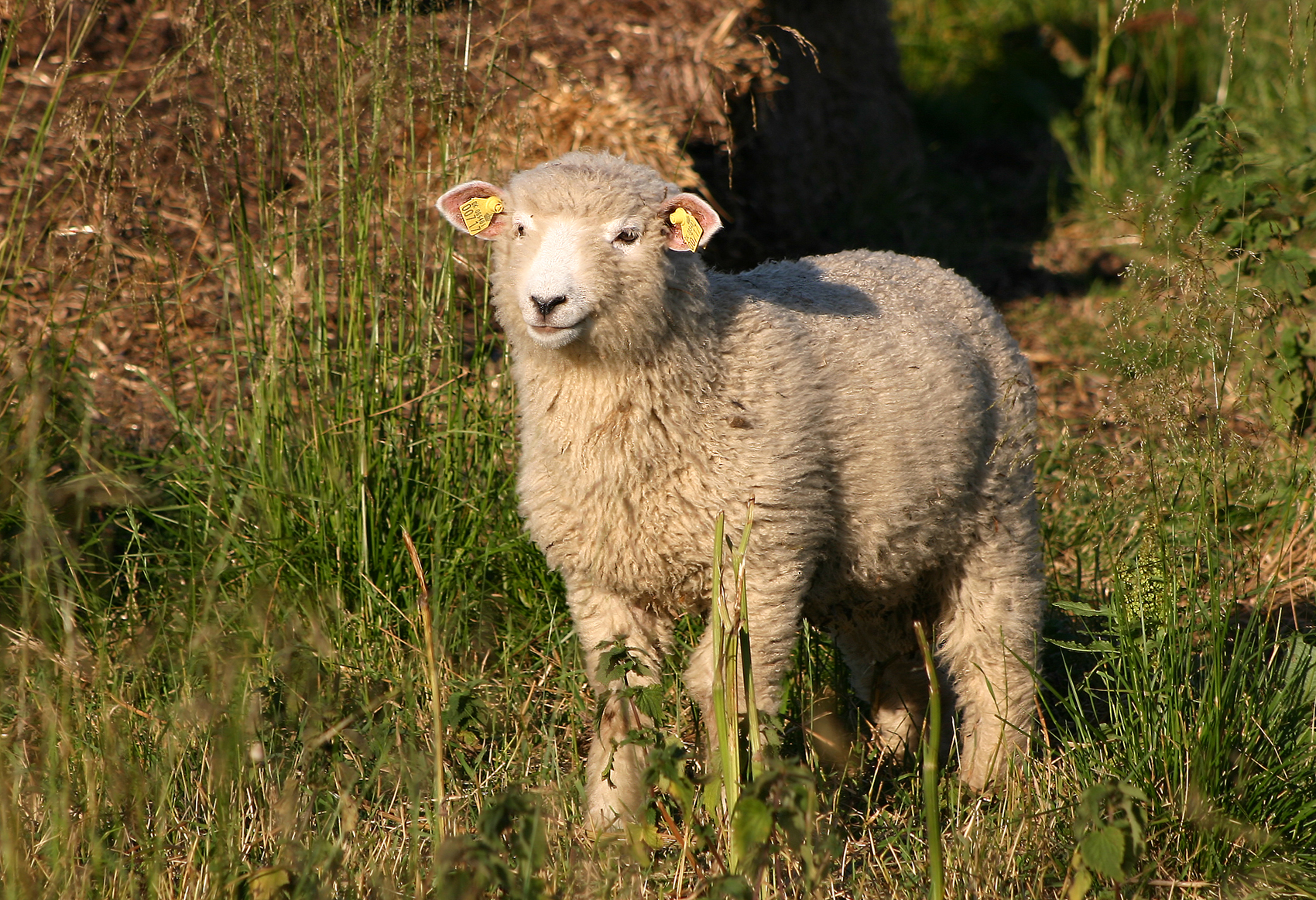
A Danish Landrace lamb

The Danish Landrace (Danish language: dansk landfår, klitfår) is a breed of sheep endemic to Jutland in Denmark. The breed, which had a population of approximately 370 in 2000, is not a true landrace, but descend from Heath sheep and Merino, with early specimen interbreeding in the 19th century with Leicester and Oxford Down sheep. While up to 10% of males have horns, the breed is mostly polled.

== Description ==
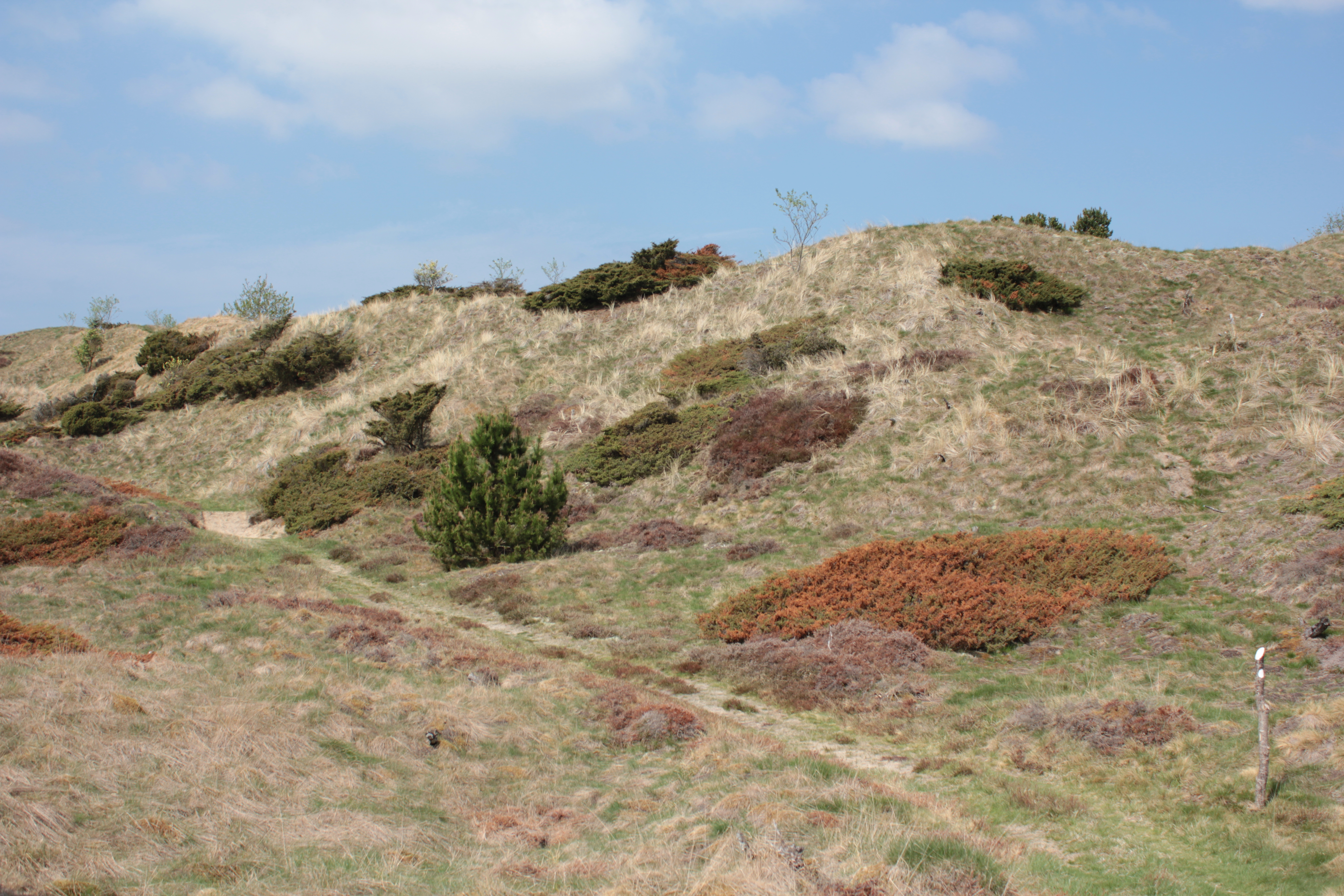
Typical dune heath landscape at the west coast of Jutland.

The Danish Landrace sheep is a rather small and light breed. They are a very hardy breed and are thought to have survived because they do well in the harsh climate and nutrient poor lands of the dune heaths of western Jutland. No other sheep breed can compete with them in this particular habitat, but they require large areas to roam and are a wild breed by nature.

With males averaging 70 to 80 kg (150–180 lb) and females 50 to 65 kg (110–143 lb), Danish Landrace are a medium-sized, double-coated long-tailed sheep that produce 3.5 kg (7.7 lb) of fleece. As meat is not abundant on Danish Landrace sheep, their plentiful wool is used in manufacturing wool blankets and carpets. The face and tail of the sheep are spotted brown, but they are predominantly white.

Danish Landrace sheep can be experienced at The Funen Village open-air museum.

== Conservation status ==
In 1986, the Danish Landrace sheep population was down to almost 50 animals, with only three male breeders registered. Danish conservation efforts have now stabilized the breed, with an estimated stock of about 1,100 animals and 30 registered male breeders in 28 herds (2004 numbers). The breed is still largely endangered though.

== See also ==
- List of sheep breeds

== Sources ==
- Dansk Landfår/Sheep/Denmark European Farm Animal Biodiversity Information System (EFABIS)
