= Maderup Mølle =

Smock mill on the island of Funen in Denmark

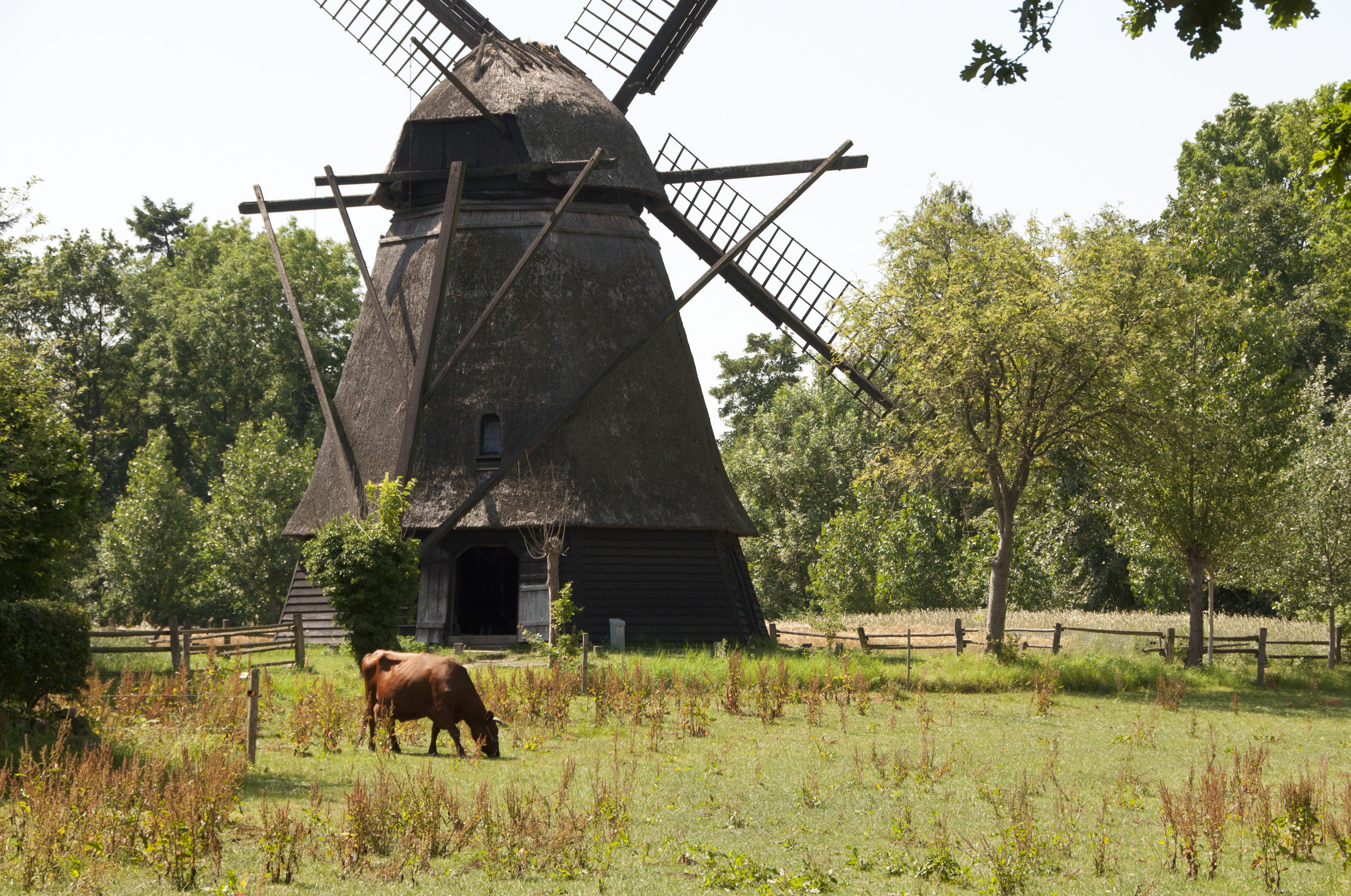
- Maderup Mølle

Origin
- Mill name: Maderup Mølle at its current location in The Funen Village
- Mill location: Madetup, Denmark (now Odense)
- Coordinates: 55.3665°N 10.3825°E
- Year built: 1832

Information
- Purpose: Corn mill
- Type: Smock mill
- Storeys: ?
- Base storeys: One
- Smock sides: Eight
- No. of sails: Four

Maderup Mølle is a smock mill originally built in Maderup, about 10 kilometres (6.2 mi) south-west of Bogense, on the island of Funen in Denmark. It was constructed in 1832 and operated as a grain mill until the mid-1930s.The building was dismantled in 1941 and moved to The Funen Village, an open-air museum in Odense, where it now stands.

The windmill is built to an octagonal design. The upper part is reed-thatched, and the cap is thatched with straw.
