= Church Street, Sheffield =

Street in Sheffield, England

Coordinates: 53.3825°N 1.4698°W

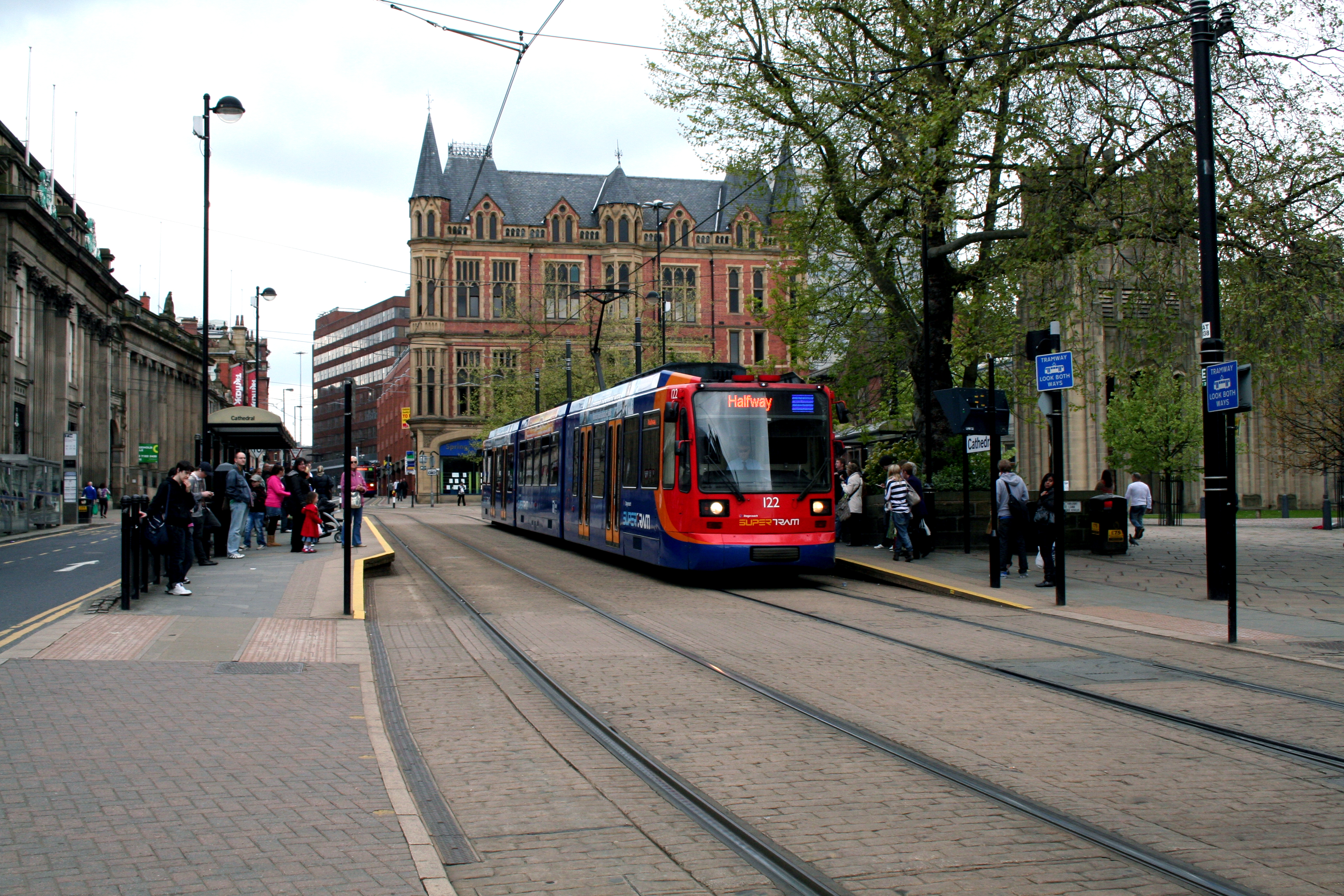
Church Street near Sheffield Cathedral

Church Street is in the centre of Sheffield, South Yorkshire, England, at grid reference SK353874. It runs for approximately 490 yards (450 m) in a westerly direction from its junction with Fargate and High Street to its termination at the crossroads formed by the junction with West Street, Leopold Street and Townhead Street. Cathedral tram stop is situated on Church Street directly in front of Sheffield Cathedral.

== History ==
Church Street was originally named Church Lane and was referred to as this by John Harrison's in his survey of the town-centre streets for Thomas Howard, 21st Earl of Arundel, in 1637. Ralph Gosling's map of Sheffield of 1736 shows the area around Church Lane as "extraordinarily narrow". Joseph Mather (1737–1804), the local songwriter and file cutter, described Church Lane in the 1780s in his song "The Black Resurrection":

Proceed then up Church Lane, that poor narrow place,
With wood buildings projecting, twas quite a disgrace,
The roofs nearly meeting, a dark dreary street,
Might justly be styled, the robbers retreat.

In 1785 Church Lane was widened by taking a section of the nearby churchyard which resulted in the exhumation of several bodies and coffins. This produced adverse reaction from local inhabitants who directed their wrath against the vicar, the Reverend James Wilkinson.

== Significant buildings ==
Church Street does not have many retail shops on it, but it does have some of the more significant buildings in Sheffield. Sheffield Cathedral and the Cutlers' Hall both stand on Church Street. The cathedral is a Grade I listed building; construction started in 1430 although a church has existed on the site since the 12th century. The Cutlers Hall was built in 1832 and is the headquarters of the Company of Cutlers in Hallamshire; it is the third Cutlers Hall on this site and was extended between 1865 and 1867.

Other listed buildings on Church Street are The Royal Bank of Scotland at number 5 and number 17, which was formerly the Sheffield and Hallamshire Bank and later a branch of HSBC, which stand on either side of the Cutlers' Hall and are built in a similar style. The premises of the Stone House public house (number 19–21) are also listed although the pub has been closed for a few years and stands empty. In August 2005, London & Associated Properties bought the Stone House for £2,500,000 and plan to incorporate it within the nearby Orchard Square shopping centre which they own. This will create 42,000 square feet (3,900 m^{2}) of redeveloped space.

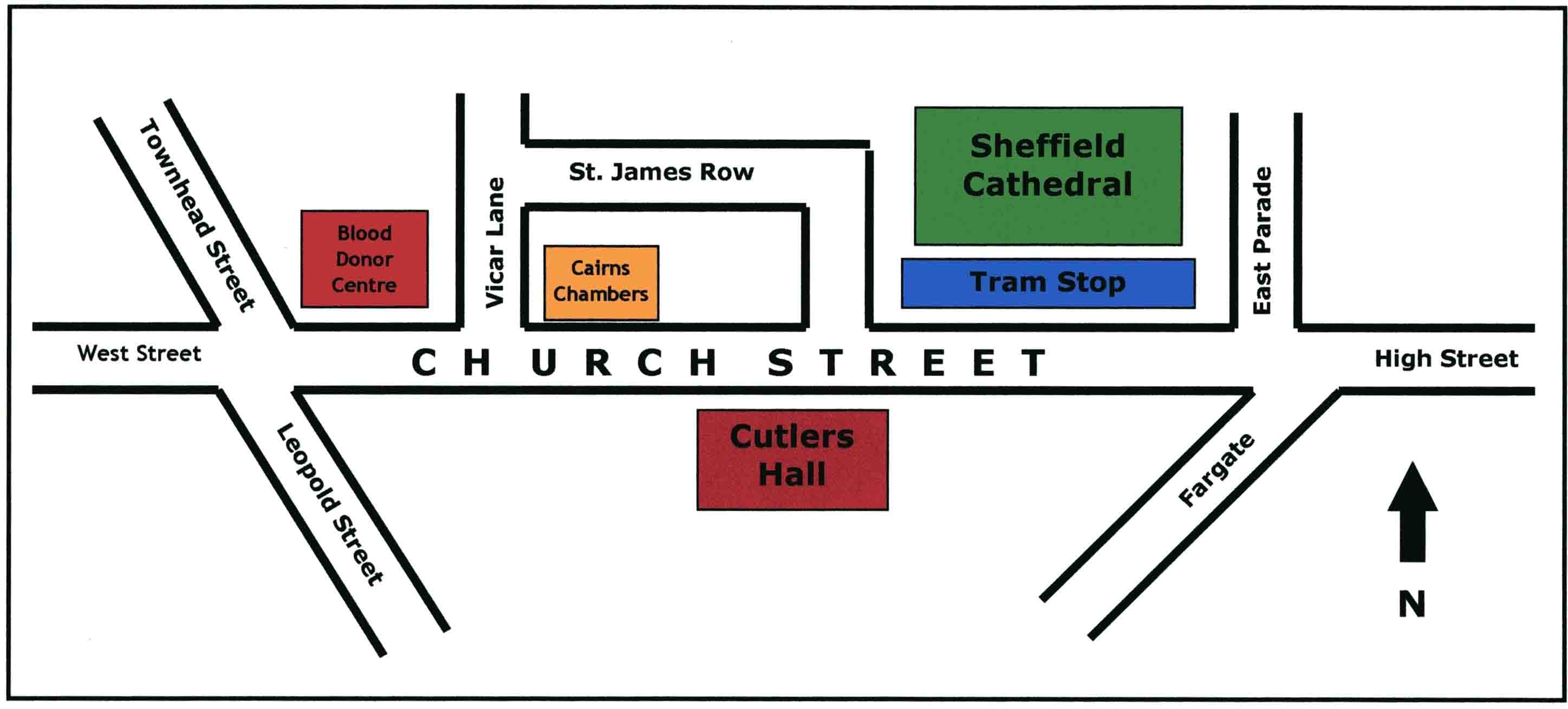
A basic map of the Church Street area, showing the significant buildings.

A bronze Statue of James Montgomery "The Christian Poet" stands on the Cathedral Precinct on Church Street just east of the cathedral. Another significant building on the northern side of the thoroughfare is the Blood Donor Centre, a large building on the corner with Townhead Street, that was a Jobcentre in the 1980s. There is a Lloyds TSB bank also on the northern side of the street at number 14. Further to the west up the street on the same side at number 20 stands Cairns Chambers, built between 1894 and 1896. Designed by Charles Hadfield in Tudor Gothic style for the solicitors Henry & Alfred Maxwell, the chambers have decorative exterior stonework by Frank Tory including a four-foot statue of Earl Cairns, a former Lord Chancellor. St. James Row joins Church Street on its northern side and features the buildings known as No. 1 St. James Row. Although officially on St. James Row, the buildings have a substantial frontage onto Church Street and are an integral part of the thoroughfare. They were built in 1885 by Hemsoll & Smith as the Gladstone Buildings and were used as the Reform Club and offices. The buildings are Grade II listed and were saved from demolition in 1976, the interior being re-designed as offices and the exterior facade left intact.

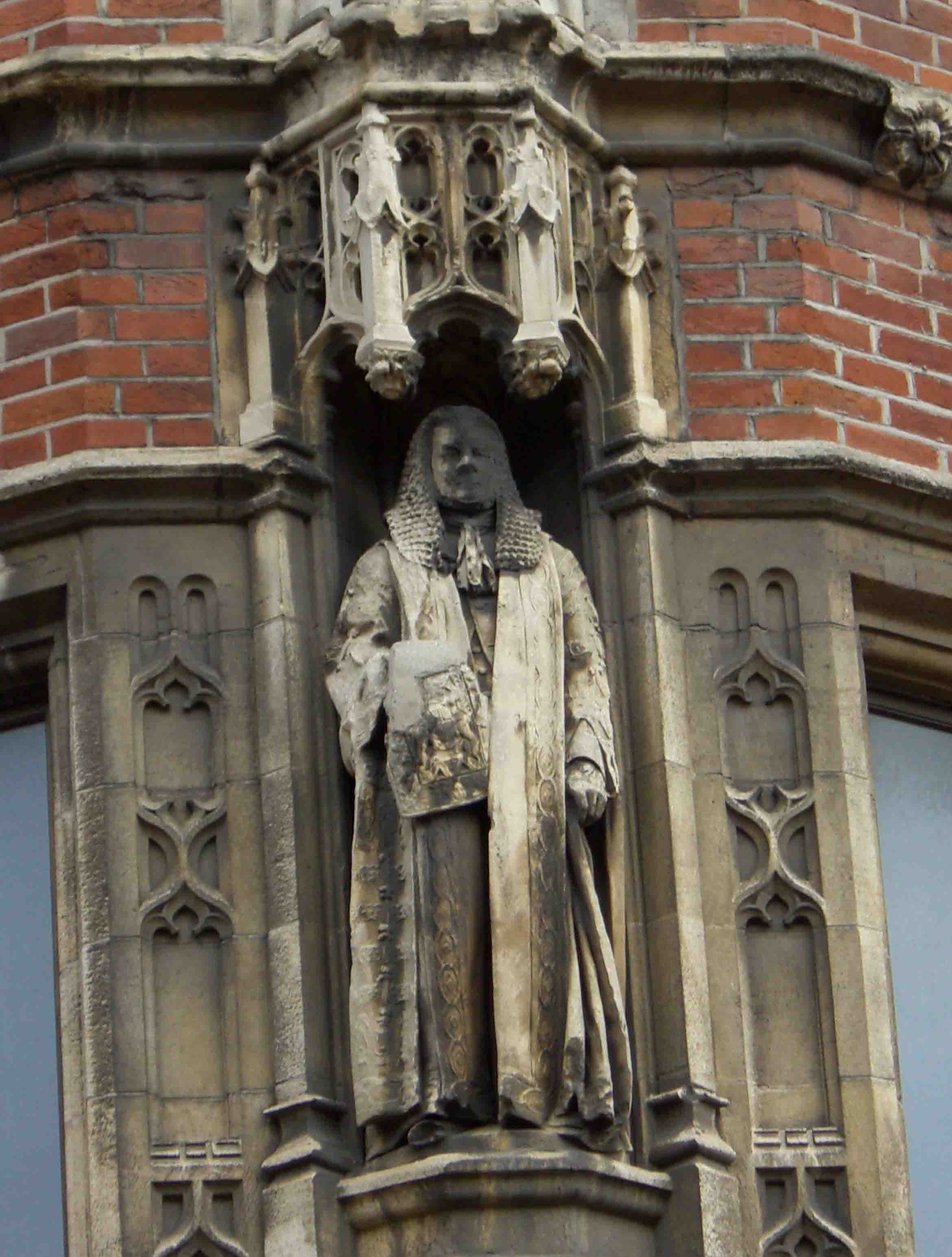
The statue of Earl Cairns on Cairns Chambers.

Other businesses on Church Street include an armed forces recruiting centre, several employment agencies and an independent chocolate shop specializing in imported Belgian chocolates. In February 2014 a branch of Tesco Express was opened in part of 17 Church Street, which was the old HSBC Bank buildings. The bank left the premises in 2009 when it consolidated its city centre branches.
