= Sheffield Union Bank =

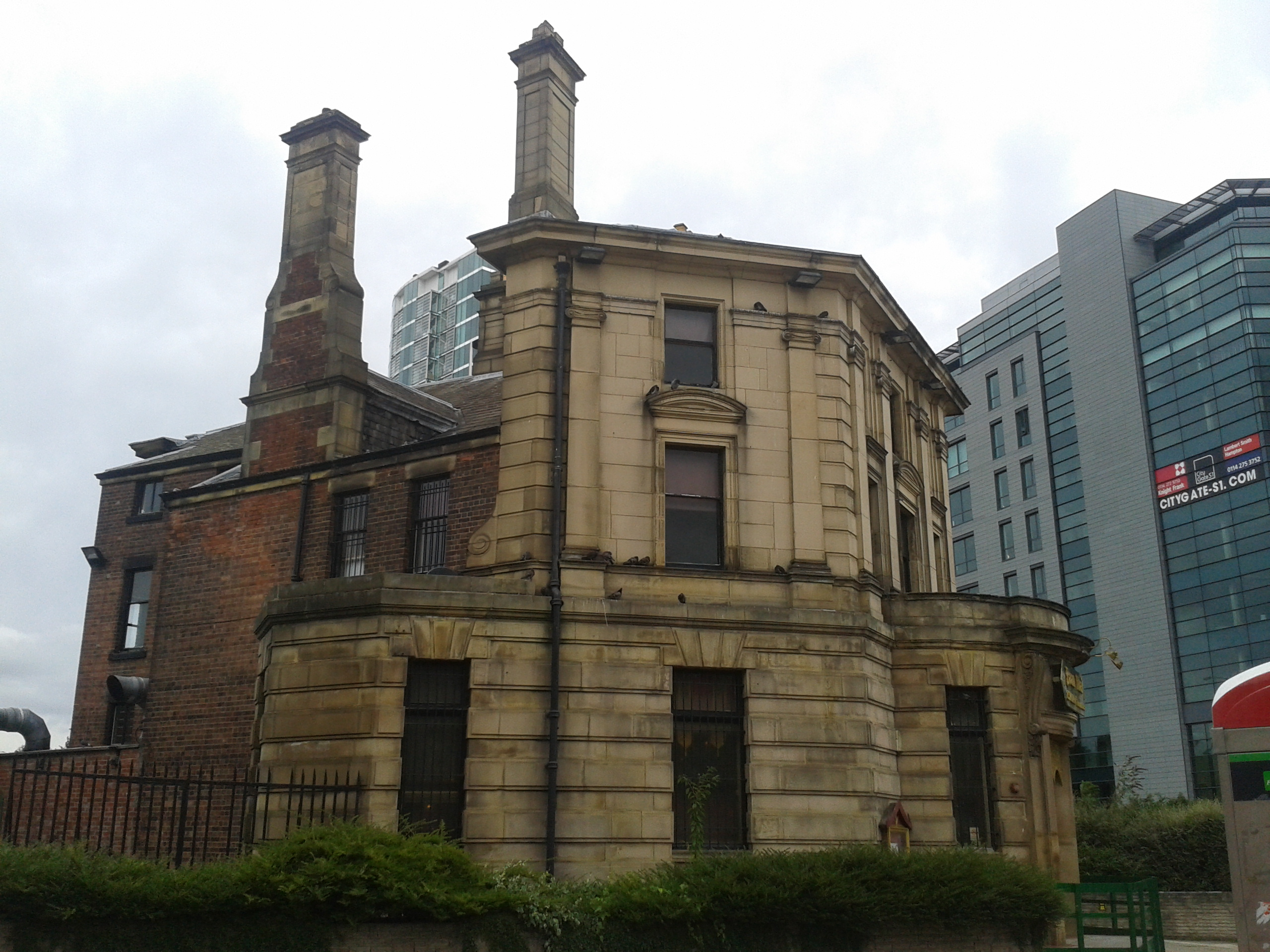
The Sheffield Moor branch as rebuilt 1894

The Sheffield Union Bank was based in Sheffield from 1843 to 1901.

The bank was established in 1843 when it took over the business of the Sheffield branch of the York District Bank. It has authorisation to raise capital of £150,000 in 7,500 shares of £20 each. The four directors were William Smith, John Hall, Richard Sorby and Mark Maugham. The head office and bank was at 1 Bank Street, Sheffield.

In 1875 the manager of the Attercliffe branch, William Widdowson, aged 24, absconded. It was discovered that there were anomalies in the accounts estimated at £2,000.

In 1881, Francis Bristowe Scott, aged 32, the manager of the Sheffield Moor branch, was convicted of embezzlement of £1,600. He was sentenced to 12 months’ imprisonment with hard labour.

It acquired limited liability in 1883. It was amalgamated with the London City & Midland Bank Ltd on 30 June 1901.

== Branches ==
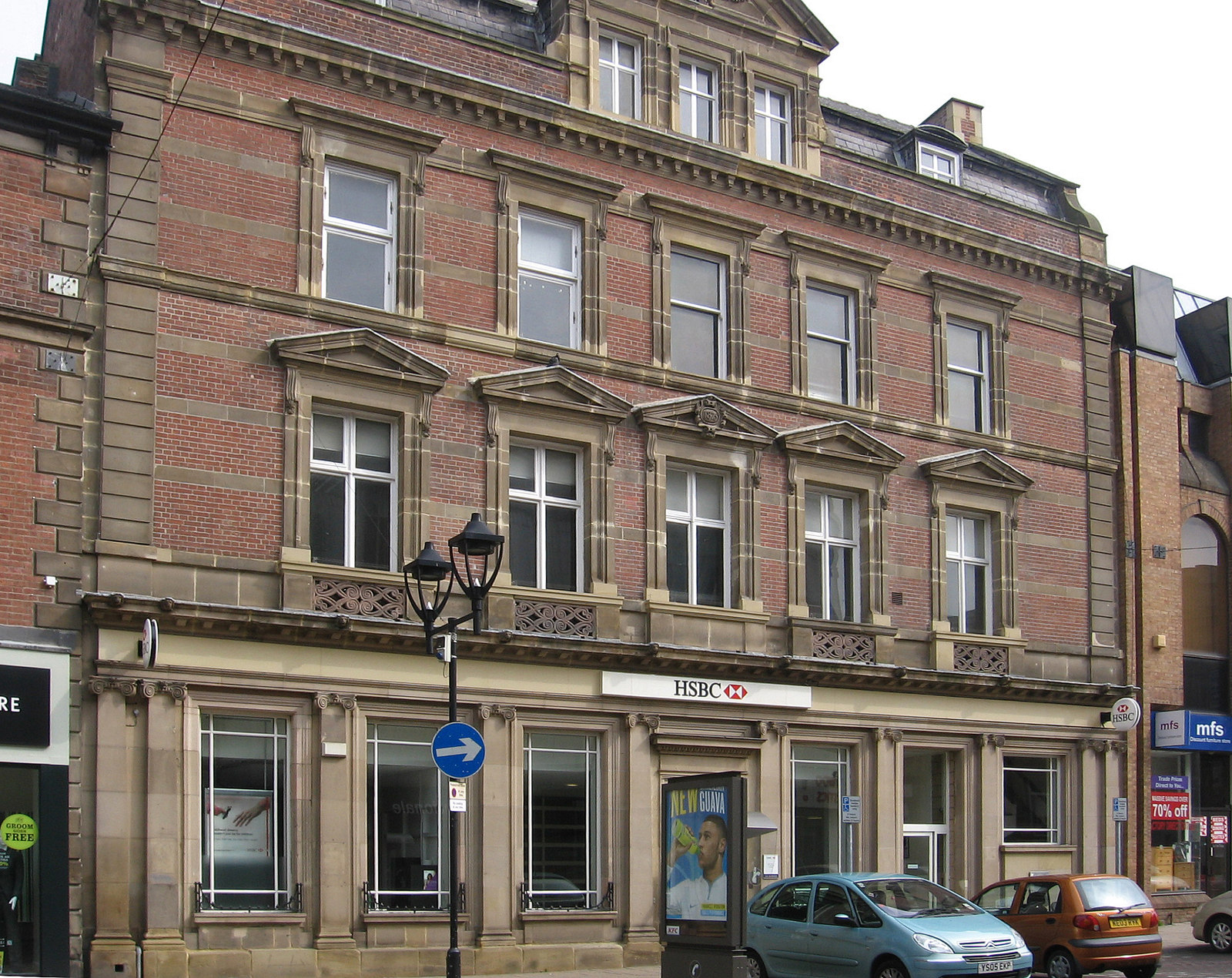
The Rotherham branch of 1876

The head office was based in Sheffield. The branch offices were located at:

- Attercliffe, Carlton Road. Opened 25 January 1875
- Broomhill, 253 Fulwood Road. Opened 2 June 1890
- Chesterfield. South Street. Opened 1875.
- Heeley
- Hillsborough, 23 Langsett Road. Opened 9 June 1890
- Penistone. Opened 1875 (formerly an agency)
- Retford. Carol Gate. Opened 1846 (formerly the Sheffield and Retford Bank)
- Rotherham. Opened 1 January 1873 (temporary premises). New premises in College Street designed by architects Hadfield and Son of Sheffield opened in 1876.
- Sheffield Moor, junction of Cemetery Road / London Road Sheffield opened 3 May 1875 Rebuilt at 1 Ecclesall Road/Cemetery Road, 1894 (to the designs of John Brightmore Mitchell-Withers.
