= Paradise Square =

Square in Sheffield, England

Coordinates: 53.3839°N 1.4703°W

Paradise Square is a Georgian square in the City of Sheffield, England. Located to the northwest of Sheffield Cathedral, the square is set on a slope and was formerly used for public meetings.

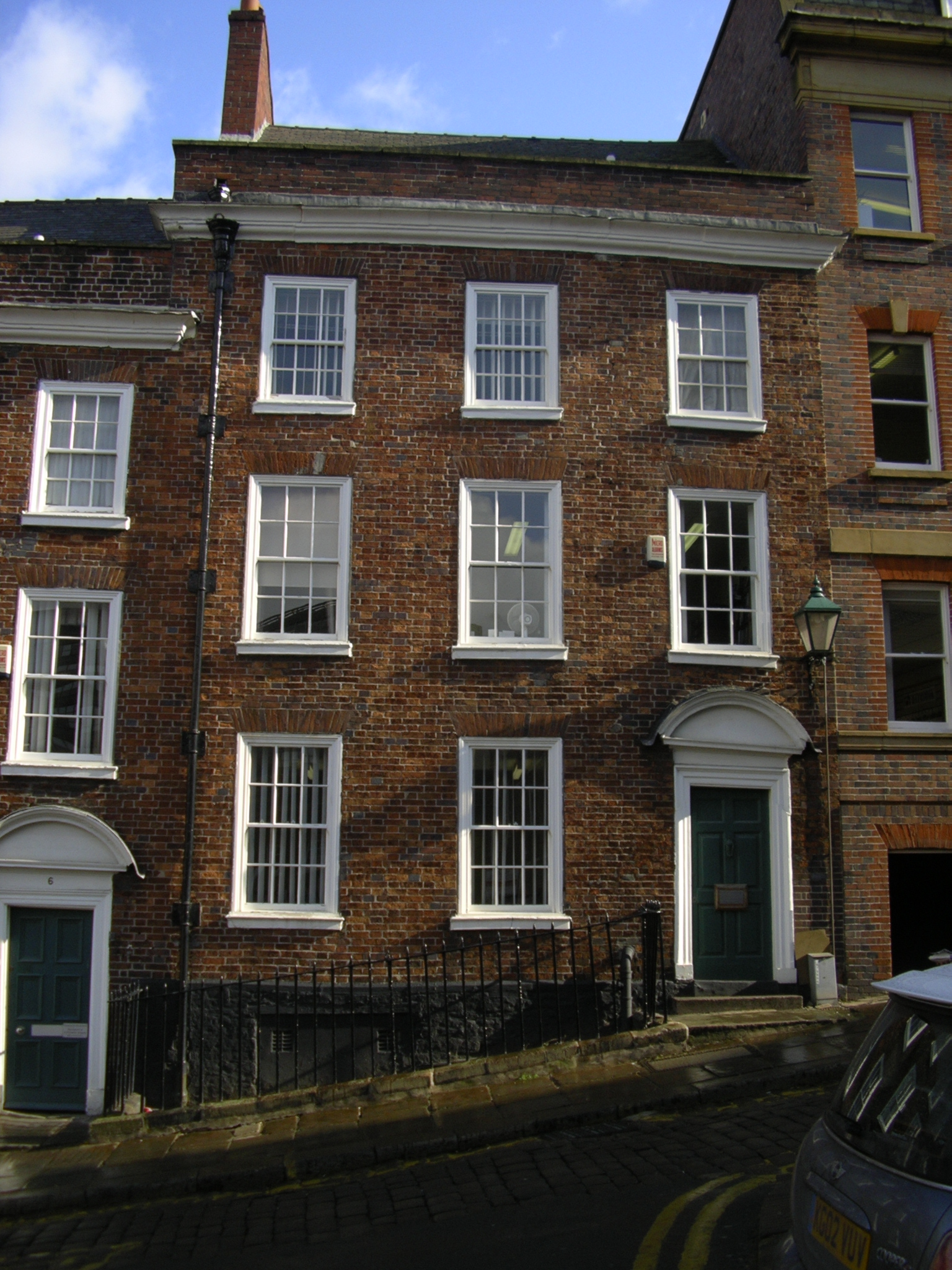
A house on the east side of Paradise Square.

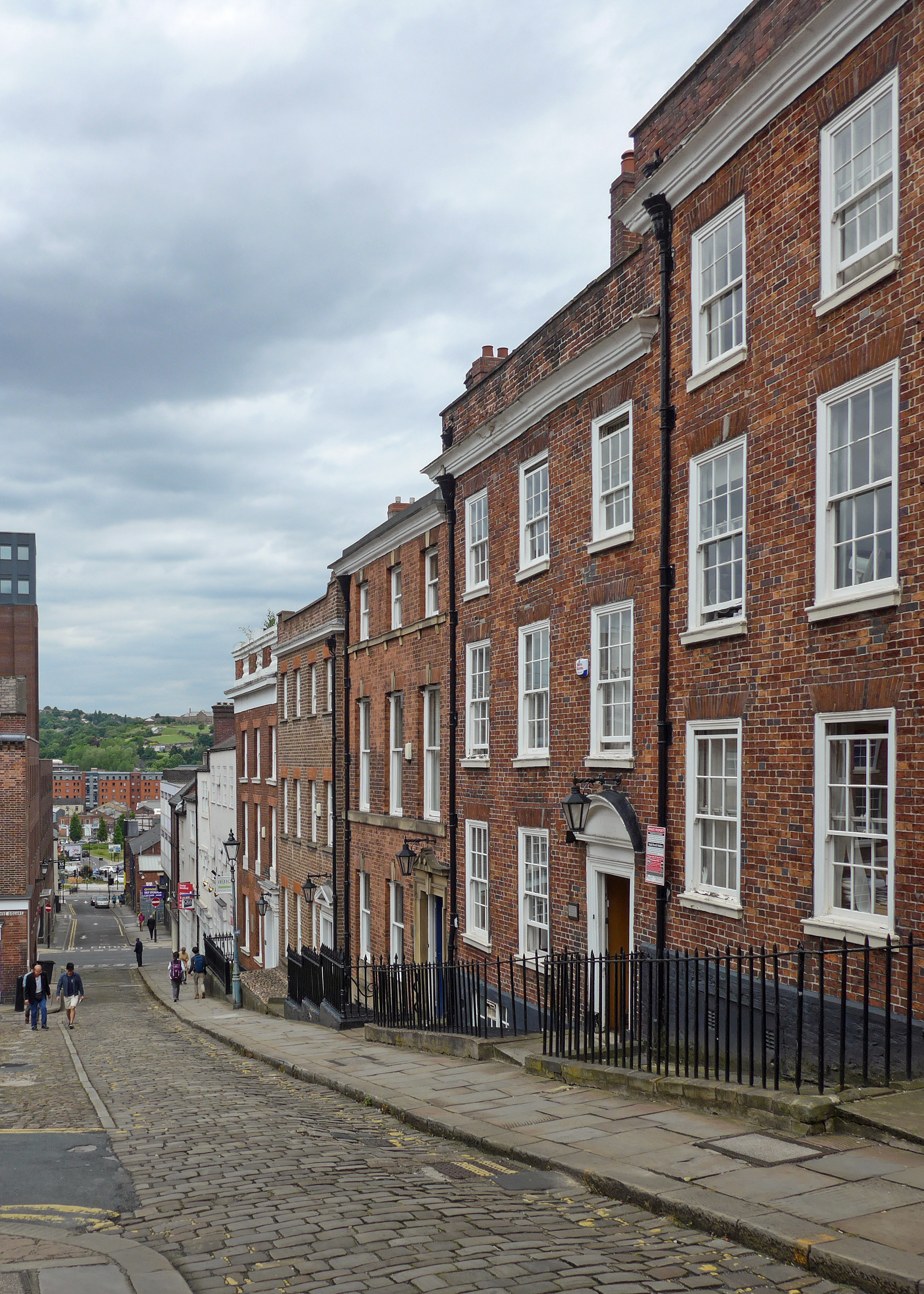
Paradise Square

== History ==
Paradise Square was built in the 18th century on the site of Hicks' stile-field, the stile being one of the entrances to the church-yard. The reason for the choice of the name Paradise Square is uncertain, but local historians R. E. Leader and S. O. Addy speculated that it may be an allusion to the ancient use of Paradise or Parvis as the name for a garden or enclosed space near a church. The area acquired the nickname Pot Square when crockery vendors were moved here from the High Street in around 1808.

=== Buildings ===
The east side of the square consists of five houses built in 1736 by Nicholas Broadbent on land leased from the trustees of the Shrewsbury Hospital. The other houses in the square were built by his son Thomas Broadbent, from 1771 to c.1790. Number 11 is dated 1787. Following bomb damage in the Second World War, parts of the square were extensively restored between 1963-6 by Hadfield, Cawkwell, Davidson and Partners, when numbers 18 and 26 were largely rebuilt using materials that were salvaged from buildings elsewhere. In the mid-1980s, an early 19th-century Gothic Revival stuccoed building at number 10 was rebuilt with a Neo-Georgian facade. All buildings in the square are Grade II* listed.

=== Public meetings ===
Describing Paradise Square, J. E. Manning, Minister of Upper Chapel, wrote in 1900 "Paradise Square was not then [in 1831] so quiet as it ordinarily is now. It was often thronged with excited crowds who came to hear what their leaders had to say on all the stirring topics of the time." Number 18 was built with a Masonic Hall on the upper floor. This was accessed from the square via a staircase with a balcony at the top that became the rostrum for speakers at public meetings.

The first recorded assembly in Paradise Square was on 15 July 1779 when John Wesley preached to what he would later note in his journal was "the largest congregation I ever saw on a weekday". The Methodist Conference commissioned a memorial to be placed in the square commemorating this event. This was designed by Alfred Tory, and unveiled in 1951 by J. Arthur Rank. John Wesley was not the only preacher to use the Paradise Square, Rowland Hill preached in the square on 26 September 1798.

Paradise Square was also used by the chartists in Sheffield for a number of meetings, notably on 12 September 1839 when the crowd was dispersed by troops leading to a running battle and a number of arrests. Throughout the 19th century it was traditional that those standing for election to represent the Sheffield constituency in Parliament held political meetings in the square. The balcony at number 18 was removed in 1889, effectively ending the use of the square as a meeting place.

== Residents ==
Though the pottery market in the square was not long-lived, a number of the buildings in the square were used by glass and china dealers throughout the 19th century. Early residents of square were mostly from the Upper Middle classes, such as attorneys and physicians. Notable former residents include sculptor Sir Francis Chantrey, who had a studio here at No. 24 in 1802, and physician David Daniel Davis, who lived at No. 12 from 1803 to 1812. Through the 19th century there were a number of public houses in the square, including the Old Cock tavern at number 11 and Q in the corner inn at number 17. In recent years the buildings have been used as offices, though in 2008 numbers 7 and 9 were converted into a restaurant.

== Future ==
When funding becomes available, the square will be converted to an urban park as part of the Grey to Green Scheme set up by Sheffield City Council.

== See also ==
Sheffield Outrages

== Bibliography ==
- Jackson, Albert (2008). Looking Through The Windows of Paradise Square Sheffield. Sheffield: John Harley Publishing. ISBN 978-1-904185-01-7.
- Leader, Robert Eadon, ed. (1876). Reminiscences of Old Sheffield: Its Streets and Its People. Sheffield: Leader & sons.
- Leader, Robert Eadon (1901). Sheffield in the Eighteenth Century. Sheffield: Sheffield Independent Press.
