= Samuel Worth =

English architect

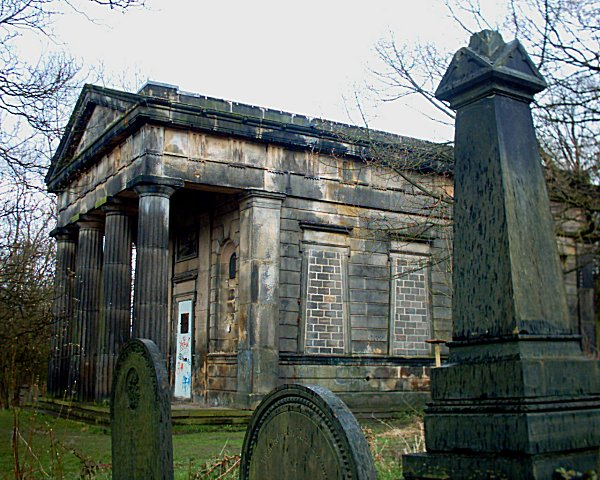
Non-conformists’ Chapel, Sheffield General Cemetery

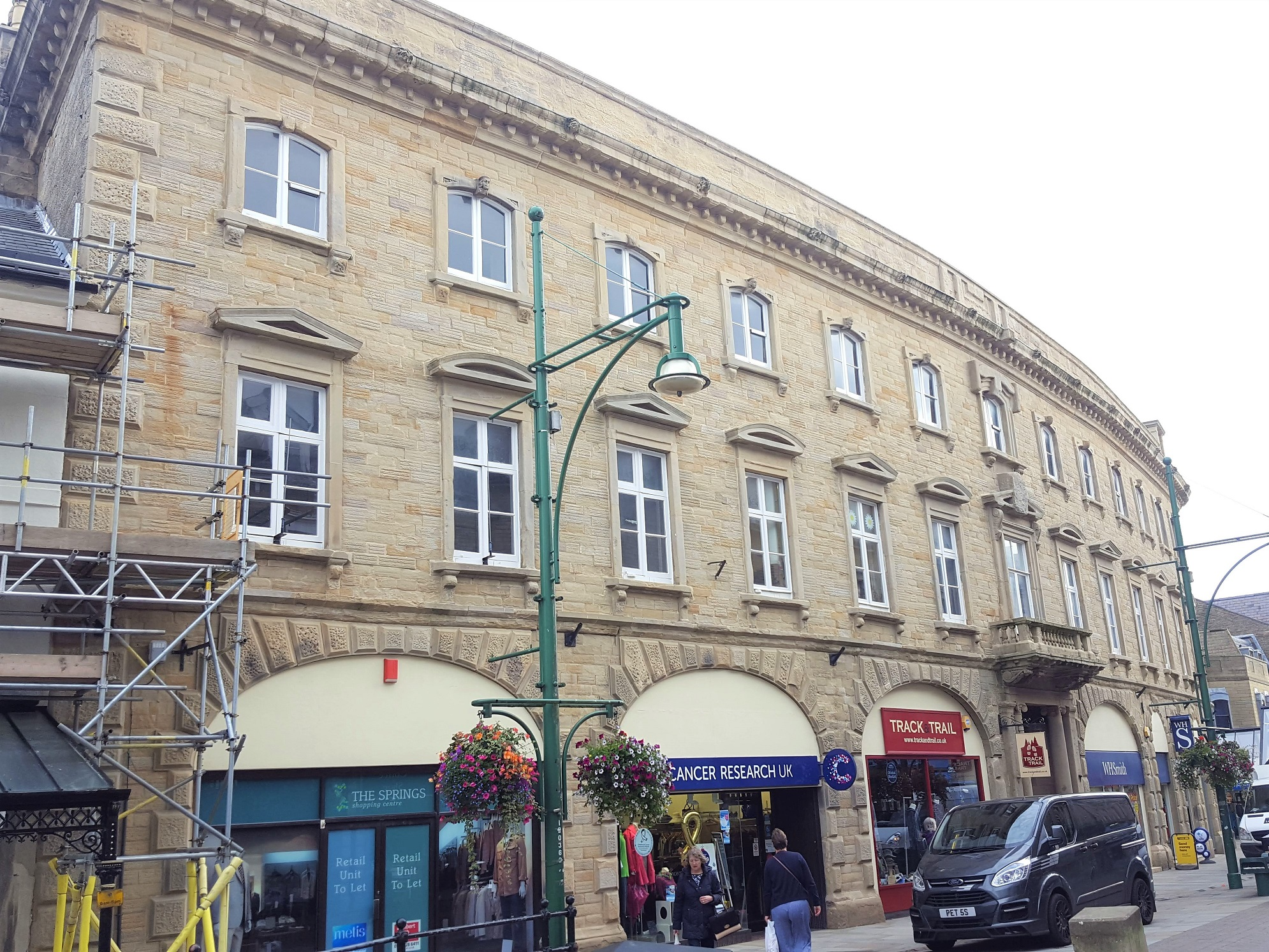
Royal Hotel, Winster Gardens, Buxton 1849–51

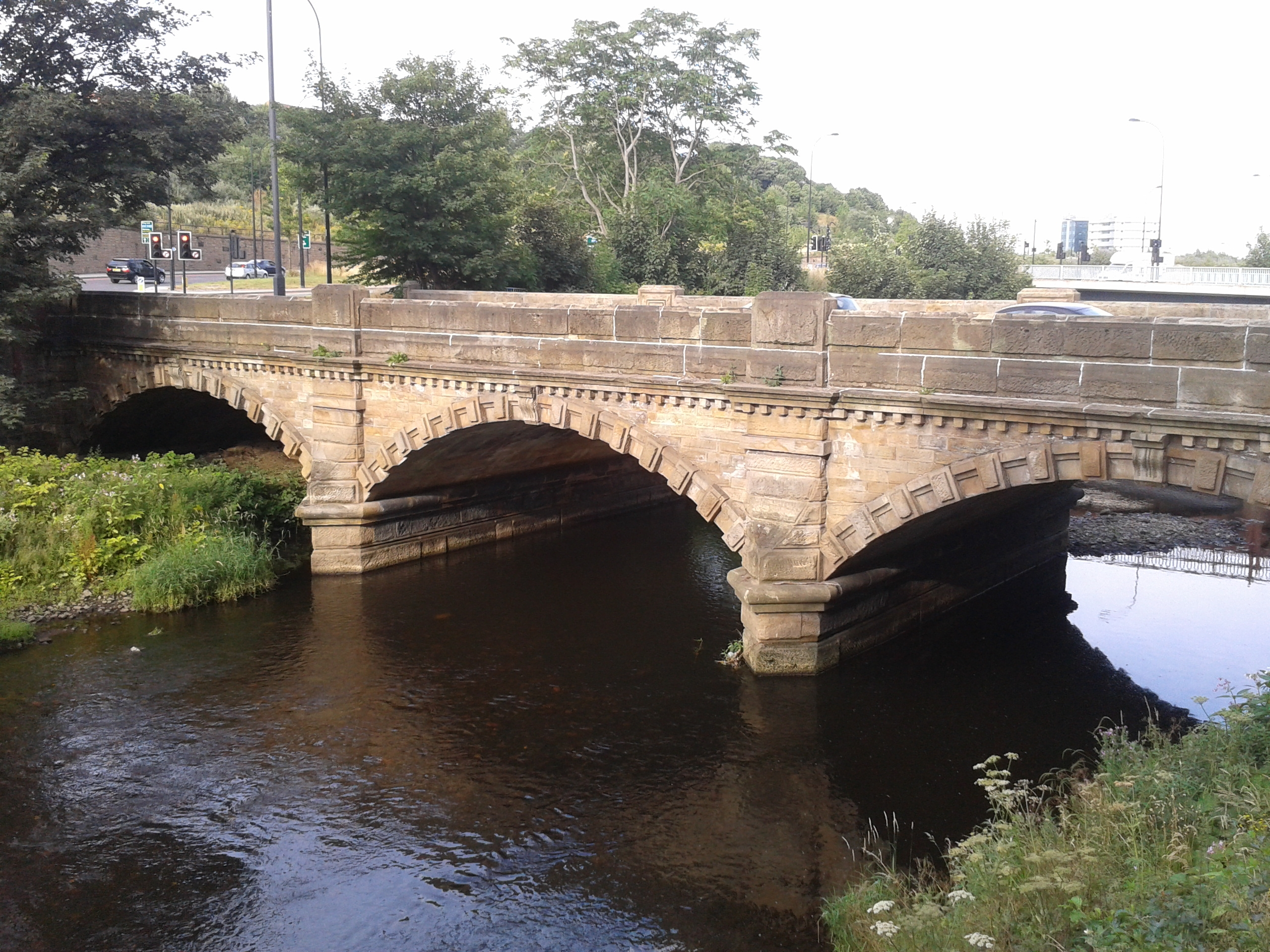
Borough Bridge, Corporation Street, Sheffield 1853

Samuel Worth (1798 – 20 January 1870) was an architect based in Sheffield.

== Life ==
He was born in 1798 in Hougham, Lincolnshire, the son of Thomas Worth (1767-1833) a builder, and Elizabeth Arnold (1772-1847). He was baptised in All Saints' Church, Hougham on 13 March 1798.

He married Anne Andrews, daughter of William C. Andrews on 11 March 1829 in Sheffield Parish Church.

He died at his home in Clinton Place, Worksop, on 26 January 1870. He was buried in Sheffield General Cemetery.

== Career ==
His career as an architect began in Sheffield around 1824. He was in partnership with Joseph Botham of Sheffield from 1826 to 1827, then a partnership with James Harrison from 1828 to 1831. Following the dissolving of the partnership in October 1831 he moved from his offices and home in Chapel Walk to new premises on East Parade.

Around 1840 he entered into a partnership with John Frith which lasted until 1846.

Amongst his pupils were John Dodsley Webster and John Brightmore Mitchell-Withers, both of whom made significant contributions to the built environment of Sheffield.

In 1856 he moved his offices from 46 High Street to 8 George Street.

== Works ==
- Free Writing School, Townhead Street, Sheffield 1827–28
- Surgeon's Hall, Medical Society, Surrey Street, Sheffield 1829 (with James Harrison)
- Eighteen dwelling houses for James Fearnley, Glossop Road, Sheffield 1831
- Cutlers' Hall, Sheffield 1832–33 (with Benjamin Broomhead Taylor)
- Non-conformist Chapel, General Cemetery, Sheffield 1836
- Sheffield and Hallamshire Bank, Church Street, Sheffield 1838
- Hayfield Union Workhouse, Low Leighton, New Mills, Derbyshire 1839
- Royal Hotel, Winster Place, Buxton 1849–51
- Borough Bridge, Sheffield 1853 (with Samuel Holmes)
