= Cutlers' Hall =

Guildhall in Sheffield, England

Coordinates: 53°22′56″N 1°28′11″W

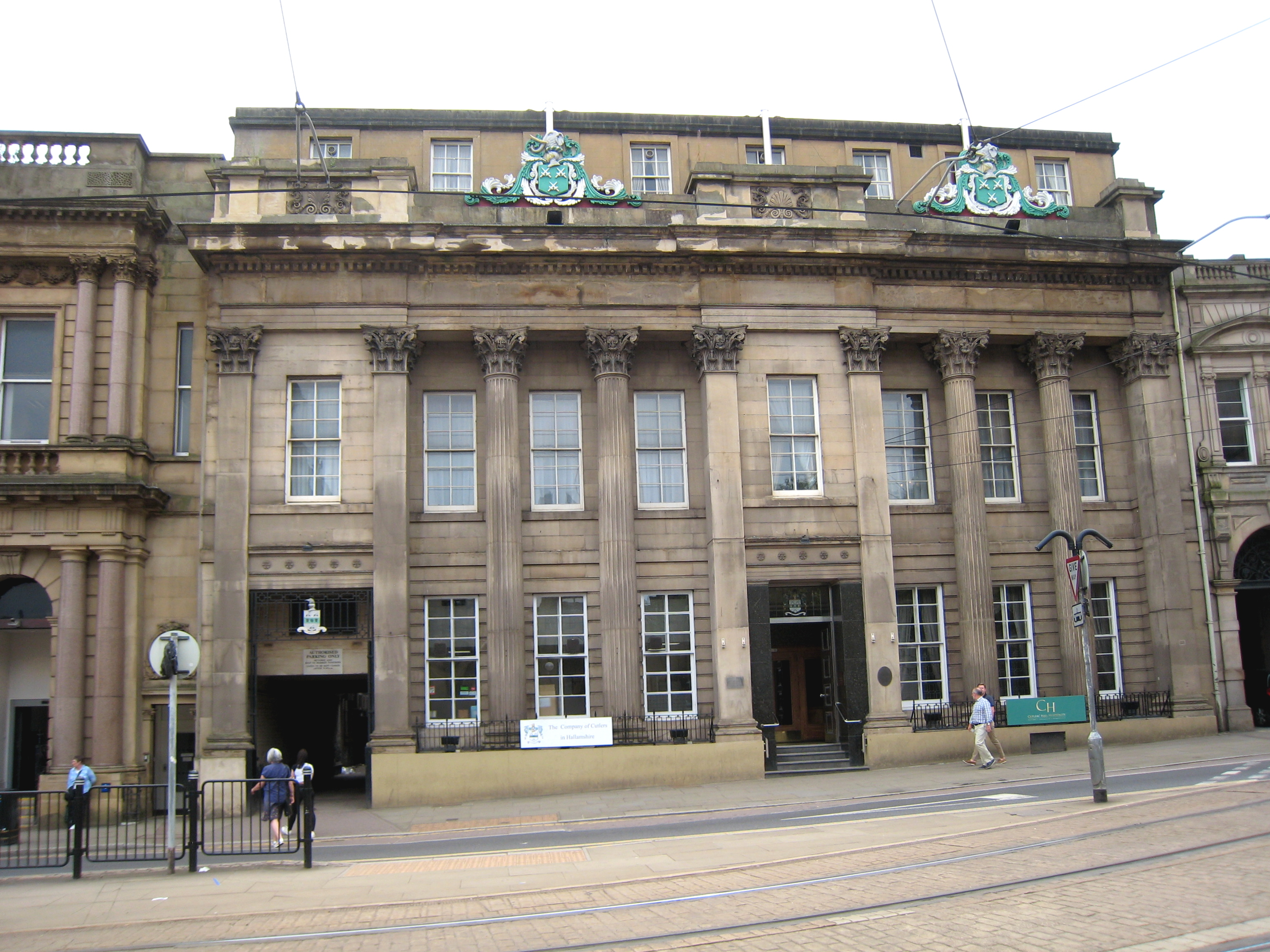
Cutler's Hall

Cutlers' Hall is a Grade II* listed building in Sheffield, England, that is the headquarters of the Company of Cutlers in Hallamshire. It is located on Church Street, opposite Sheffield Cathedral, in Sheffield City Centre.

== History and architecture ==
The current building is Sheffield's third Cutlers' Hall, the previous buildings, which were built in the same location, were constructed in 1638 and 1725. Prior to 1638, the cutlers met in rented accommodation with tradition saying that this was a public house on Fargate, although there is no documentary evidence to back this up.

The first Cutlers' Hall, a stone building with a slated roof, was built in 1638 at a cost of £155 15s 10d, of which £57 18s 4d was raised by subscription. The building was quickly found to be inadequate, having to be repaired on many occasions and in 1725, a new Cutlers' Hall was erected on the same site at a cost of £442 (equivalent to £61,734 in 2025). It was an attractive, narrow Georgian three storeyed building with a string course cornice. Towards the end of the 18th century the Cutlers' Hall was used as an overspill court room as the Town Hall across Church Street could not cope with the increasing number of crimes.

The Cutlers' Hall was built by Samuel Worth and Benjamin Broomhead Taylor at a cost of £6,500 (equivalent to £630,000 in 2025). Construction started in 1832 and it was opened in September 1833. The report in the Sheffield Independent of 7 September 1833 gives a description:

The front is exceedingly handsome. It is to be regretted, that it could not have been a greater width, but considering the space to which it is limited, the design could scarcely have been improved. Two gas lights have very judiciously been placed at each extremity, which, when lighted, have a very happy effect, and shew the front to great advantage. The front is the Corinthian style of architecture. It consists of six columns and pilasters (from the example of the remains of the celebrated temple of Jupitor Stator), supporting a proporitionate entablature, which is surmounted by an enriched attic order, and crowned in the centre with the Cutler’s arms in bold relief. There is a door at each extremity of the front. That on the right opens into a spacious vestibule, 42 feet long by 11½ wide, ornamented with handsome Doric columns, having on the left a committee room, 25 feet by 23. Further on is the grand staircase, lighted from the dome, and ascending by a double flight of stops to the saloon. The saloon is 50 feet long by 16½ wide, finished at each end with segment niches, ornamented with fluted columns and Grecian antea, from the example of a building at Athens.

It was extended in 1865–7 to the designs of architects Flockton & Abbott when at a cost of £4,000 (equivalent to £390,000 in 2025) it was provided with a new banqueting hall, 110 feet (34 m) long by 50 feet (15 m) wide with a gallery for ladies. A new kitchen was installed with the capacity to provide dinner for 500 people. The banqueting hall was decorated by Messrs Rodgers of King Street, Sheffield. The two chandeliers which illuminated the room cost £500.

Further extension took place in 1888 to the designs of the architect J. B. Mitchel-Withers. The shop which stood to the west of the entrance in Church Street was demolished for the expansion of the hall frontage. The additional space on the ground floor was utilised for a board room. A stone from the original building bearing the words Cutlers’ Hall, 1638 was preserved in the new building. A new drawing room was provided on the first floor 69 feet (21 m) long by 25 feet (7.6 m) wide. The ladies’ gallery in the banqueting hall was extended to the full width of the room. A new stone staircase was installed connecting the banqueting hall with the lower hall. The contractors were Messrs. Ash, Son, and Biggin. The carving of the capitals was executed by Mr. Gilman of Sheffield. The painting was done by F. Jeckell, Glossop road, the stove grates were by Steel and Garland, the chimney pieces were from Messrs Yates, Haywood and Co., of Rotherham, the gas chandeliers were manufactured by Messrs. Hart, Sons, Peard and Co of Regent Street, London. The furniture was provided by Johnson and Appleyards.

The Hall's front is of the Corinthian order. Behind the classical façade is an intricate series of rooms which reach back almost as far as Fargate. The banks neighbouring the Cutlers' Hall are in a similar style. One was designed by Samuel Worth in 1838, the other was completed in 1867.

== Function ==
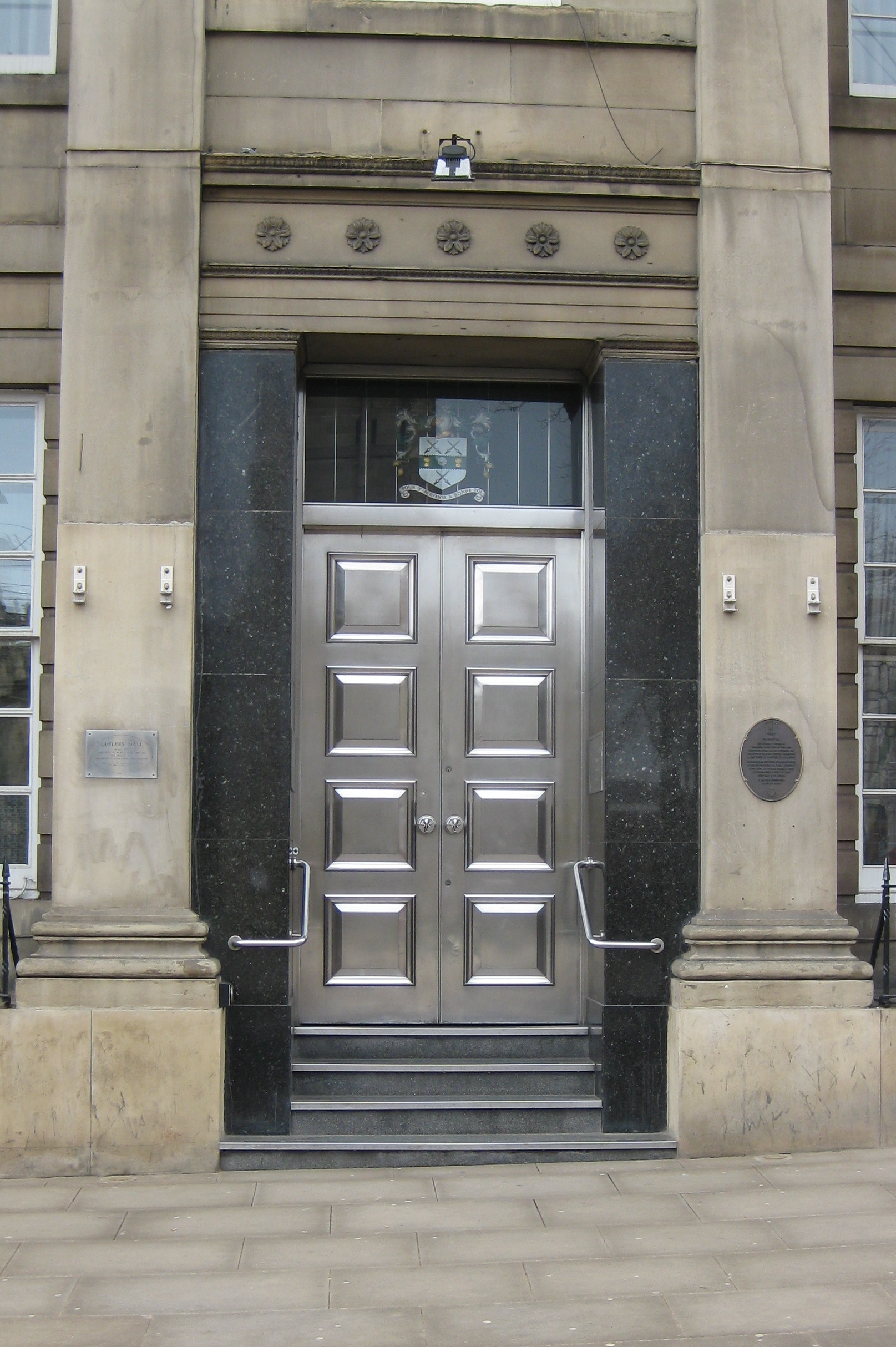
Cutlers' Hall's steel door

There is a selection of old Hallamshire knives on show inside the hall, some of which go back to the Elizabethan era. Many of the knives were discovered by Thames mudlarks in the tidal mud of the River Thames in London. Also on display is the Norfolk Knife, a very large pocket knife with 75 blades which was made by Joseph Rodgers and Sons at their Norfolk Street Works in Sheffield for the Crystal Palace Great Exhibition of 1851.

The building is used for many of the grandest events in the city's civic and commercial life, for instance the annual Cutlers' Feast which became an annual event in 1648. For the years up to 2008, there were 372 Cutlers' Feasts, with breaks only for the World Wars and a cancellation in 1921.

The Cutlers' Hall is maintained by the Cutlers' Hall Preservation Trust, a registered charity.

== See also ==
- Company of Cutlers in Hallamshire
- Master Cutler
- Listed buildings in Sheffield
