= Listed buildings in Sheffield S10 =

The S10 district lies within the City of Sheffield, South Yorkshire, England. The district contains 185 listed buildings that are recorded in the National Heritage List for England. Of these, 12 are listed at Grade II*, the middle grade, and the others are at Grade II, the lowest grade. The district is in the south west of the city of Sheffield, and covers the areas Broomhill, Crookes, Crookesmoor, Crosspool, Fulwood, Lodge Moor, Nether Green and Ranmoor, and part of Broomhall.

For neighbouring areas, see listed buildings in Sheffield City Centre, listed buildings in S3, listed buildings in S6, listed buildings in S11, and listed buildings in Hathersage.

== Key ==
Grade	Criteria
II*	Particularly important buildings of more than special interest
II	Buildings of national importance and special interest

== Buildings ==
Name and location	Street	Photograph	Date	Notes	Grade
Barncliff Stoop; 53.37487°N 1.54550°W	Redmires Road		14th century	At Hallam Head	II
Fulwood Hall; 53.36364°N 1.55961°W	Harrison Lane		15th century		II
Stumperlowe Cottage; 53.36814°N 1.53854°W	Stumperlowe Hall Road		15th century		II
Broom Hall; 53.37481°N 1.48825°W	Broomhall Road		About 1500		II*
The Barn; 53.36995°N 1.53852°W	Stumperlowe Hall Road		Early 17th century		II
Grange Farmhouse; 53.37006°N 1.53835°W	Stumperlowe Hall Road		Late 17th century		II
Stumperlowe Grange and Stumperlowe House; 53.36744°N 1.53817°W	Stumperlowe Hall Road		Late 17th century		II
Carr Houses; 53.35998°N 1.55346°W	Mayfield Road		About 1700		II
White House Farmhouse and Adjoining Stable; 53.35671°N 1.54961°W	Wood Cliffe		Early 18th Century		II
Fulwood Old Chapel; 53.36220°N 1.54649°W	Whiteley Lane		1729		II
Old School House; 53.36254°N 1.55190°W	School Green Lane		1736		II
Chapel House; 53.36224°N 1.54643°W	Whiteley Lane		Mid 18th Century		II
Hole in the Wall Farmhouse & Buildings; 53.36282°N 1.55860°W	David Lane		Mid 18th Century		II
1, 2 & 3 Brookhouse Hill; 53.36022°N 1.54436°W	Brookhouse Hill		Late 18th Century		II
Carr Houses Barn; 53.36029°N 1.55317°W	Quiet Lane		Late 18th Century		II
Douse Croft Farmhouse; 53.36051°N 1.56945°W	Douse Croft Lane		Late 18th Century		II
Douse Croft Farm, granary, barn and cowshed 53.36056°N 1.56960°W	Douse Croft Lane		Late 18th Century		II
450 & 452 Fulwood Road; 53.36811°N 1.52928°W	Fulwood Road		Late 18th Century		II
4 Park Lane; 53.37477°N 1.48889°W	Park Lane		Late 18th Century		II
Swallow Farmhouse; 53.36446°N 1.57123°W	Brown Hills Lane		Late 18th Century		II
West Carr Cottages; 53.36193°N 1.56149°W	David Lane		Late 18th Century		II
446–464 Fulwood Road Wall and Gate Piers; 53.36789°N 1.52916°W	Fulwood Road		About 1800		II
446 & 448 Fulwood Road; 53.36817°N 1.52913°W	Fulwood Road		About 1800		II
458 Fulwood Road; 53.36802°N 1.52952°W	Fulwood Road		About 1800		II
460 & 462 Fulwood Road; 53.36801°N 1.52961°W	Fulwood Road		About 1800		II
464 Fulwood Road; 53.36801°N 1.52973°W	Fulwood Road		About 1800		II
255–261 Glossop Road; 53.38000°N 1.48368°W	Glossop Road		About 1820		II
281 & 283 Glossop Road; 53.38006°N 1.48548°W	Glossop Road		About 1820		II
The Guildhall; 53.36508°N 1.53985°W	Fulwood Road		1824		II
Botanical Gardens Bear Pit; 53.37161°N 1.49939°W	Botanical Gardens		Early 19th century		II
13 Broomgrove Road; 53.37402°N 1.49335°W	Broomgrove Road		Early 19th century		II
287 & 289 Glossop Road; 53.38008°N 1.48606°W	Glossop Road		About 1825		II
17 Pisgah House Road; 53.37966°N 1.50256°W	Pisgah House Road		Early 19th century		II
Stocks at Fulwood Old Chapel; 53.36226°N 1.54657°W	Whiteley Lane		Early 19th century		II
109 Tom Lane; 53.36997°N 1.53482°W	Tom Lane		Early 19th century		II
Broomgrove House; 53.37529°N 1.49480°W	Clarkehouse Road		About 1830		II
2 Broomhall Road; 53.37501°N 1.48586°W	Broomhall Road		About 1830		II
454 & 456 Fulwood Road; 53.36805°N 1.52943°W	Fulwood Road		About 1830		II
269 & 271 Glossop Road; 53.38003°N 1.48465°W	Glossop Road		About 1830		II
273 & 275 Glossop Road; 53.38005°N 1.48491°W	Glossop Road		About 1830		II
277 & 279 Glossop Road; 53.38005°N 1.48522°W	Glossop Road		About 1830		II
344 & 346 Glossop Road; 53.38036°N 1.48566°W	Glossop Road		About 1830		II
Holly Mount; 53.37591°N 1.53621°W	Sandygate Road		1831		II
The Mount; 53.37680°N 1.49885°W	Glossop Road		1832	Designed by William Flockton	II*
Collegiate Hall; 53.37117°N 1.49091°W	Collegiate Crescent		1835	Probably designed by John Grey Weightman	II
Botanical Gardens Central Glasshouse; 53.37262°N 1.49887°W	Botanical Gardens		About 1836	Designed by Benjamin Broomhead Taylor	II*
Sheffield Hallam University Main Building; 53.37237°N 1.49151°W	Collegiate Crescent		About 1836	Designed by John Grey Weightman	II
Christ Church; 53.36519°N 1.54240°W	Brookhouse Hill		1837		II
Botanical Gardens Gateway, Lodges, Walls and Railings; 53.37321°N 1.49813°W	Botanical Gardens		1838	Designed by Benjamin Broomhead Taylor	II
Botanical Gardens Left Glasshouse; 53.37233°N 1.49917°W	Botanical Gardens		1838	Designed by Benjamin Broomhead Taylor	II*
Botanical Gardens Right Glasshouse; 53.37294°N 1.49849°W	Botanical Gardens		1838	Designed by Benjamin Broomhead Taylor	II*
King Edward VII Upper School; 53.37622°N 1.49575°W	Glossop Road		1838	Designed by William Flockton	II*
King Edward VII Upper School Former Caretakers House; 53.37673°N 1.49470°W	Glossop Road		1838	Designed by William Flockton	II*
King Edward VII Upper School Gate Piers; 53.37677°N 1.49484°W	Glossop Road		1838	Designed by William Flockton	II*
Birkdale School; 53.37323°N 1.49599°W	Clarke Drive		About 1840		II
20 Broomhall Road; 53.37377°N 1.49001°W	Broomhall Road		About 1840		II
2 Claremont Place; 53.37881°N 1.49039°W	Claremont Place		About 1840		II
8 Claremont Place; 53.37915°N 1.49140°W	Claremont Place		About 1840		II
10 Claremont Place; 53.37923°N 1.49165°W	Claremont Place		About 1840		II
5 Clarkehouse Road; 53.37703°N 1.49168°W	Clarkehouse Road		About 1840		II
Former Spiritualist Church; 53.37965°N 1.48960°W	Clarkson Street		About 1840		II
285 Glossop Road; 53.38007°N 1.48573°W	Glossop Road		About 1840		II
305 Glossop Road; 53.37986°N 1.48778°W	Glossop Road		About 1840		II
338 & 340 Glossop Road; 53.38033°N 1.48519°W	Glossop Road		About 1840		II
342 Glossop Road; 53.38034°N 1.48539°W	Glossop Road		About 1840		II
361, 363 & 365 Glossop Road; 53.37833°N 1.49025°W	Glossop Road		About 1840		II
367–373 Glossop Road; 53.37819°N 1.49048°W	Glossop Road		About 1840		II
375–385 Glossop Road; 53.37796°N 1.49075°W	Glossop Road		About 1840		II
440 Glossop Road; 53.37731°N 1.49420°W	Glossop Road		About 1840		II
Moorend Place; 53.3880°N 1.49792°W	Commonside		About 1840		II
1 Northumberland Road; 53.37947°N 1.48998°W	Northumberland Road		About 1840		II
Park House; 53.37353°N 1.49043°W	Broomhall Road		About 1840	At 14 Broomhall Road	II
303 Western Bank; 53.38095°N 1.49268°W	Western Bank		About 1840		II
West Mount; 53.37622°N 1.49959°W	Glossop Road		About 1840		II
22 Wilkinson Street; 53.37955°N 1.48446°W	Wilkinson Street		About 1840		II
27 Wilkinson Street; 53.37913°N 1.48448°W	Wilkinson Street		About 1840		II
32 Wilkinson Street; 53.37954°N 1.48544°W	Wilkinson Street		About 1840		II
47 Wilkinson Street; 53.37913°N 1.48600°W	Wilkinson Street		About 1840		II
91–101 Wilkinson Street; 53.37915°N 1.48893°W	Wilkinson Street		About 1840		II
Robert Ernest Memorial; 53.37775°N 1.49223°W	Glossop Road		1841	Near Royal Hallamshire Hospital	II
Agnes Verel House; 53.37834°N 1.48642°W	Brunswick Street		About 1845		II
Beulah Kop; 53.37980°N 1.48959°W	Clarkson Street		About 1845		II
4–20 and 20a Clarkehouse Road; 53.37688°N 1.49269°W	Clarkehouse Road		About 1845		II
2 & 4 Collegiate Crescent; 53.37643°N 1.48659°W	Collegiate Crescent		About 1845		II
6 & 8 Collegiate Crescent; 53.37642°N 1.48701°W	Collegiate Crescent		About 1845		II
32 Collegiate Crescent; 53.37494°N 1.49209°W	Collegiate Crescent		About 1845	Part of Sheffield Hallam University Collegiate College Campus	II
329–335 Glossop Road; 53.37898°N 1.48940°W	Glossop Road		About 1845		II
348 & 350 Glossop Road; 53.38037°N 1.48587°W	Glossop Road		About 1845		II
356 Glossop Road; 53.38038°N 1.48614°W	Glossop Road		About 1845		II
Grieg House; 53.37937°N 1.48852°W	Wilkinson Street		About 1845	At 66 Wilkinson Street	II
301 Western Bank; 53.38097°N 1.49247°W	Western Bank		About 1845		II
33 & 35 Wilkinson Street; 53.37914°N 1.48513°W	Wilkinson Street		About 1845		II
267 Glossop Road; 53.38003°N 1.48443°W	Glossop Road		About 1848		II
Ashdell and Stable and Walls; 53.37510°N 1.50266°W	Ashdell		About 1850		II
Ashdell Wall and Gate Piers; 53.37521°N 1.50216°W	Ashdell		About 1850		II
6–20 Ashgate Road; 53.37655°N 1.50245°W	Ashgate Road		About 1850		II
Botanical Gardens South Lodge; 53.37111°N 1.49510°W	Botanical Gardens		Mid 19th century		II
61–67 Clarkehouse Road; 53.37471°N 1.49588°W	Clarkehouse Road		About 1850		II
40 Collegiate Crescent; 53.37367°N 1.49226°W	Collegiate Crescent		Mid 19th century	Part of Sheffield Hallam University Collegiate Crescent Campus	II
Crewe Hall Stable Block; 53.37346°N 1.50260°W	Clarkehouse Road		About 1850		II
Crewe Hall Wardens House; 53.37307°N 1.50262°W	Clarkehouse Road		About 1850		II
319 & 321 Glossop Road; 53.37938°N 1.48876°W	Glossop Road		About 1850		II
Lodge to Oakbrook; 53.37346°N 1.51469°W	Fulwood Road		About 1850	At 375 Fulwood Road. Now part of St Marie's School	II
Peel Terrace; 53.37955°N 1.48726°W	Peel Terrace		About 1850		II
Sheffield Hallam University Main Building Lodge; 53.37259°N 1.49113°W	Collegiate Crescent		About 1850		II
Sheffield Hallam University Main Building Wall and Gate Piers; 53.37250°N 1.49091°W	Collegiate Crescent		About 1850		II
Sheffield Religious Education Centre; 53.37620°N 1.49824°W	Melbourne Avenue		About 1850	Now The Sheffield High School, Sixth Form Centre	II
9 & 11 Taptonville Road; 53.37756°N 1.50359°W	Taptonville Road		About 1850	And attached boundary wall and railings	II
13 & 15 Taptonville Road; 53.37772°N 1.50371°W	Taptonville Road		About 1850	And attached boundary wall and railings	II
17 & 19 Taptonville Road; 53.37789°N 1.50384°W	Taptonville Road		About 1850	And attached boundary wall and railings	II
Weston Park South East Gateway; 53.38109°N 1.48971°W	Western Bank		About 1850	Designed by James Gamble and Godfrey Sykes	II
24 Wilkinson Street; 53.37952°N 1.48473°W	Wilkinson Street		Mid 19th century		II
26 Wilkinson Street; 53.37952°N 1.48494°W	Wilkinson Street		Mid 19th century		II
28 & 30 Wilkinson Street; 53.37953°N 1.48520°W	Wilkinson Street		About 1850		II
34 Wilkinson Street; 53.37953°N 1.48567°W	Wilkinson Street		About 1850		II
36 Wilkinson Street; 53.37953°N 1.48586°W	Wilkinson Street		About 1850		II
38 Wilkinson Street; 53.37953°N 1.48610°W	Wilkinson Street		About 1850		II
Ebenezer Elliot statue 53.38135°N 1.49003°W	Weston Park		1854	Designed by Neville Northey Burnard	II
Stumperlowe Hall; 53.36741°N 1.53889°W	Stumperlowe Hall Road		1854		II
Brunswick House; 53.38006°N 1.48686°W	Glossop Road		About 1855		II
Oakbrook; 53.37270°N 1.51713°W	Fulwood Road		About 1855	Part of Notre Dame High School	II
Tapton Hall; 53.37598°N 1.51532°W	Shore Lane		1855	Designed by Flockton & Son	II
Crimean War Memorial; 53.37184°N 1.49684°W	Botanical Gardens		1858	Designed by George Goldie; currently in storage	II
34 Collegiate Crescent; 53.37472°N 1.49285°W	Collegiate Crescent		About 1860		II
Hyde Villas; 53.3757°N 1.49174°W	Park Crescent		About 1860		II
Riverdale House; 53.36955°N 1.52041°W	Graham Road		About 1860		II
Riverdale House Gate Piers; 53.37011°N 1.51913°W	Graham Road		About 1860		II
Riverdale House Lodge; 53.37005°N 1.51905°W	Graham Road		About 1860		II
Cutlery Forge and Assembly Shop; 53.37859°N 1.48692°W	Broomspring Lane		About 1864	At 120A Broomspring Lane	II
Grinding Hull; 53.37874°N 1.48688°W	Broomspring Lane		About 1864	North of 120A Broomspring Lane	II
Endcliffe Hall; 53.37194°N 1.51317°W	Endcliffe Vale Road		1865	Designed by Flockton & Abbot	II*
St Cecilia House; 53.37266°N 1.50022°W	Westbourne Road		1865	Designed by Hadfield and Son	II
Storth Oaks; 53.36998°N 1.52928°W	Graham Road		1860s	Designed by John Dodsley Webster	II
Hyde Place; 53.37581°N 1.49139°W	Park Crescent		1868		II
Tapton Court; 53.37565°N 1.51124°W	Shore Lane		1868		II
36 Collegiate Crescent; 53.37421°N 1.49264°W	Collegiate Crescent		About 1870		II
38 Collegiate Crescent; 53.37396°N 1.49239°W	Collegiate Crescent		About 1870		II
Endcliffe Hall Former Lodge; 53.37158°N 1.51052°W	Endcliffe Vale Road		About 1870	At 61 Endcliffe Vale Road	II
Endcliffe Hall Former Lodge Gate Piers; 53.37151°N 1.51046°W	Endcliffe Vale Road		About 1870	At 61 Endcliffe Vale Road	II
Kersal Mount; 53.37650°N 1.51079°W	Manchester Road		About 1870	Now The Laurels and The Limes Care Home	II
Kersal Mount Gateway and Boundary Walls; 53.37666°N 1.50913°W	Manchester Road		About 1870		II
St Mark's Vicarage; 53.37721°N 1.49569°W	St Mark's Crescent		About 1870		II
Sheffield High School Gymnasium; 53.37550°N 1.49679°W	Rutland Park		About 1870		II
Ashgrove; 53.37470°N 1.50215°W	Westbourne Road		1871	Formerly Radio Sheffield, now Westbourne School	II
Godfrey Sykes Memorial; 53.38247°N 1.49100°W	Weston Park		1871	Designed by James Gamble	II
St Mark, Broomhill; 53.37748°N 1.49533°W	St Mark's Crescent		1871	Designed by William Henry Crossland	II
Ornamental Chimney; 53.37493°N 1.49734°W	Rutland Park		About 1875		II
Overbridge carrying Stumperlowe Crescent Road; 53.36953°N 1.52988°W	Storth Lane		Late 19th century		II
8 Rutland Park; 53.37496°N 1.49796°W	Rutland Park		About 1875	Now part of Sheffield High School	II
8 Rutland Park Wall and Gates; 53.37463°N 1.49787°W	Rutland Park		About 1875		II
Sewer Gas Lamp; 53.37511°N 1.50162°W	Ashdell		Late 19th century	At junction with Westbourne Road	II
Sewer Gas Lamp; 53.37997°N 1.50005°W	Moor Oaks Road		Late 19th century	At north-west end	II
Sewer Gas Lamp; 53.38429°N 1.51416°W	Mulehouse Road		Late 19th century	At junction with Stannington View Road	II
Sewer Gas Lamp; 53.37581°N 1.49241°W	Park Lane		Late 19th century	South of junction with Antrim Avenue	II
Sewer Gas Lamp; 53.38357°N 1.50352°W	School Road		Late 19th century	Opposite junction with Glebe Road	II
Weston Park South West Gateway; 53.38122°N 1.49173°W	Western Bank		Late 19th century		II
Etruria House Hotel; 53.37985°N 1.50250°W	Crookes Road		1876		II
Etruria House Lodge, Gate Piers and Wall; 53.37973°N 1.50173°W	Crookes Road		1876		II
Etruria House Steps, Terrace Wall and Gas Lamp; 53.37973°N 1.50235°W	Crookes Road		1876		II
St John, Ranmoor; 53.37242°N 1.52122°W	Ranmoor Park Road		1879	Designed by Edward Mitchel Gibbs	II*
Sheffield High School; 53.37488°N 1.49841°W	Rutland Park		1884	Probably designed by Tanner & Smith	II
Sheffield High School Wall and Gates; 53.37467°N 1.49837°W	Rutland Park		1884	Probably designed by Tanner & Smith	II
Drama Studio; 53.37921°N 1.48991°W	Glossop Road		1886	Former Glossop Road Baptist Church. Designed by C. J. Innocent	II
Weston Park Museum; 53.38195°N 1.49206°W	Western Bank		1887	Designed by Flockton & Gibbs	II*
The Towers; 53.37718°N 1.53429°W	Sandygate Road		1896	Designed by Flockton & Gibbs	II
The Towers Lodge and Gateway; 53.37702°N 1.53267°W	Sandygate Road		1896	Designed by Flockton & Gibbs	II
Crookesmoor Unitarian Church; 53.38281°N 1.49785°W	Crookesmoor Road		About 1900		II
Electric transformer 53.37188°N 1.52877°W	Storth Lane		About 1900	At junction with Belgrave Road	II
Hale Court; 53.38862°N 1.50656°W	Northfield Road		1900	Designed by William John Hale. Formerly St Luke's Wesleyan Church.	II
Weston Park Bandstand; 53.38217°N 1.49079°W	Weston Park		About 1900		II
Firth Court; 53.38160°N 1.48923°W	Western Bank		1903	Designed by E. Mitchel Gibbs	II
York and Lancaster Regiment Boer War Memorial; 53.38126°N 1.49044°W	Weston Park		1903	Designed by John Dodsley Webster	II
Nether Green School Wall, Gates and Railing; 53.36770°N 1.52909°W	Fulwood Road		1904	Designed by Holmes and Watson	II
381 Fulwood Road Garden Alcove and Steps; 53.37034°N 1.52209°W	Fulwood Road		1905	Designed by Edwin Lutyens	II
Crookes Congregational Church; 53.38650°N 1.50471°W	Springvale Road		1906	Designed by William John Hale	II
Somme Barracks; 53.38026°N 1.48315°W	Glossop Road		1907	Designed by Alfred Ernest Turnell	II
Crookes Cemetery Chapel; 53.38268°N 1.51821°W	Headland Road		1908	Designed by C. and C. M. Hadfield	II
Wesley Hall; 53.38305°N 1.50796°W	Crookes		1908	Designed by William John Hale	II
Nether Green School; 53.36721°N 1.52925°W	Fulwood Road		1909	Designed by Holmes and Watson	II
War Memorial and railings 53.36532°N 1.54112°W	Brookhouse Hill		About 1920	At junction with Canterbury Avenue	II
York and Lancaster Regiment WWI Memorial; 53.38126°N 1.49058°W	Weston Park		About 1920	Designed by Charles Sargent Jagger	II
Ranmoor War Memorial; 53.37219°N 1.52092°W	Ranmoor Park Road		1921		II
K6 phonebox 53.36785°N 1.52925°W	Fulwood Road		Designed 1935	At junction with Tom Lane	II
Arts Tower and Library; 53.38268°N 1.48778°W	Western Bank		1959	Designed by Gollins, Melvin Ward and Partners	II*
1 Park Lane; 53.37423°N 1.49037°W	Park Lane		1960	Designed by Patric Guest	II
