= Crimicar Lane Hospital =

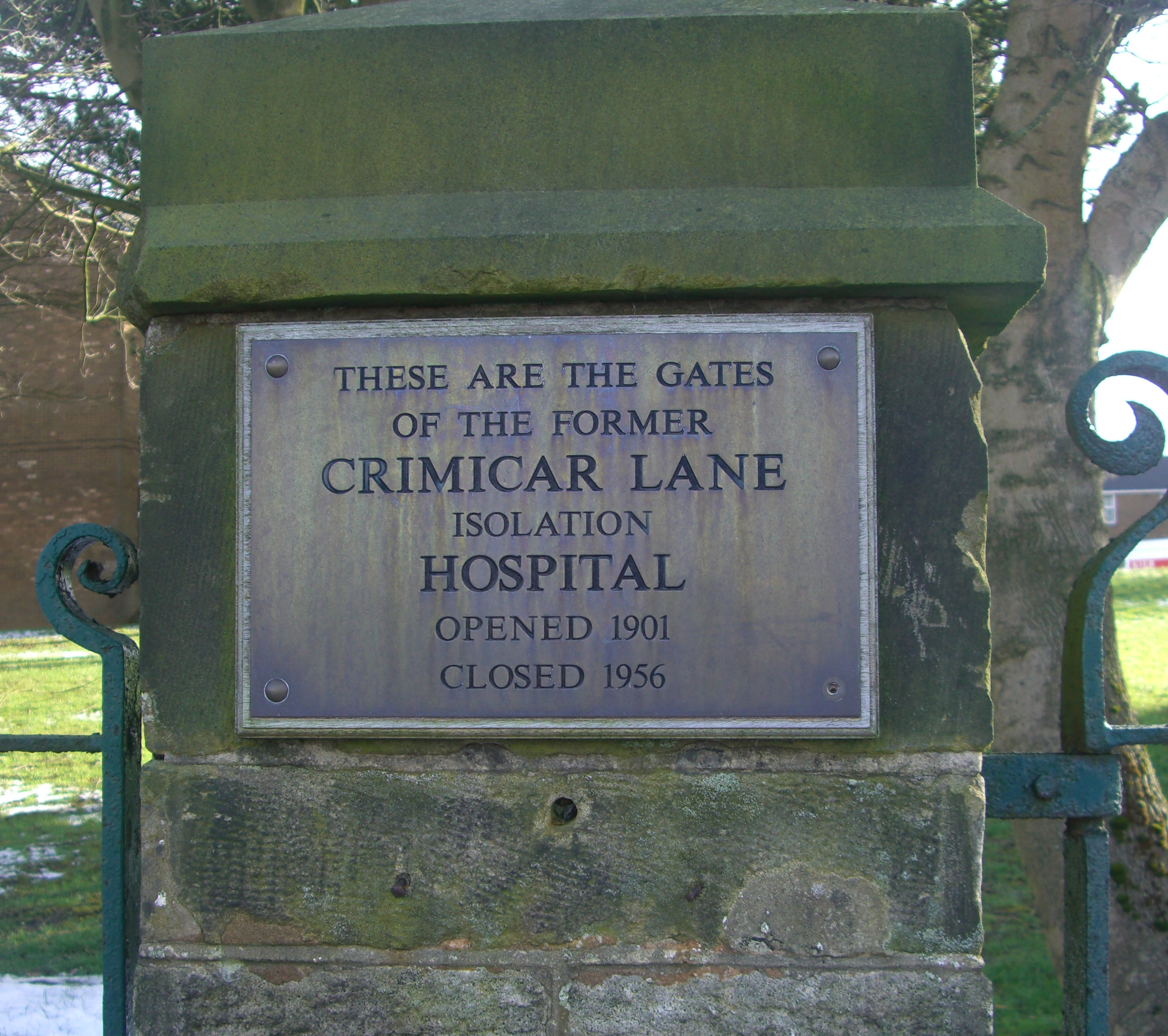
- Plaque commemorating the site of the hospital

- Shown in South Yorkshire

Geography
- Location: Sheffield, South Yorkshire, England, United Kingdom
- Coordinates: 53.372455°N 1.554882°W

Organisation
- Care system: Public NHS
- Type: Isolation

History
- Founded: 1902
- Closed: 1956

Links
- Lists: Hospitals in England

Crimicar Lane Hospital and Sanatorium was an isolation hospital for sufferers of smallpox and tuberculosis in the City of Sheffield, England. It was situated in the suburb of Lodge Moor. The hospital opened in 1902 and closed in 1956.

== History ==
The hospital was opened in November 1902 by the Hospitals Committee of Sheffield Corporation as a facility for the treatment of smallpox, it consisted of two 21-bed wards, an eight bedded isolation block, administration building and a building for disinfecting and laundering garments. Prior to the First World War almost all admissions were smallpox cases. However, a successful vaccination programme saw the number of patients drop significantly as the disease was almost eradicated. This led to Crimicar Lane admitting increasing numbers of tuberculosis and silicosis cases, many of which were connected with Sheffield's cutlery industry, which used grindstones and buffing wheels for polishing, creating a large amount of gritty dust which caused respiratory diseases.

During the First World War the hospital was partly used to accommodate injured soldiers and a temporary wooden ward was erected to provide the extra space needed. In 1948, with the establishment of the NHS, the hospital was transferred to Sheffield No 3 Hospital Management Committee of Sheffield Regional Hospital Board (SRHB).

In 1955 the Board recommended that Crimicar Lane should no longer be used as a hospital and the tuberculosis Huts were demolished at that time. All patients were transferred to Lodge Moor Hospital on 31 May 1956. The hospital stood empty for some time before the remaining buildings were demolished to make way for the housing which now stands on Westminster Crescent. All that remains of the old hospital are the perimeter wall and the main gates which have a memorial plaque attached to them.

== See also ==
- List of hospitals in England
