= Jethro Mutti =

Zambian politician

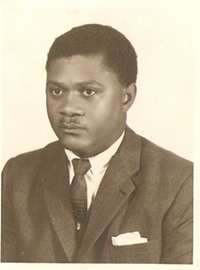

Member of the Central Committee (MCC)UNIP
- In office 1973–1975
- President: Kenneth Kaunda

Cabinet Minister for North Western province Zambia
- In office 1971–1973

Minister of State for Rural Development Zambia
- In office 1969–1971

Member of Parliament (Zambia) for Livingstone
- In office 1968–1971

Zambian Ambassador to Ethiopia
- In office 1967–1969

Parliamentary Secretary (Ministry of Information Services)
- In office 1964–1967

Member of Parliament (Zambia) for Mankoya now Kaoma
- In office 1964–1968

Personal details
- Born: Jethro Mukenge Mutti; 3 May 1934 Kaba Hill Mission, near Mankoya now Kaoma, Northern Rhodesia
- Spouse: Masiliso Mutti (m. 1964)
- Occupation: Politician

Jethro Mukenge Mutti (3 May 1934 – 18 January 2013), was a Zambian politician who between the years 1964 to 1975 served as member of parliament, Ambassador, Minister and Member of the Central Committee under the ruling party UNIP led by Kenneth Kaunda. He died on 18 January 2013 after complications from aspiration pneumonia following a series of mini strokes and poor health in the last few years of his life, linked to his tetraplegic condition.

Not in favour of the "one party democracy" policy adopted by UNIP, Jethro Mutti resigned from office in April 1975 to become a business man. In September 1975, he was involved in a vehicle accident which left him with severe spinal injuries. He was transferred from the University Teaching Hospital (UTH) in Lusaka and flown to Lodge Moor Hospital, Sheffield, UK for specialist treatment. After 6 months of treatment and rehabilitation at Lodge Moor hospital he returned to Zambia to live life as a tetraplegic.

== Early life and education background ==
Jethro Mukenge Mutti was born in 1934 at Kaba Hill Mission located near Luampa in Barotseland a protectorate of Northern Rhodesia. He was educated at Luampa Mission Primary School, Mankoya Upper School and Kambule Secondary School located in Barotseland. After his secondary school education, he worked as a clerk for the Northern Rhodesia Public Works Department (PWD) from 1956 to 1960. Mutti first became active in politics in the late 1950s much to the displeasure of the colonial authorities who tried to have him removed from the area.

== Independence struggle ==
In 1960, he resigned from his job at PWD to join UNIP as a full-time party organiser in Mongu, Barotseland (now Western Province, Zambia). Mutti persuaded Sikota Wina to travel to Kalabo, Senanga and Mwandi where they held rallies gaining further support for UNIP and persuading the locals to buy UNIP cards. Some of the areas Mutti and Sikota travelled to were impassable by car due to floods, they abandoned the car they used for travelling and proceeded on foot to reach their destinations. The Northern Rhodesia colonial ruling authorities who were hostile to UNIP organisers in Barotseland attempted to have him "deported" from Barotseland but he defied the order.

In August 1961, Mr Mutti was beaten up by colonial police officers at Lusaka Police Station for his involvement with the campaign for constitutional change to bring in a majority African government. He sustained a ruptured ear drum but no action was taken against the police officer who had injured Mutti. One of his colleagues reportedly had his skull fractured. Mr Mutti subsequently brought a personal civil suit against the police officer but he was acquitted. Mutti was then charged with perjury and sentenced to 18 months imprisonment. He appealed and was released from prison after serving two weeks of the sentence.

He resumed work as an UNIP organiser in Mongu after the government ban against the party was lifted in 1962.

In January 1964, Northern Rhodesia saw its first majority black member parliament in the general elections; Mutti was elected MP for Mankoya (now Kaoma) representing UNIP. In May 1964 he was part of a delegation representing Zambia at the second OAU Summit in Cairo.

== After independence ==
Mutti's first appointment to the newly formed Zambian government after independence on 24 October 1964, was as Parliamentary Secretary in the Ministry of Information Postal Services, serving under Lewis Changufu who was minister. In 1967 he was appointed ambassador to Ethiopia. In 1968 he briefly returned to Zambia to stand for a parliamentary seat in Livingstone in the 1968 presidential and general elections which he subsequently won. The Livingstone seat had previously been held by Mainza Chona (UNIP) who in the 1964 general elections had won the seat by the election's lowest majority of 483. Fearful that the Livingstone seat would be lost to ANC, UNIP asked Mutti to stand for the Livingstone seat instead while Chona was sent to Mutti's former Kaoma constituency which Mutti had comfortably won in 1964. In 1969 he returned to Zambia from Ethiopia, to take up office as Minister of State for Rural Development. In April 1969, during his parliamentary maiden speech Mr Mutti caused an uproar in parliament when he called on Zambian Ministers to give up their luxury cars, claiming that Zambian Ministers were the highest paid in Africa. He was heavily barracked by UNIP members during the course of his speech. The president intervened and reprimanded Mr Mutti for his "anti-UNIP attitude". He was asked to apologise and withdraw his remarks which Mr Mutti refused to do. A few days later he announced he was resigning as MP & Minister of State but Mr Mutti rescinded his decision after being asked to stay on by supporters in his constituency and other supporters.

== The Second Republic ==
Jethro Mutti was elected as a Member of the Central Committee (MCC) Zambia's Second Republic which was inaugurated on 1 January 1973, with the adoption of a new constitution centred on a "one-party participatory democracy". Jethro was known for his opposition to the practice of a one party state politics which he challenged but was obliged to toe the line. In 1974 he was re-elected to the central committee but was increasingly unhappy about how the country was being run as a one party state and dictatorship intolerant of any opposition or differing opinions. In April 1975, he resigned from government and UNIP unhappy with how the country was being run.

== After Retirement ==
In September 1975, Jethro was involved in a serious road traffic accident which left him with C2/C3 spinal cord injuries. He was transferred from UTH to Lodge Moor Hospital, Sheffield for specialist treatment. After six months of treatment and rehabilitation he returned to Zambia as a tetraplegic. Supported and cared for by his wife, Masiliso who worked full-time as a matron at UTH, Jethro started rebuilding his life at the family home in Lusaka.

He remained active, interested and involved in Zambian politics. Between 1980 and mid 1990s he painstakingly used one finger on a typewriter to write numerous letters to the local newspapers voicing his opposition to the one party state leadership. Most of these letters were never published as the media was controlled by the then ruling party UNIP, but a few saw their way through. Undeterred Mr Mutti begun to write his memoirs using his typewriter.

Jethro Mutti advocated political pluralism in Zambia and was consulted by the Movement for Multiparty Democracy (MMD) party leader Frederick Chiluba during the campaign for Zambia to change and become a multiparty state. In October 1990, he was nominated for a state honour by President Kenneth Kaunda which he rejected in protest against what he said was "the degeneration of Zambian politics into a personality cult centred around the President under a one-party state". Mr Mutti was one of 54 politicians past and present to have been honoured by President Kaunda on African Freedom Day investiture ceremony. He was to have been bestowed with the order of the grand companion of freedom third division. In a newspaper interview reporting on his rejection of the state honour Mr Mutti publicly offered his support to MMD stating " I may be physically handicapped but I am mentally sound and can stand, shout slogans and address a public rally for hours".

In 1990 he testified before the constitutional commission which was receiving submissions on the mode of constitution adoption for Zambia suggesting that parliament rather than the president should invoke the state of emergency to avoid the abuse of power by any individual in leadership. In the run up to the 1991 elections, along with his wife Masiliso, he campaigned at MMD rallies rallying support for MMD candidate at his first constituency in Kaoma which by now was divided into three constituencies (Kaoma Central, Mangango and Luampa).

On 19 September 1991, he wrote an open letter to President Kaunda published in the Weekly Post calling for the removal of UNIP political appointees from the country's administrative arms as a prelude to the creation of a suitable atmosphere necessary for conducting free and fair multi-party elections. On 31 October 1991 the MMD party came into power with a landslide victory over UNIP and Kenneth Kaunda who had ruled Zambia since 1964.

In 1994 Jethro and his wife Masiliso moved to Mutti's home village near Kaoma to farm. Jethro and Masiliso lived on their farm in Kaoma until 2011 when Jethro's poor health forced the couple to return to Lusaka for treatment.
