= Fulwood (ward), South Yorkshire =

Electoral ward in the City of Sheffield, South Yorkshire, England

Coordinates: 53.365°N 1.544°W

Fulwood
- Shown within Sheffield
- Population: 18,233 (2011 census)
- Metropolitan borough: City of Sheffield
- Metropolitan county: South Yorkshire
- Region: Yorkshire and the Humber
- Country: England
- Sovereign state: United Kingdom
- UK Parliament: Sheffield Hallam
- Councillors: Sue Alston (Liberal Democrats); Andrew Sangar MBE (Liberal Democrats); Cliff Woodcraft (Liberal Democrats)

Fulwood ward—which includes the districts of Fulwood, Lodge Moor, and Ranmoor—is one of the 28 electoral wards in the City of Sheffield, England. It is located in the far western part of the city and covers an area of 23.2 km^{2}. The population of this ward in 2011 was 18,233 people in 6,476 households. Fulwood ward is one of the five wards that make up the Sheffield Hallam Parliamentary constituency. As of June 2022, Andrew Sangar, Sue Alston, and Cliff Woodcraft, all Liberal Democrats, were councillors for the ward. The current Member of Parliament is Labour's Olivia Blake.

== Geography ==
Fulwood ward is located on the hills that overlook Sheffield from the west, it is bordered to the north by the River Rivelin and to the south by the Porter Brook. The western part of the ward is rural including parts of the Hallam Moors and the Peak District National Park. Its western boundary is Stanage, which is also the western boundary of the City of Sheffield.

== History ==
Fulwood ward was created when Sheffield's electoral wards were redrawn in June 2004, prior to that most of the Fulwood ward was the old Hallam ward — created in 1934 when the Ecclesall Bierlow ward was subdivided. It covers most of the area that was Upper Hallam—one of the six townships that made up ancient parish of Sheffield. This area was sparsely populated well into the 19th century. In 1811 there were only 866 residents in its 8,836 acres (36 km^{2}). A description of Sheffield from 1832 describes the area as "wild and dreary, with a population scanty in the extreme". Redmires Road, which runs from the Long Causway near Redmires Reservoirs across the ward to Crookes, was thought to follow the course of a Roman road that ran from Templeborough to Brough-on-Noe. It is now thought to be a medieval road used as a saltway used to transport salt from Cheshire to Yorkshire. The traffic is thought to have continued into the 18th century. This road passes Hallam Head, which some have suggested may be the site of the village of Hallam and therefore possibly the Aula of Waltheof mentioned in the Domesday Book of 1086 (note, however, that most historians believe that this Aula was in Sheffield, where Sheffield Castle once stood).

== Districts of Fulwood ward ==
=== Fulwood ===
Fulwood (grid reference SK303858) is a suburb of Sheffield. In ancient times this area was part of a large forest—the name Fulwood means a wet, marshy woodland. In Mediaeval times it formed part of Rivelin Firth, the hunting chase of the Lords of the Manor of Sheffield. It developed into a wealthy residential district in the 19th century and many houses from this period still exist. Amongst the historic buildings in Fulwood are the Old Chapel, which was built in 1729 (the old village stocks still stand outside this church), Fulwood Hall, built in 1620 and Stumperlowe Hall. According to the Indices of Deprivation 2007, the district of Fulwood (i.e. Fulwood village as opposed to the ward as a whole, which is a much larger area) is the second-least deprived area of the city after Ecclesall. Fulwood had a population of 3,608 in 2011.

=== Ranmoor ===
Ranmoor (grid reference SK317862) is a suburb of Sheffield just to the east of Fulwood notable for its large church, St John's. This church was opened 24 April 1879 but was almost entirely destroyed by fire on 2 January 1887. All that survived from the original church was the tower and spire, which still stands today. A new building was built and the church reopened on 9 September 1888.

=== Lodge Moor ===
Lodge Moor (grid reference SK291861) is a suburb of Sheffield to the west of Fulwood. It lies on the edge of open countryside and is home to a large golf course.

==== Hospital ====
The hospital was founded in 1888 and closed in the 1990s. On 9 December 1955 a USAF Republic F-84 Thunderstreak crashed into the hospital, killing one person and injuring seven.

==== Prisoner of war camp ====
There was a prisoner of war camp here in the First World War and the Second World War, a notable prisoner held from 1918 to 1919 was then U-boat captain Karl Dönitz, whom Hitler later chose as his successor to the position of Führer, a position which Dönitz fulfilled in the last days of the Second World War. To the west of Lodge Moor is the area of Redmires and the Redmires Reservoirs, the Sheffield City Battalion had a camp and training area here during the First World War. There was also a First World War air landing site next to the camp, used by aircraft to defend Sheffield against Zeppelin raids, but it was only used until 1916. Near the site of the hospital, there were three Bronze Age barrows, which were removed to make way for housing development. One of these was excavated in the 1950s by the Hunter Archaeological Society.
