= Lodge Moor Hospital =

- Central Sheffield University Hospitals NHS Trust
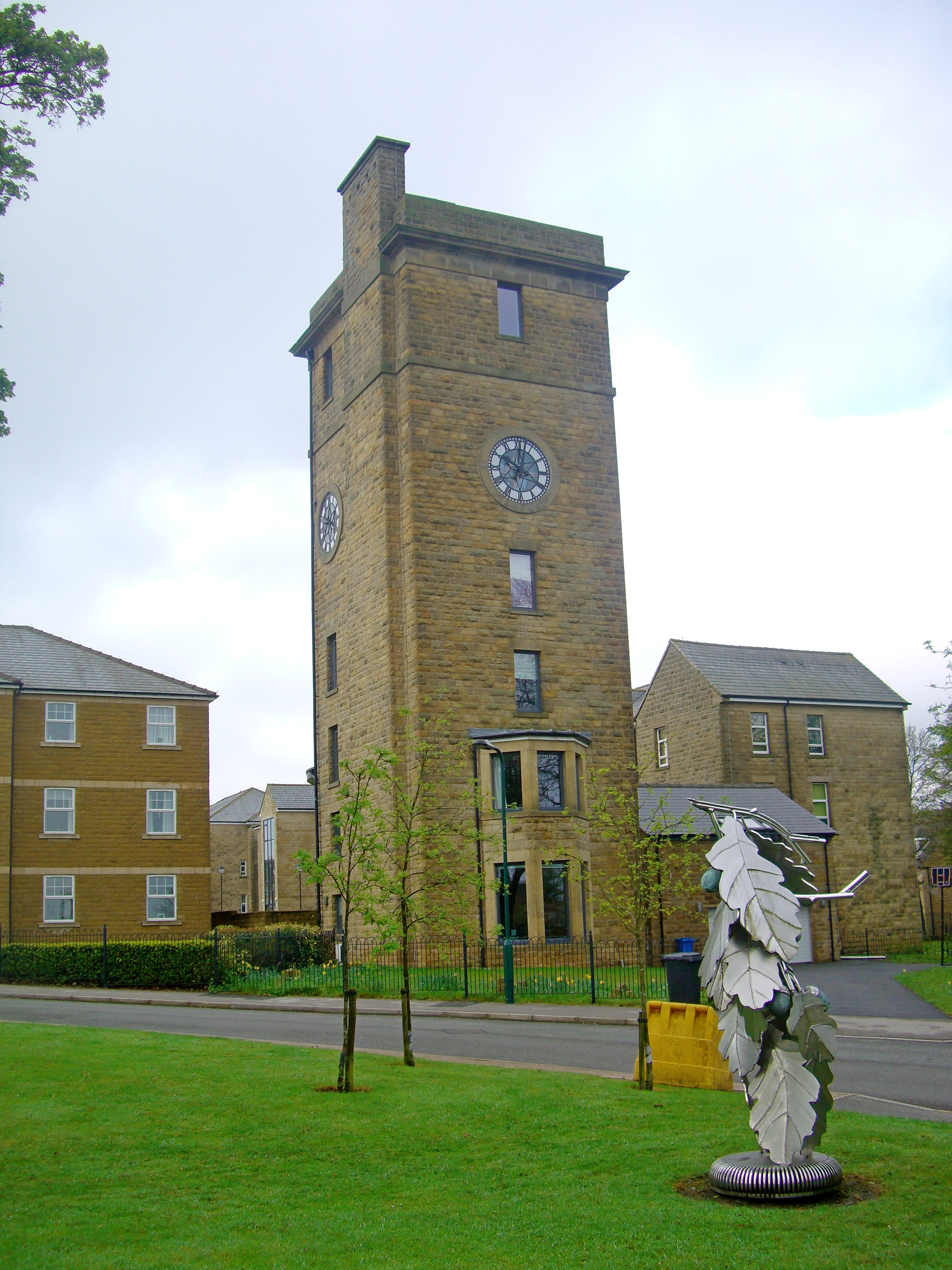
- The former tower at the hospital which has been converted into apartments within a new housing development

- Shown in South Yorkshire

Geography
- Location: Lodge Moor
- Coordinates: 53.371762°N 1.570859°W

Organisation
- Care system: Public NHS
- Type: Isolation

History
- Founded: 1888
- Closed: 1994

Lodge Moor Hospital is a former isolation hospital on Redmires Road in the Lodge Moor area of the City of Sheffield, England. The hospital which opened in 1888 and closed in 1994 initially treated Smallpox but soon broadened its treatment to other infectious diseases and in its latter years expanded to provide more general nursing, notably spinal injuries and chest medicine. At the time of closure, the hospital was operated by the Central Sheffield University Hospitals NHS Trust.

== History ==
Lodge Moor hospital was erected as a result of the Sheffield smallpox epidemic of 1887–1888. Despite the increasing number of vaccinations, the disease remained virulent and the one way of keeping it in check was to isolate those with the disease from the healthy members of society. With this in mind Sheffield Corporation sought permission of the Local Government Board to borrow £12,000 to build an isolation hospital. The Board granted the request and the Council appointed the building contractors W. Bissett & Sons to build the hospital on an area of rough moorland called Lodge Moor on the western outskirts of the city. The hospital was deliberately sited in an area of high altitude, 950 feet (290 metres) above sea level, as it was believed this would provide the necessary fresh air for patients.

The smallpox epidemic stressed the importance of building the hospital quickly and a working party of 300 were set to work around the clock, within two months twelve wards had been erected to house 156 patients. Each of these wards were made from wood and were viewed as just temporary structures, they could accommodate ten patients and had a composting toilet, storeroom and a bedroom for a nurse. In 1892 the first stone wards were built although it would be 1935 before the temporary wooden huts would be removed. By the turn of the century the diminishing number of smallpox patients due to widespread vaccination made it possible for Lodge Moor to admit patients with other contagious diseases such as scarlet fever, diphtheria and typhoid fever. Further expansion to the hospital completed in 1905 saw the addition of the six South wards, the main lodge, waiting room and the square tower which is a conspicuous landmark in the surrounding area.

The 1918 flu pandemic and the ensuing vastly increased number of admissions, severely overstretched the hospital's capacity and it was only the assistance of voluntary nurses which allowed the regular staff to cope. By the early 1920s the hospital could accommodate 434 patients. 1925 saw a severe outbreak of smallpox and Lodge Moor was stretched to overcapacity, so much so that the nearby Redmires Army Camp was utilised as an Auxiliary Hospital for isolation cases, using staff and equipment borrowed from Lodge Moor. Redmires Camp Hospital remained in use until around 1935.

1928 saw further expansion to Lodge Moor with the central 5 and 6 wards and a separation ward built at a cost of £53,000. In 1935 the North 5 and 6 wards were built and the temporary wooden huts, which had served since 1888, were burnt down under the supervision of the Fire Brigade. By 1950 the hospital could accommodate 508 infectious disease patients, in 1953 three wards were converted to a Paraplegic Unit and in 1954 the hospital took on the role of treating the spinal injuries (from road crashes and pit and factory accidents) for the whole of the Sheffield Regional Hospital Board area. In May 1956 the patients from Crimicar Lane Hospital and Commonside Sanatorium were transferred to Lodge Moor when those units were closed by the Sheffield Regional Hospital Board.

=== 1955 jet crash ===
On 9 December 1955 the hospital was hit by a Republic F-84F Thunderstreak aircraft of the United States Air Force. The aircraft had taken off from RAF Sculthorpe in Norfolk on an instrument training flight and had experienced a flameout, a problem which dogged the aircraft throughout its career. Despite several attempts to restart the engine, the pilot, Roy G. Evans bailed out over the Derbyshire village of Hathersage leaving the aircraft to carry on in flight and hit Lodge Moor Hospital. The aircraft hit the North 1 and 2 wards, tearing the roof off a single story cubicle ward, demolishing a corridor, ploughing 200 feet through a sanitary block, and then bursting into flames on a lawn facing the mortuary. The crash killed one patient, Mrs. Elsie Murdoch of Sheffield and injured seven others.

=== Modern times ===
Operation of the hospital was transferred from the Sheffield Health Authority (dissolved on 1 April 1992) to the newly created Central Sheffield University Hospitals NHS Trust on 1 November 1991, who continued to operate the hospital until its closure. Shortly after its formation, the Trust decided to merge the operations of Lodge Moor Hospital, located on the outskirts of the city, into its existing sites closer to the city centre. Subsequently, the hospital was closed in September 1994; the infectious diseases and tropical medicine service was moved to the Royal Hallamshire Hospital, while the chest and spinal injuries units were moved to the Northern General Hospital. The main hospital building including the tower has now been integrated into private residential accommodation built by the developers David Wilson Homes.

== See also ==
- List of hospitals in England
