= John George Graves =

British politician (1866–1945)

John George Graves (1866–1945) was a successful English entrepreneur and public benefactor. He became Sheffield's Lord Mayor and an Alderman in 1926 and he was given Freedom of the City in 1929. He was born in Lincolnshire in 1866 and died in 1945, having settled in Sheffield.

== Early life ==
Graves was born in Horncastle, Lincolnshire on the 22nd August 1866, the eldest of three children of Thomas and Julia Graves. When he was 8 years old, the family moved to Heckmondwyke, where his father operated a butchers shop.

He attended Batley Grammar School until the age of fourteen, before moving to Sheffield.

== Career ==
Graves moved to Sheffield to become an apprentice watchmaker. He was apprenticed to W. Wichman of Gibraltar Street. He then set up one of Britain's first mail order businesses, selling first watches and then a wide range of goods. The company employed, at its peak, 3,000 people in Sheffield and had an annual turnover of £1 million. The company was absorbed by Great Universal Stores after Graves' death.

He married Lucy Dawson on 28 June 1891 in Crookes, Sheffield. They had one daughter, Ruth Julia.

A keen art collector, Graves donated nearly £60,000 towards the development of art galleries in Sheffield, including Sheffield Central Library, the Graves Art Gallery and the Mappin Art Gallery. He also contributed hundreds of pictures from his private collection. Between 1902 and his death in 1945, Graves lived at Riverdale House in the Ranmoor area of Sheffield. In the 1911 census he was living with his wife Lucy and daughter at The Folds, off Abbey Lane, Beauchief, Sheffield.

Graves donated over £1 million to Sheffield, including the establishment of Sheffield University's Student Union. Part of the Union building is known as the "Graves Building". He also made gifts of land to the city, including Ecclesall Woods, Tinsley playing fields, Concord Park, Blacka Moor and one of the largest plots of land he donated was named after him, Graves Park. He also gifted land known as Cliffe Park to the town of Dronfield, Derbyshire, which is roughly 2.5 miles south of Graves Park in Sheffield.

The J. G. Graves Trust, a charitable trust set up in his name, exists to the present day.
