= Stumperlowe Cottage =

Cottage in Sheffield, South Yorkshire, England

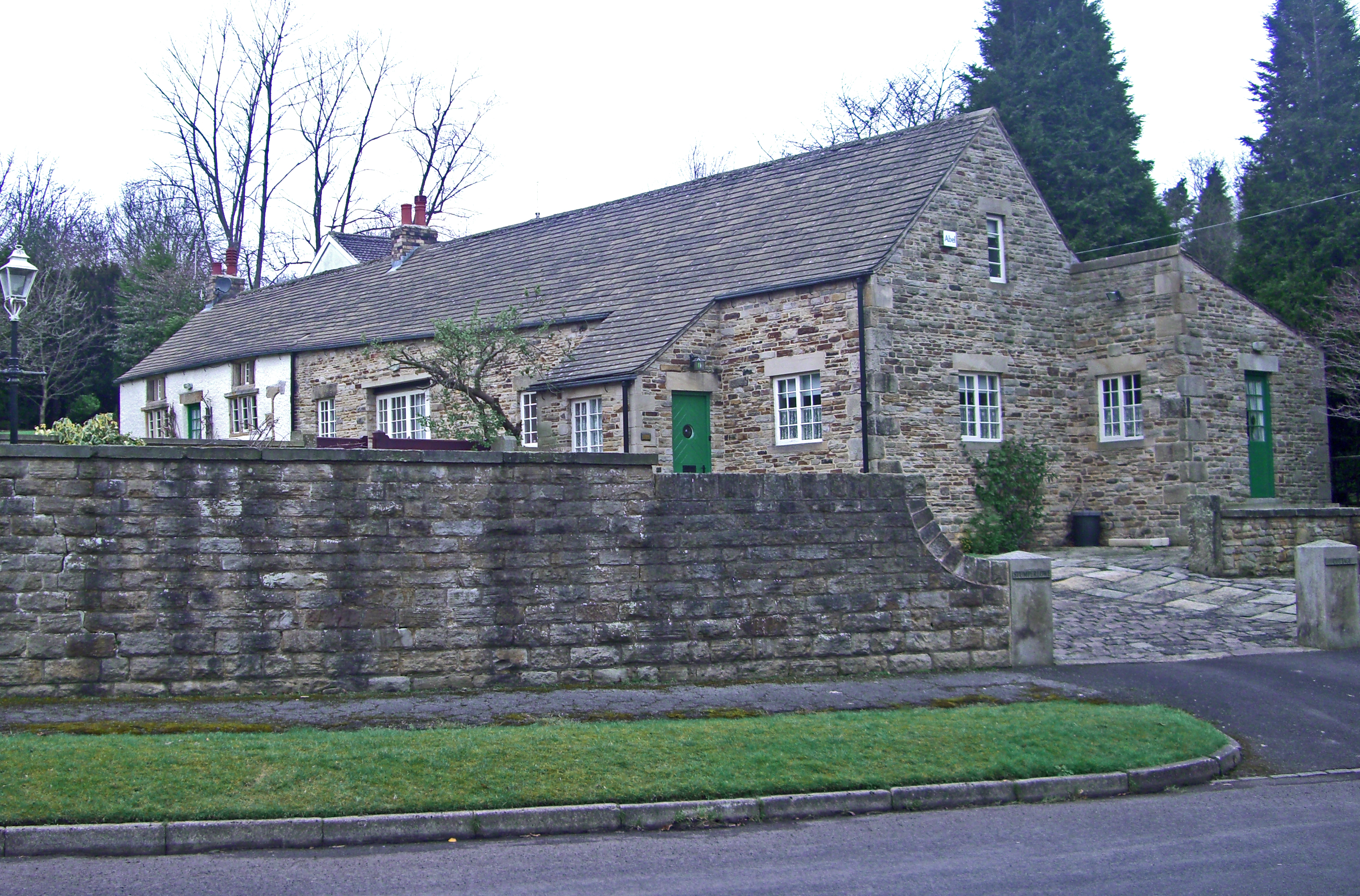
- Stumperlowe Cottage
- Interactive map of the Stumperlowe Cottage area

General information
- Architectural style: Vernacular architecture
- Location: Stumperlowe Hall Road, Fulwood, Sheffield, England
- Coordinates: 53.368106°N 1.538465°W
- Owner: Private residence

Stumperlowe Cottage is a Grade II listed building situated on Stumperlowe Hall Road in the suburb of Fulwood in Sheffield, England. It was originally a cottage with an attached barn but has now been converted into one long residential building.

== History ==
It is difficult to determine the exact age of Stumperlowe Cottage, various sources give conflicting dates for its construction and it is possible that the cottage and the cruck barn were constructed at different times. Local historian Bessie Bunker, author of the book “Cruck Buildings” states that the ancient cruck building dates from around 1400. Bunker considered the cottage to be the original Stumperlowe Hall, and was later downgraded to become a labourers cottage and attached barn when the new hall was built in the 1650s by Robert Hall. In the 15th century the cottage stood in a completely rural situation with the ancient track between Ecclesall and Hallam Head passing in front of the building, however this was built over in Victorian times as was the farms extensive lands.

=== Modern times ===
The cottage was in a ruinous state in 1968 when the last resident of the old building moved out (photograph on Picture Sheffield), the barn had lost its roof and the cruck timbers were open to the elements, the walls were held up by wooden props. Demolition of the ancient cottage seemed certain, however it was saved and protected when it was made a Grade II listed building in September 1970. The cottage was eventually purchased by Mr. & Mrs. D. Millar who were living next door, the Millars took seven years to renovate the building and moved in at Christmas 1993.

== Architecture ==
During the restoration the barns walls were completely rebuilt in coursed rubble while the cottage section at the western end was rendered and colourwashed. The remaining four cruck frames are still in place and can be seen internally. The barn is a now a large open plan living space. There is a continuous stone slate roof to the whole building, a 19th-century through-eaves box dormer window was removed from the cottage front during restoration.
