= Sheffield Botanical Gardens =

Park in Sheffield, South Yorkshire, England

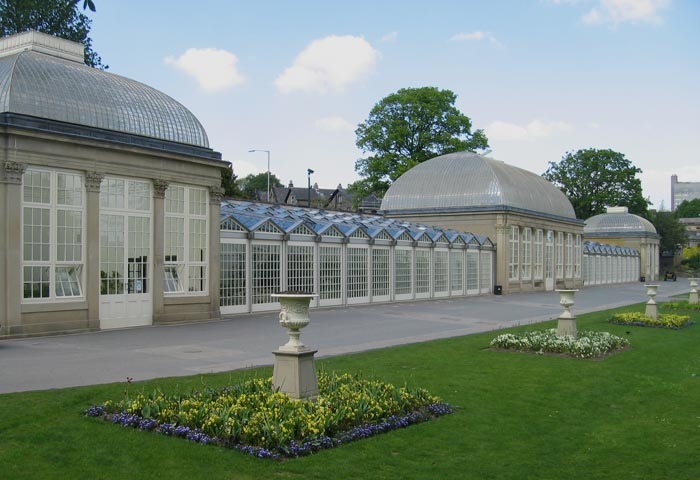
- The Glass Houses

- Location within South Yorkshire
- Type: botanical garden
- Location: Ecclesall Road in City of Sheffield, South Yorkshire, England
- Coordinates: 53°22′21″N 1°29′51″W
- Area: 19 acres (7.7 ha)
- Created: 1835–36
- Designated: Grade II listed
- Opened: 29 June 1836
- Collections: National Plant Collection of Sarcococca, Weigela and Diervilla
- Website: Sheffield Botanical Gardens website

The Sheffield Botanical Gardens are Grade II listed botanical gardens situated off Ecclesall Road in Sheffield, England, with 5,000 species of plants in 19 acres (77,000 m^{2}) of land.

== History ==
The Sheffield Botanical and Horticultural Society was formed in 1833 and by 1834 had obtained £7,500 (equivalent to £840,000 in 2025) in funding. The money was raised selling shares, permitting the purchase of 18 acres (73,000 m^{2}) of south-facing farmland from the estate of local snuff manufacturer Joseph Wilson.

The gardens were designed by Robert Marnock and first opened on 29 June 1836. The Sheffield Iris of 5 July 1836 describes the gardens thus:

The walks assume all the intricacy and mystery of a labyrinthine maze, while the monkey cages, the bear’s den, the eagles’ habitation, water-works &c. give a variety and effect to the whole, calculated to interest the visitor for hours together.

12,000 people visited the Gardens on their opening in the summer of 1836. To attract people to continue to visit the gardens, the committee organised balloon launches. The first of these took place in 1837. On Tuesday 3 October, Margaret Graham made a second ascent from the gardens. Initially it was hoped that the gas filled balloon would carry her and Mr Charles Brown, but it would not lift until Mr Brown left the basket. Mrs Graham flew alone. Once aloft she ejected a monkey with a parachute which descended successfully to the ground. Mrs Graham landed near Conisbrough with some difficulty.

Sheffield's Town Trust assumed the management of the gardens in the closing years of the 19th. century, when they repaid the shareholders the nominal value of their £5 shares. The Trust abolished the existing entry charge and since that time entry to the Botanical Gardens has remained free. Though the Town Trust are still the owners, Sheffield Corporation signed a 99-year lease on 18 December 1951, thereby taking over management.

The most notable feature of the gardens are the Grade II* listed glass pavilions by Benjamin Broomhead Taylor, restored and reopened in 2003. Other notable structures are the main gateway, the south entrance lodge and a bear pit containing an 8' tall steel statue of an American Black Bear called Robert the Bear. In the rose garden is a bronze sculpture "Pan: Spirit of the Wood", a gift in 1934 from Sir Charles Clifford, owner of the Sheffield Telegraph and Star, to the city. The sculptor is not known.

The gardens hold the national collection of the genus Sarcococca, Weigela and the closely related Diervilla.

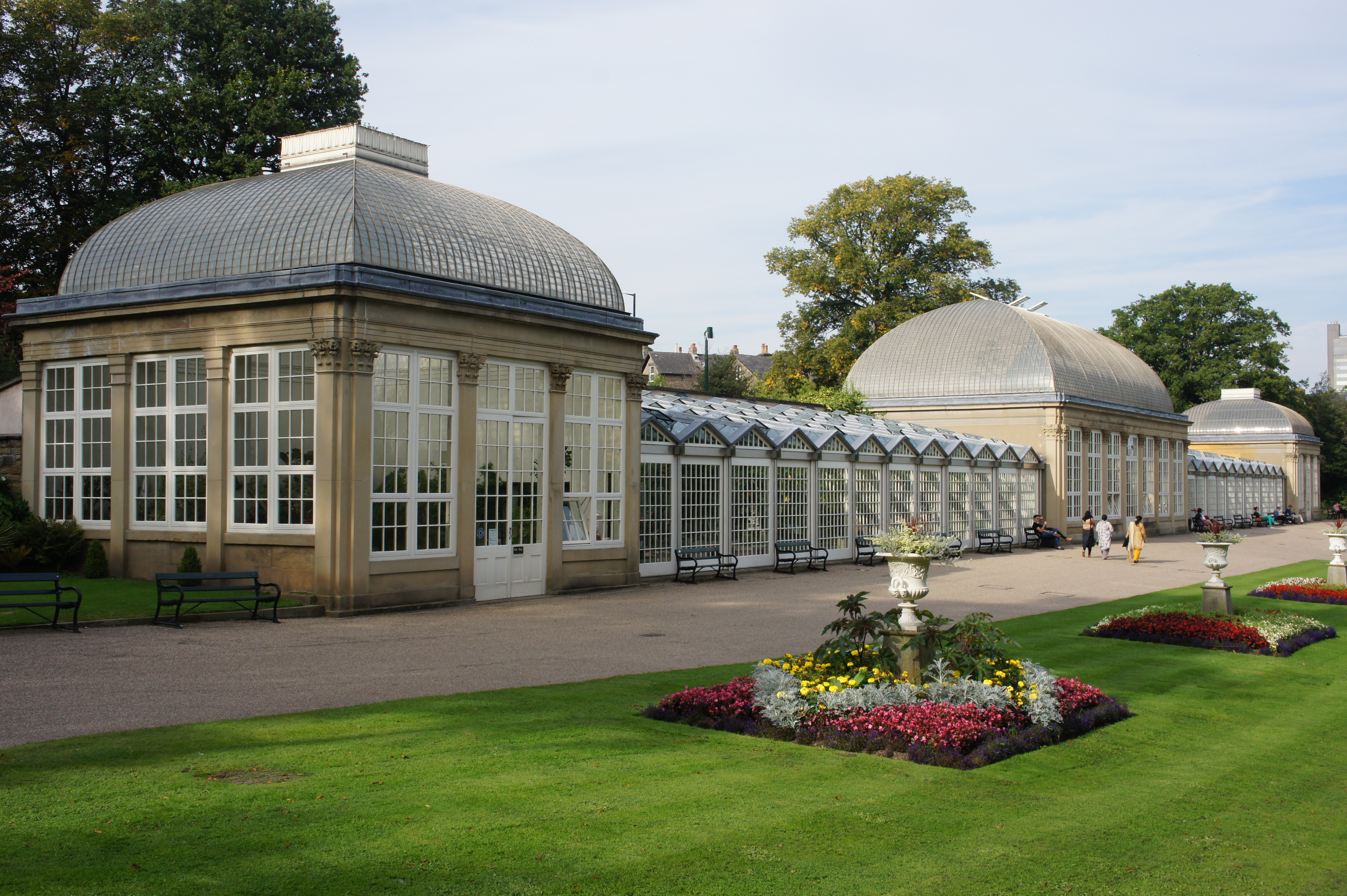
Glass Houses

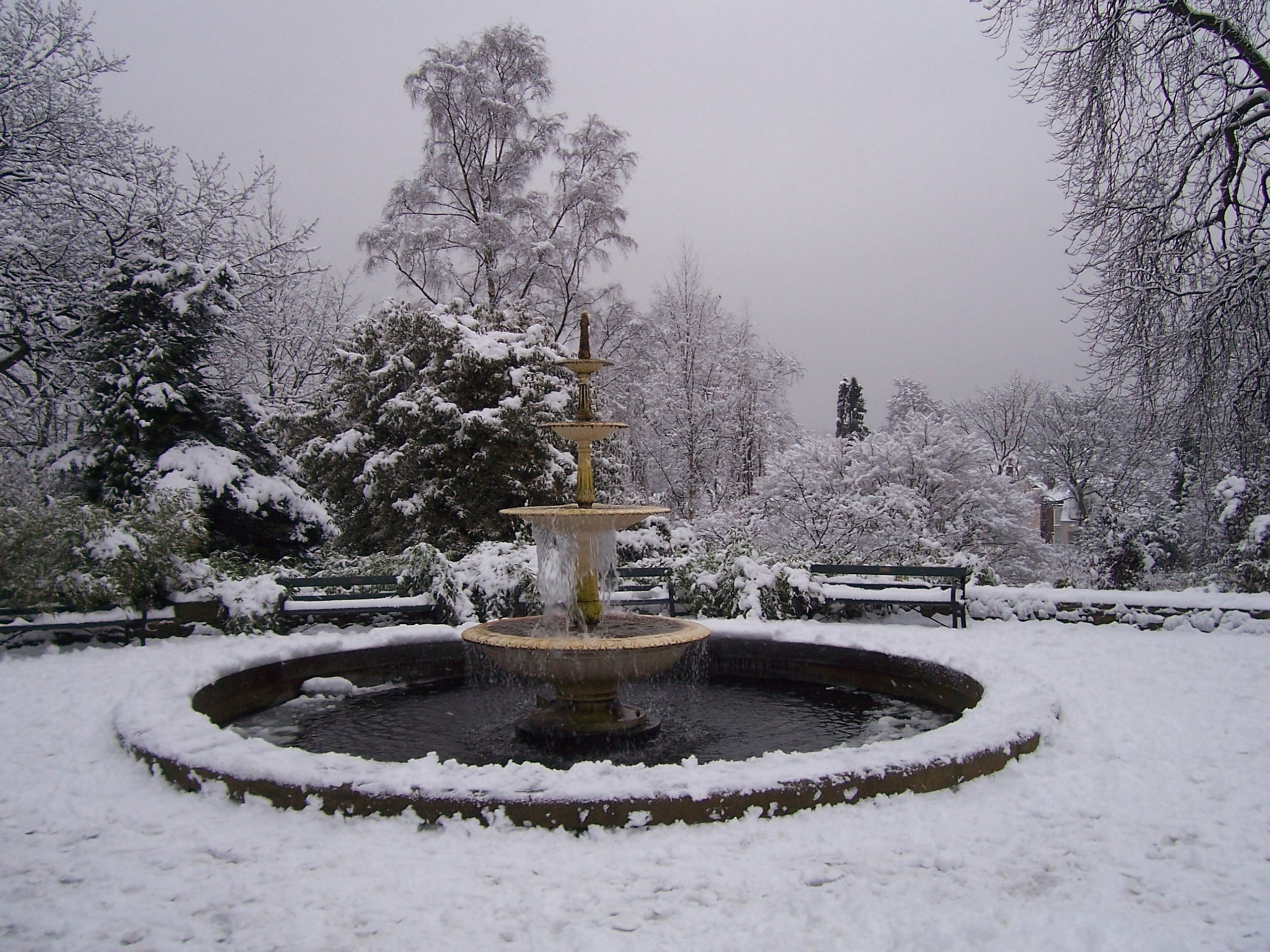
The fountain

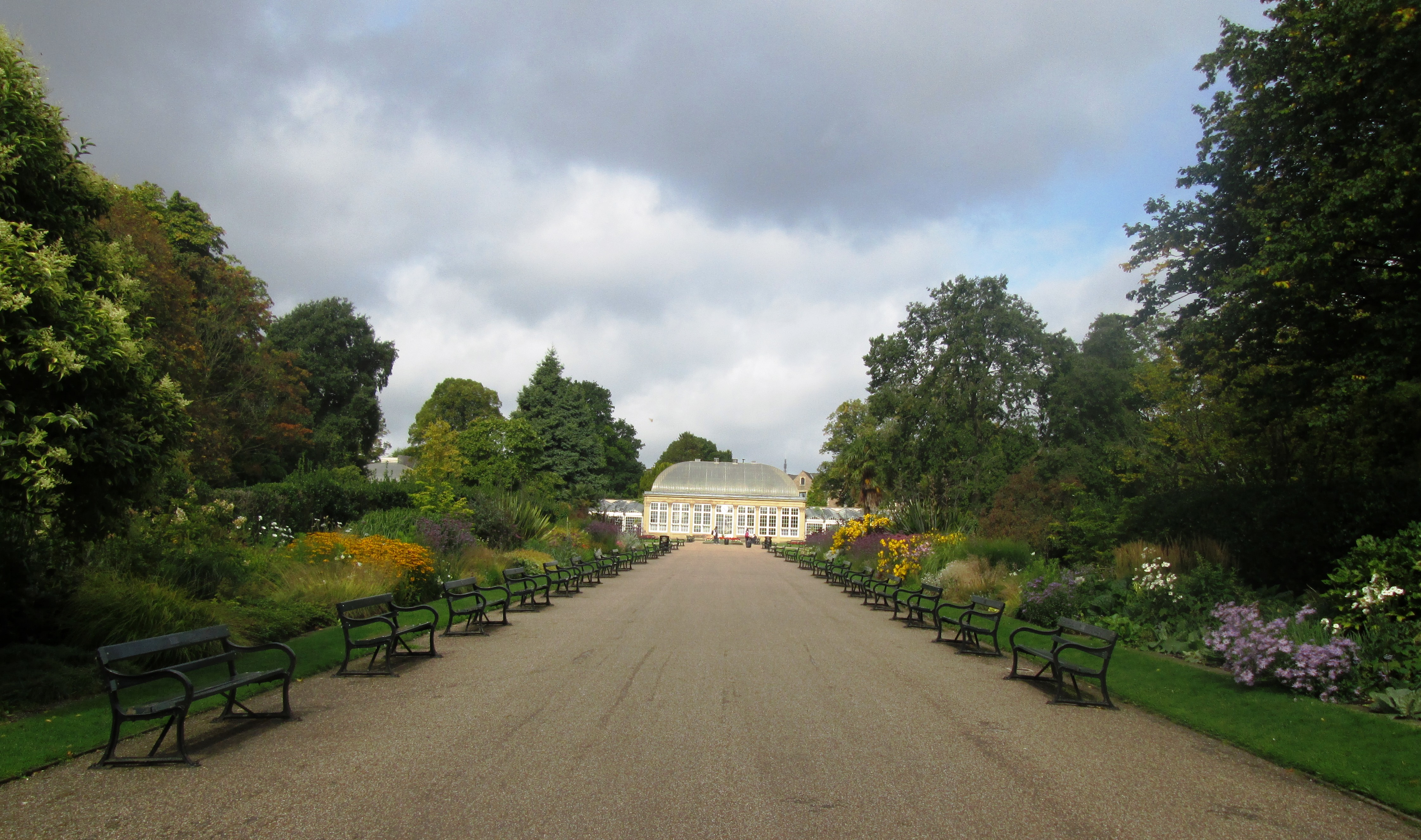
Avenue

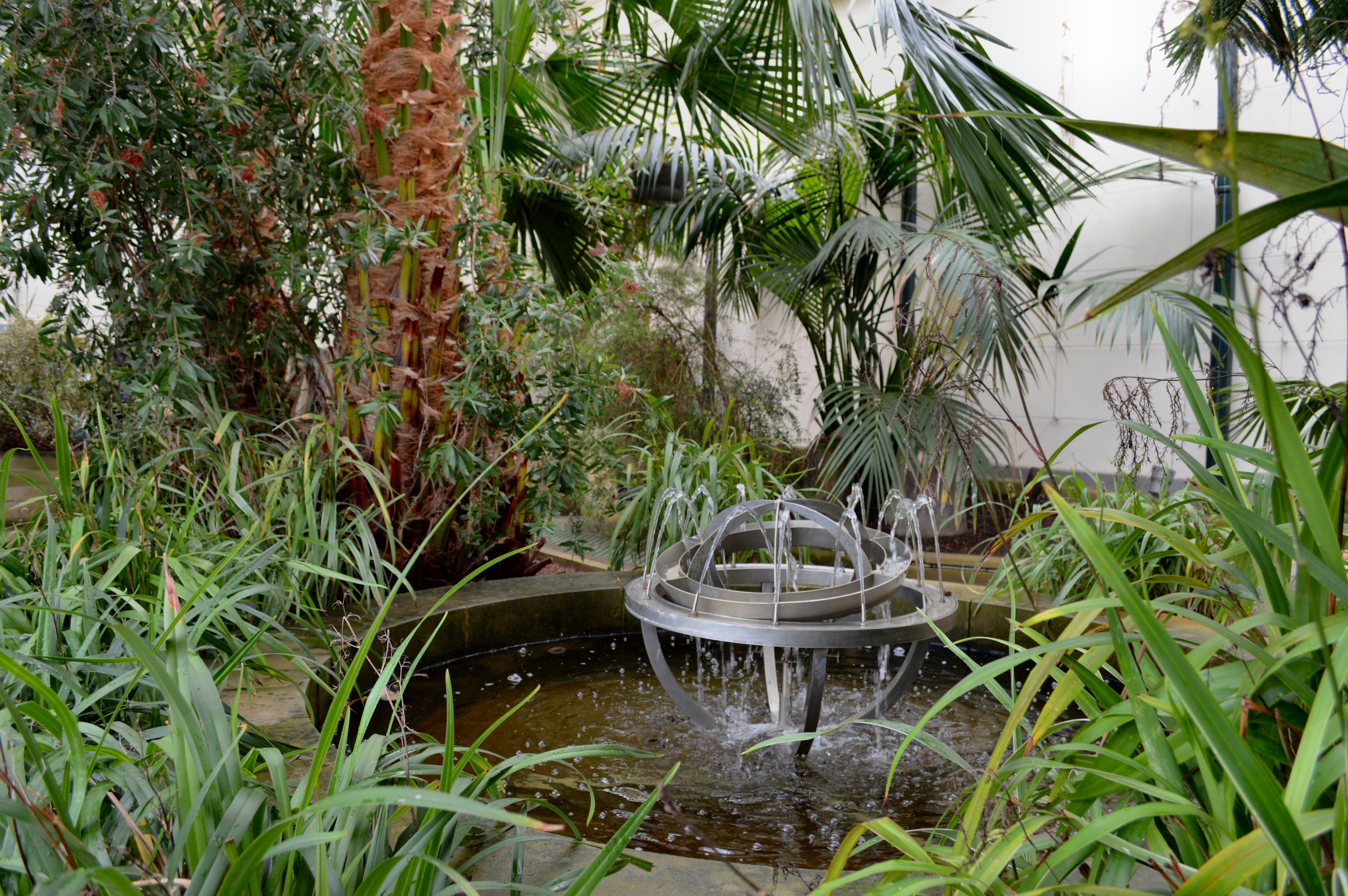
Inside glass house

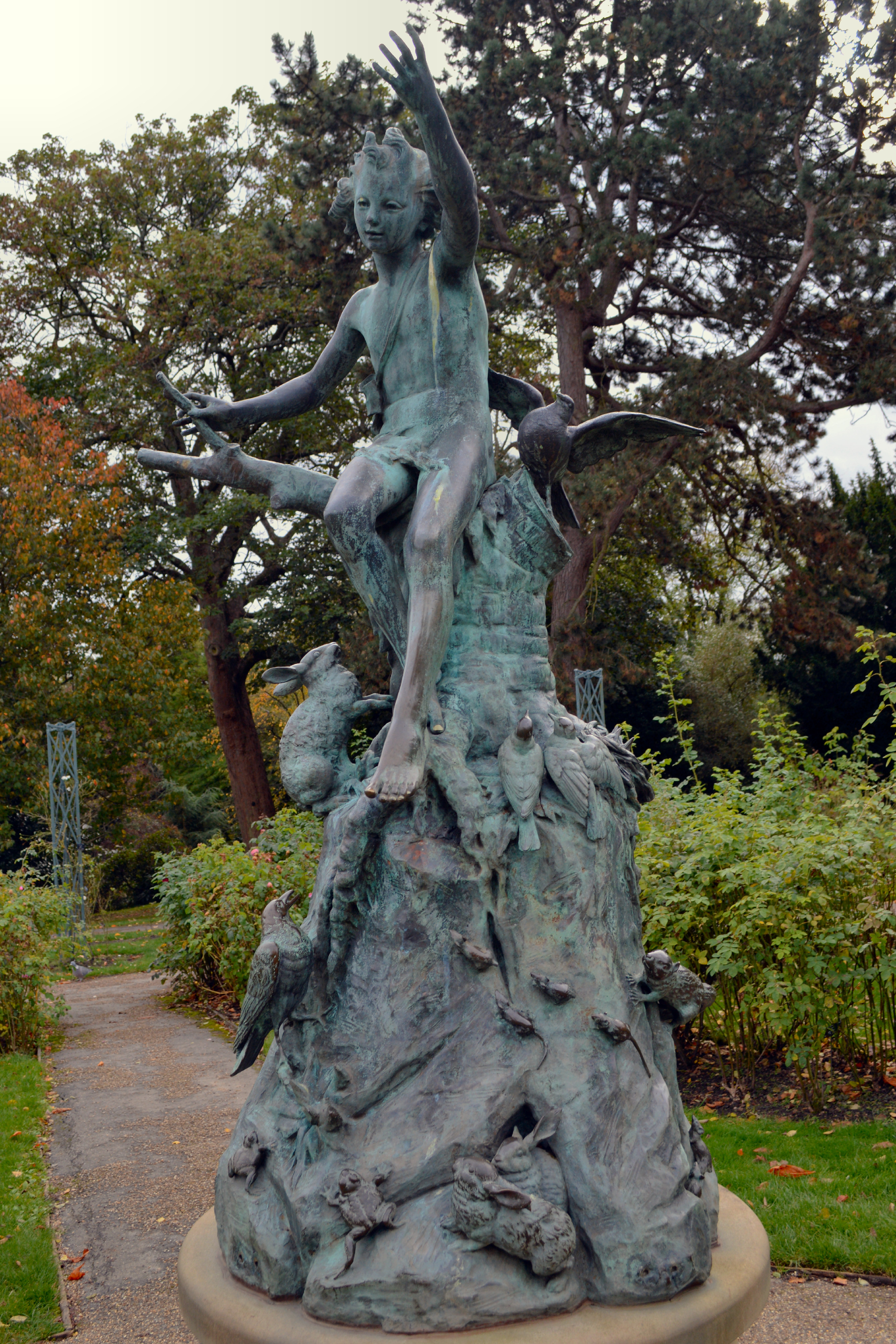
Pan: Spirit of the Wood

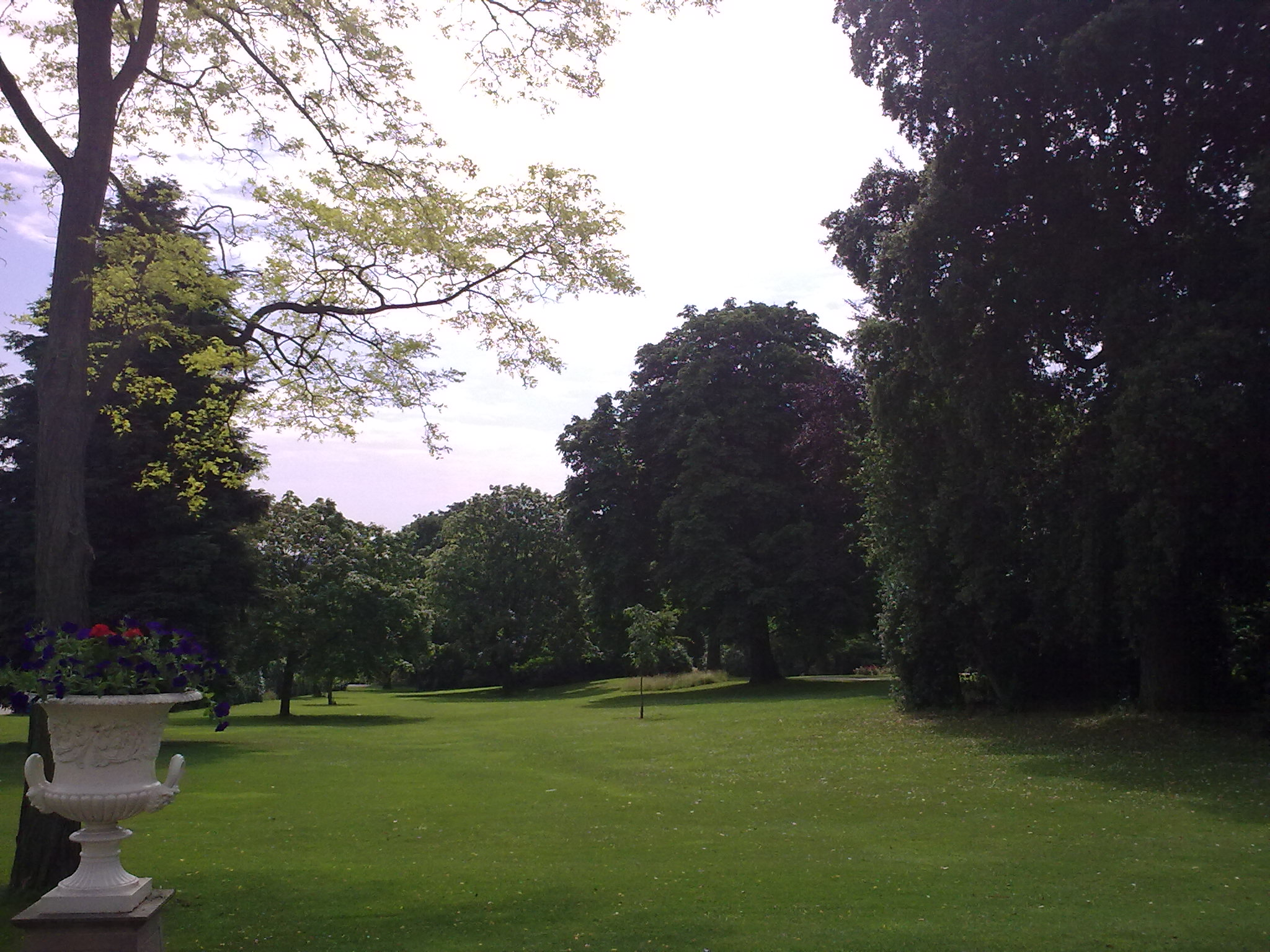
View

== In popular culture ==
Parts of the HBO miniseries The Regime were filmed at the Botanical Gardens.
