= Fulwood, Sheffield =

Suburb of Sheffield in South Yorkshire, England

Coordinates: 53.365036°N 1.5436843°W

Fulwood
- Suburb
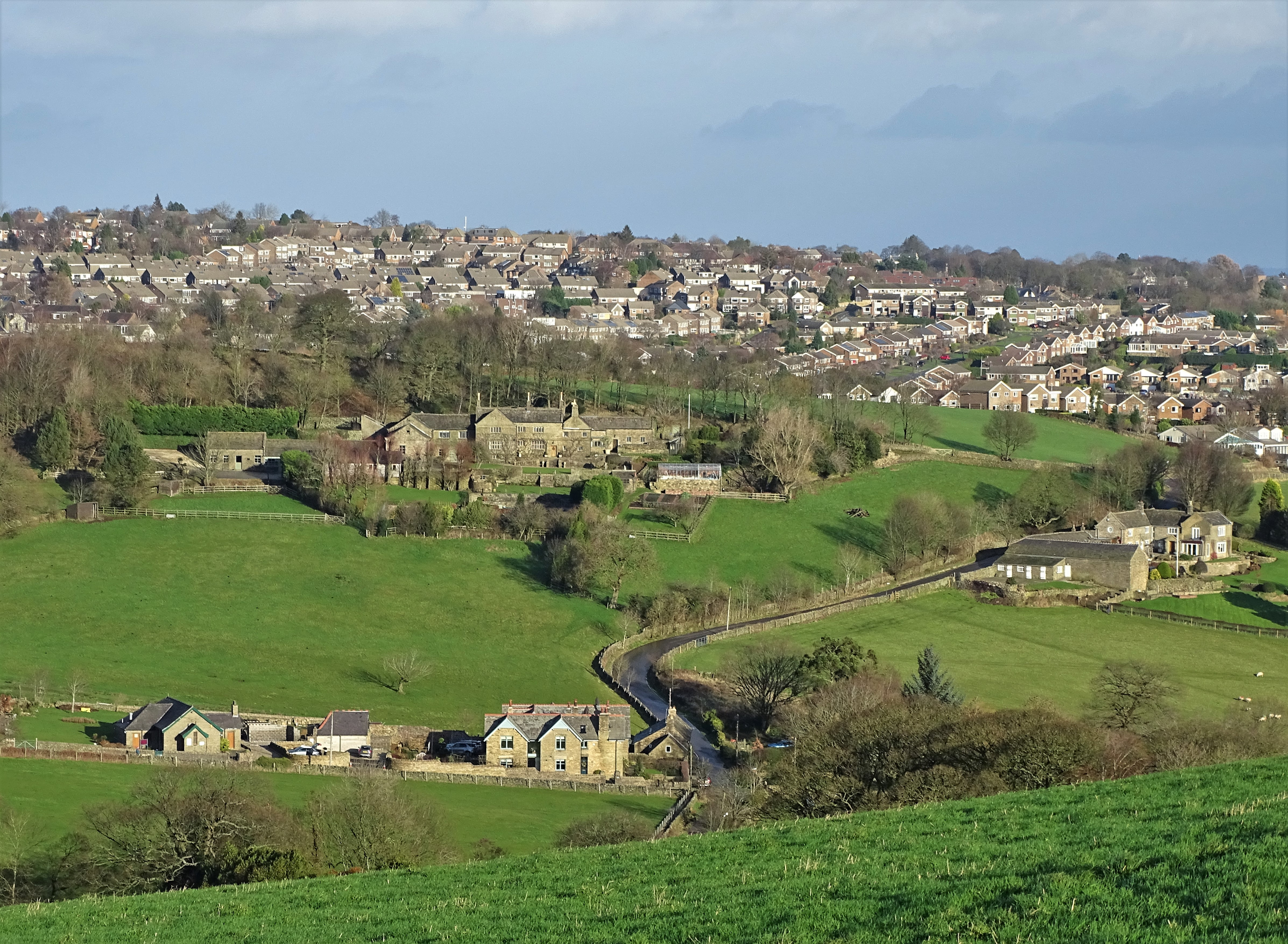
- Fulwood from Harrop Lane

- Location within South Yorkshire
- Population: 18,233 (ward. 2011)
- Metropolitan borough: Sheffield
- Metropolitan county: South Yorkshire
- Region: Yorkshire and the Humber
- Country: England
- Sovereign state: United Kingdom
- Post town: SHEFFIELD
- Postcode district: S10
- Dialling code: 0114
- Police: South Yorkshire
- Fire: South Yorkshire
- Ambulance: Yorkshire
- UK Parliament: Sheffield Hallam

Fulwood is a residential suburb and ward of the City of Sheffield in England, it lies 5.5 km west-southwest of the city centre. Formerly an ancient settlement and village on the Porter Brook, it became integrated into the city in the 1930s. It is bounded by the suburbs of Lodge Moor to the NW, Ranmoor to the east and Crosspool to the NE. The open countryside of the Peak District lies to the west and SW. The sub districts of Stumperlowe and Goole Green are part of the suburb. The population of the ward at the 2011 Census was 18,233. Fulwood is located in the Sheffield Hallam constituency.

== History ==
Fulwood was originally an Anglo-Saxon settlement, with the name originating from the Old English language “Ful Wuda” meaning a “wet, marshy woodland“. However other interpretations of the name are “foul, dirty wood” and “folks wood” from the Old English “folc”.

Prior to the Norman conquest of England Fulwood was part of the massive estate of the Anglo-Saxon Earl Waltheof. After the Earl's execution in 1076 for his part in the Revolt of the Earls, the estate was awarded to the Norman Roger de Busli. Fulwood was mentioned in a document of 1297 when Thomas de Furnival established the Burgery of Sheffield, he stated that the inhabitants of "Folewode" be granted herbage and foliage throughout the whole of Rivelin Chase. Rivelin Chase, included the Forest of Fulwood and was the common name for an area of forests and moorland used by the Lords of the Manor of Sheffield for the hunting of deer and game and the grazing of farm animals. A record of 1181 states that Fulwood Booth farm was used to rear young cattle for the Lords of Hallamshire.

Keepers were appointed by the Lord of the Manor to protect the deer in Fulwood and Rivelin. The head keeper was known as "Master of the Game" and each keeper was paid a salary of £2 per year. In another document of that time the Canons of Beauchief Abbey were granted a grange at Fulwood in return for taking services in the Lord of the Manor's chapel. The monks of the grange were licensed to graze their cattle and goats and also carried out lead mining in the area of the present day Bole Hill farm. The grange became the property of Francis Talbot, 5th Earl of Shrewsbury upon the Dissolution of the Monasteries in the late 1530s.

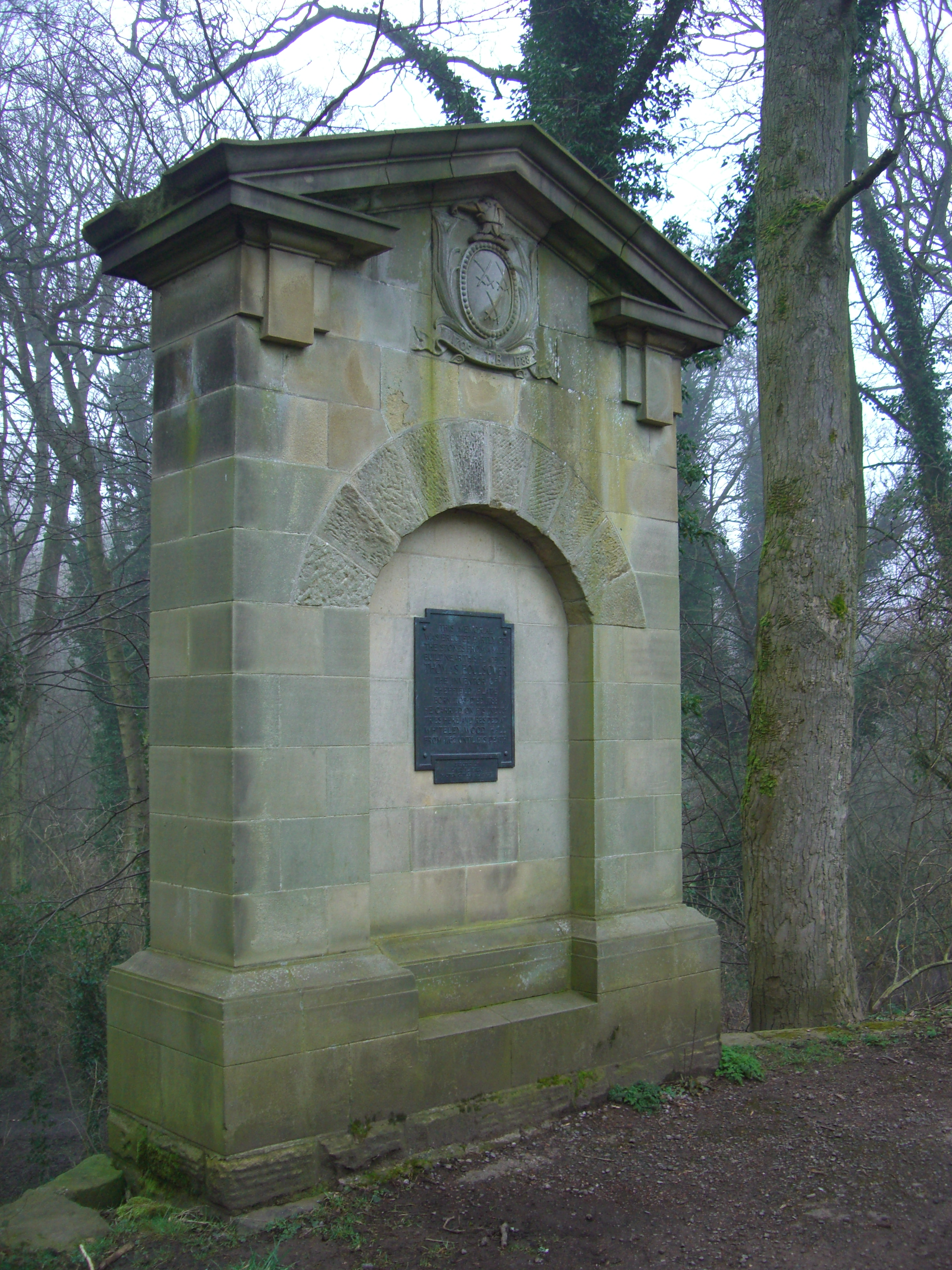
The Thomas Boulsover memorial at Wire Mill Dam

The Fox family built Fulwood Hall on the north side of the Mayfield valley, it was one of the first large houses in the area and is believed to date from the 15th century. Bennett Grange on Harrison Lane was built 400 metres to the west of Fulwood Hall in 1580, over the years it belonged to the Hall, Hind and Bennet families, it has been added to over the years and still stands today overlooking the Mayfield valley. Stumperlowe Hall was constructed in the 1650s by the Mitchell family who been landowners in the area since the 14th century, the hall was completely rebuilt in the 1850s. During the ravages of the Great Plague of 1666, Fulwood Spa became a popular resort for people alarmed by the spread of the disease. The spa was a spring of mineral water situated in the Porter valley near the present day Whitley Lane, it was created by Thomas Eaton who covered the spring with a building, many Sheffield people came to “take the waters”.

Industrial use of the rivers in the area started in 1641 when Ulysses Fox of Fulwood Hall built a corn mill on the Mayfield Brook just before its confluence with the Porter Brook. Thomas Boulsover, the inventor of Sheffield plate made further industrial use of the Porter in the Fulwood area in the 1760s when he constructed the Whiteley Wood rolling mill for the manufacture of saws and edge tools, Boulsover lived in the nearby Whiteley Wood Hall on the south bank of the Porter from 1757 till his death in 1788.

The Nonconformist Fulwood Old Chapel was constructed in 1729 for the use of Unitarians. The Church of England did not respond to the growth of Sheffield as an industrial town until the late 1830s when Fulwood parish was one of 25 new ecclesiastical districts created as the ancient parish of Sheffield was divided and Christ Church on present day Canterbury Avenue was opened in 1839 as the parish church. J. & C. Walker's map of Yorkshire of 1836 shows "Fullwood" as an isolated settlement well outside the town of Sheffield, however from the 1830s onward many of the more prosperous of the town's inhabitants moved further west to build villas on the south facing slopes of Fulwood, Ranmoor and Ecclesall. By the 1870s Fulwood was described in John Marius Wilson's "Imperial Gazetteer of England and Wales" as a village in a vale under Hallam moors, four miles wsw of Sheffield with a population of 1,801 and 368 houses. When Sheffield was made a City in 1893 Fulwood was still a tiny settlement and it was not until the 1920s and 1930s that large numbers of people were attracted to the area by cheap land and good transport links, prompting a large number of privately owned dwellings to be built.

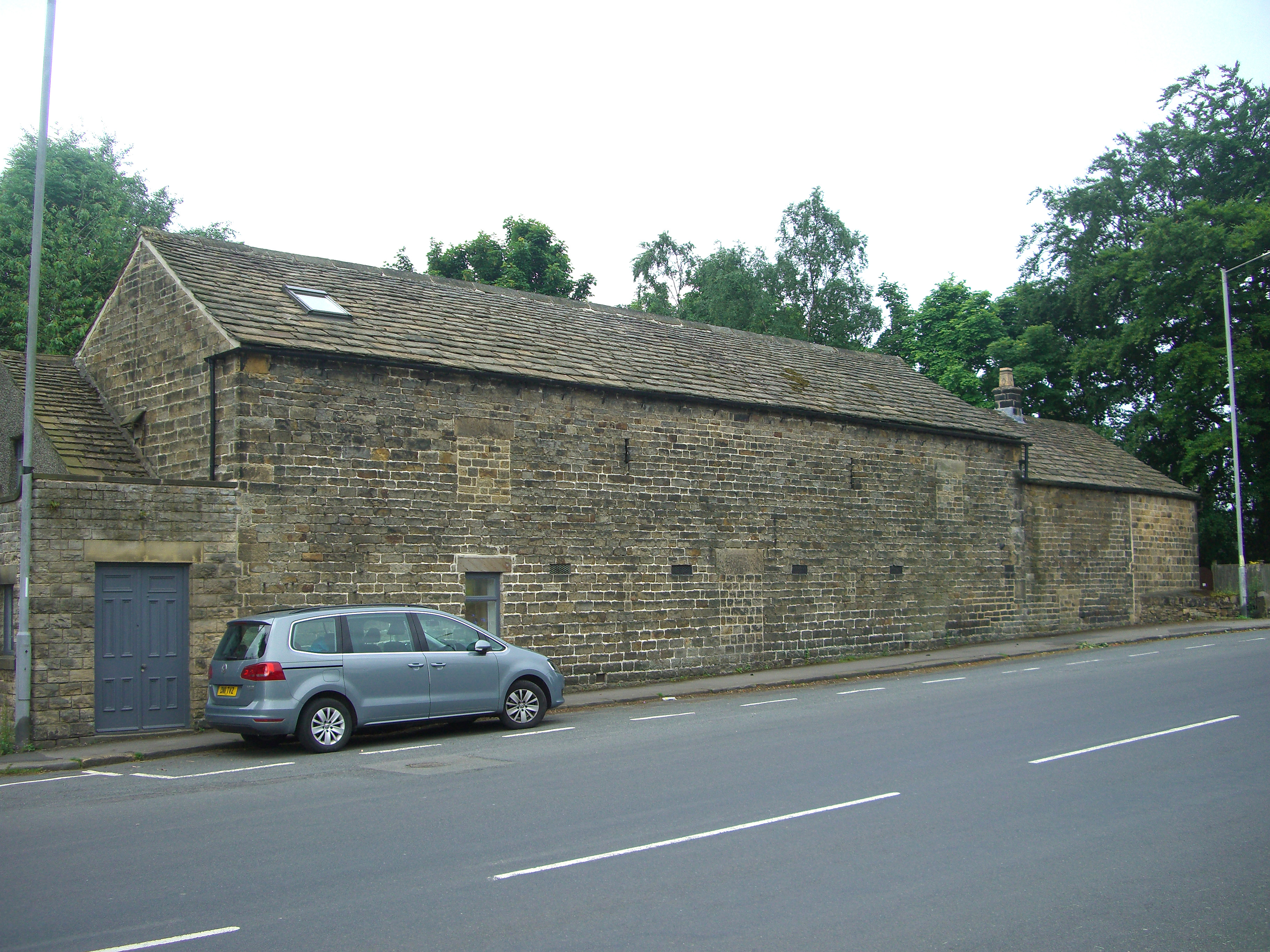
The Guildhall on Fulwood Road

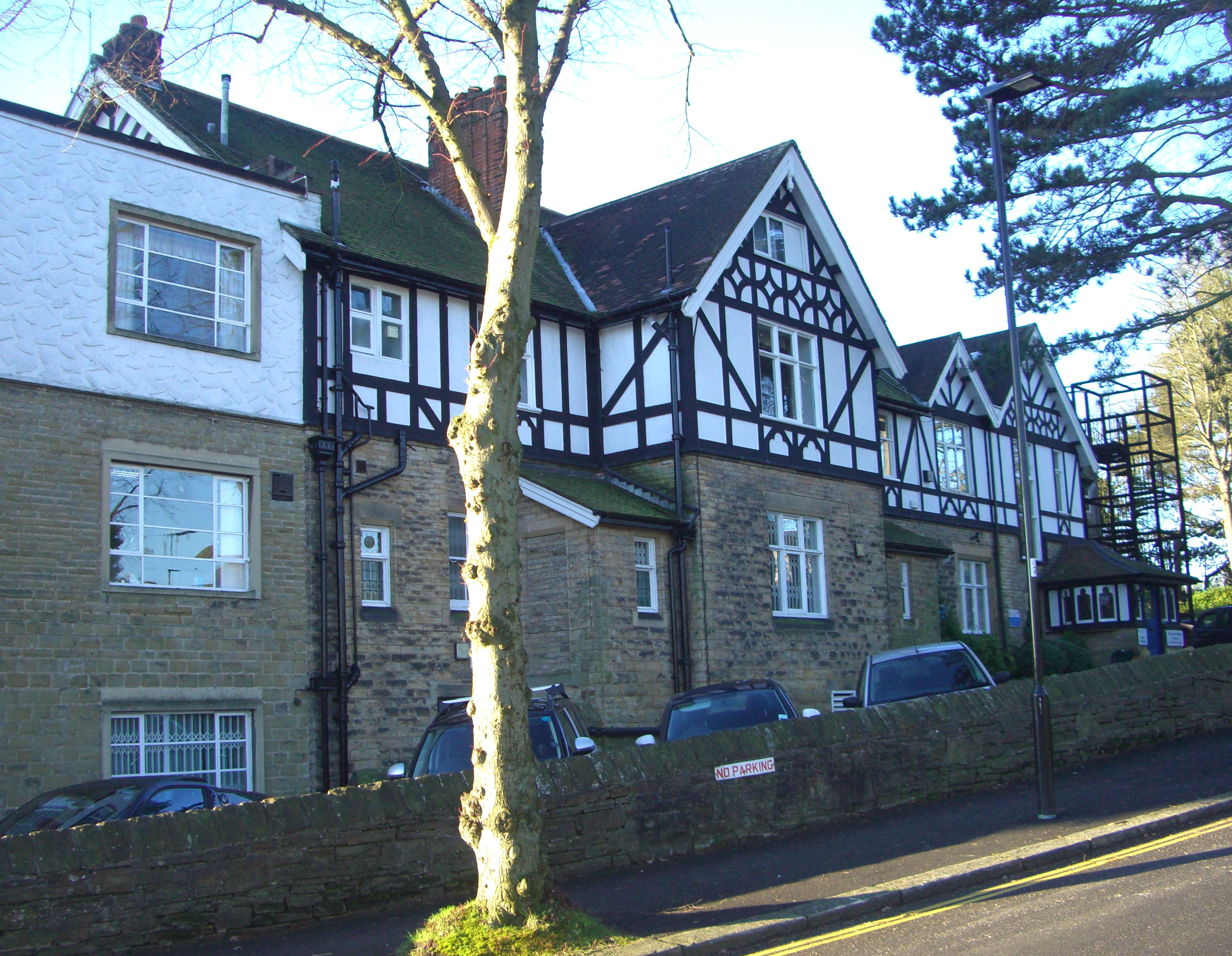
Fulwood House.

== Other significant buildings ==
Fulwood House on Old Fulwood Road is a large structure built in 1920 for the Wilsons, a well known local family involved in the manufacture of snuff. It was eventually purchased by the Sheffield Regional Hospital Board in 1948 and is now part of the headquarters of the Sheffield Health & Social Care NHS Foundation Trust, housing conference and training facilities and other meeting rooms. Two other adjacent buildings to Fulwood House are also part of the headquarters, these are the Vic Hallam Building and the 7 Storey Tower Block. The tower block is a significant landmark in the area and has caused some controversy as it is out of character with much of the architecture in the area.

The NHS stopped using the Fulwood House site in 2023, it has suffered from vandalism and fire damage since then. However planning permission was granted in July 2026 for 67 new houses to be built on the site. The plans include the restoration of Fulwood House with it being converted into six flats surrounded by 15 large houses. All other former NHS buildings on the site including the 7 storey tower block will be demolished.

The Guildhall on Fulwood Road dates from 1824, it is thought that it was formerly part of the outbuildings of Goole Green farm before becoming the parish church hall. It is now a private residence. Stumperlowe Grange on Stumperlowe Hall Road is a large late 17th century house, which originally had 50 acres of land it was remodelled and extended in the 19th century by W.E. Laycock owner of Samuel Laycock and Sons, hair seating manufacturers, and Mayor of Sheffield in 1865. It has now been divided into two large private residences. Much of the Grange's land was sold off for house building in the first half of the 20th century.

Stumperlowe Cottage is a former farmer's cottage with adjoining cruck barn which is now one large single storey residence. It was restored in the 1980s after falling into a ruined state and threatened with demolition. The Old School House on School Green Lane dates from 1736, it has a stone plaque above the door listing the benefactors. It became a private house in 1840 after a new school was built behind the parish church. The old stocks date from the early 19th century, they stand in front of Fulwood chapel but were formerly on the village green. The Sheffield Royal Hospital had an annexe at Fulwood off Brookhouse Hill overlooking the Porter valley, built in 1907 it closed in 1986 and is now a private housing development known as Mayfield Heights, it is rated as a building of Townscape Merit. The modern Hallam Towers is another significant local landmark.

=== Fulwood conservation area ===
An area based on the old core of Fulwood village has been designated a conservation area, it also takes in the Porter Brook's wooded valley bottom. It includes many architecturally interesting buildings including ten listed buildings plus the war memorial, village stocks and the Thomas Boulsover monument. The former industrial sites of Forge Dam and Wire Mill Dam are also included as are the local nature reserve at Whiteley Woods.

== Modern amenities ==
The main areas of recreation in Fulwood are the linear parks along the valley of the Porter Brook. Whiteley Woods park covers an area of 11.5 hectares while Forge Dam is a rectangular green space with an area of 9.5 hectares and has a café and children's playground. Both parks are part of the Porter Valley Parks, a string of interconnected green areas along the valley which features a 4.5 km long footpath starting at Endcliffe Park and finishing at Porter Clough in open countryside beyond Fulwood.

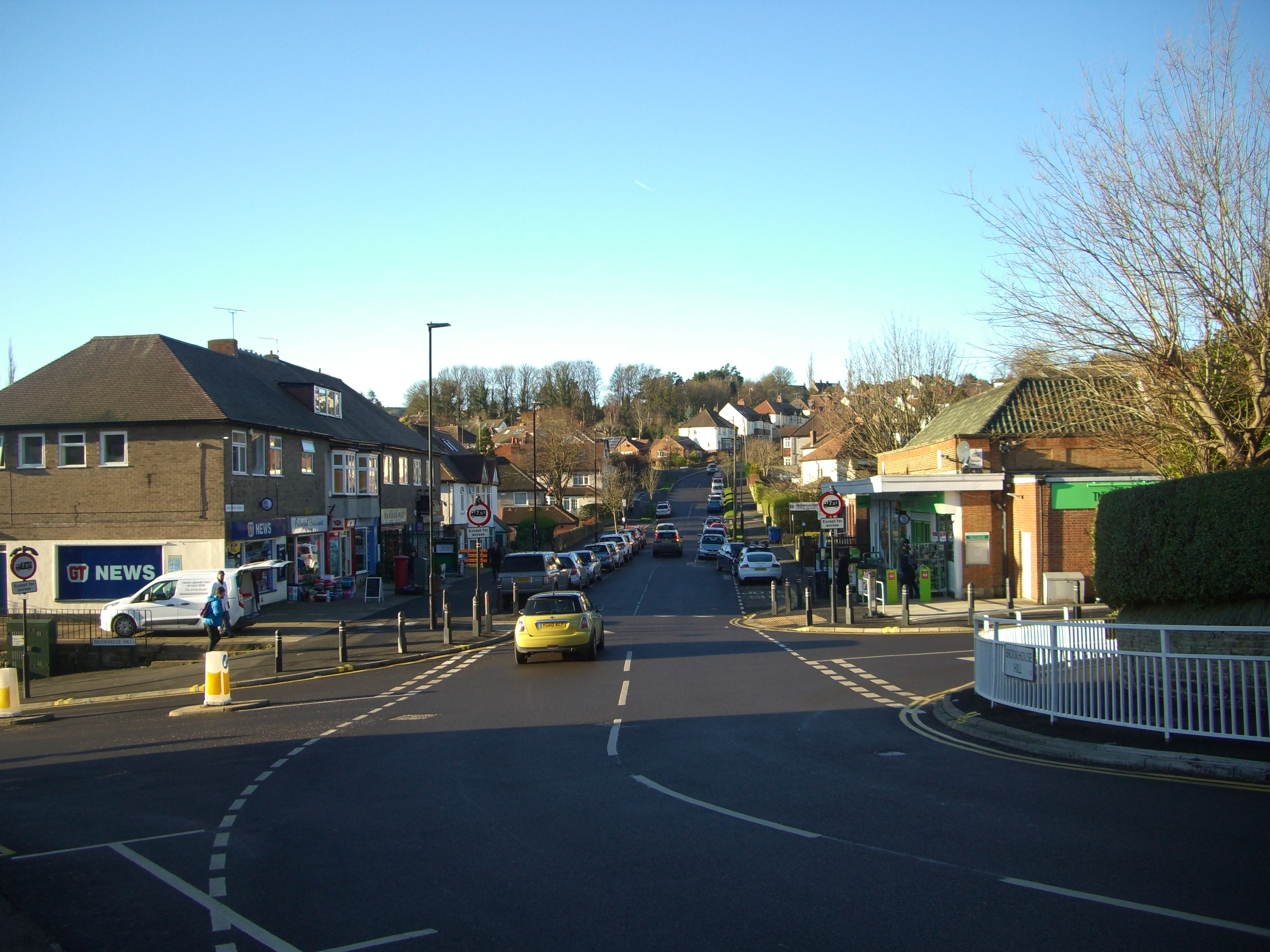
The small shopping area on Brooklands Avenue.

There is an area of shops on Brooklands Avenue near its junction with Crimicar Lane and also a nearby retail area on Fulwood Road at Nether Green. The nearest secondary schools are located just outside the suburb at Notre Dame, High Storrs and Tapton. Fulwood is connected to Sheffield city centre by the 120 bus operated by First South Yorkshire, which runs every 10 minutes on weekdays with a slightly reduced service at weekends, the journey takes approximately 35 minutes.

The Sheffield Neighbourhood Health and Well Being Profile for 2012 gave Fulwood a population of 6,447 and stated that it is one of the least deprived neighbourhoods in Sheffield. This is backed up by a 2011 report "Deprivation in Sheffield" by the University of Sheffield which states "Ecclesall is the least deprived neighbourhood in Sheffield, followed by Fulwood, Bents Green, Crosspool, Whirlow, Abbeydale and Millhouses – all of which are within the 10% least deprived locations in England". It also states that crime is significantly low in Fulwood and educational attainment and attendance is significantly better than average.
