= Ranmoor =

Suburb of Sheffield in South Yorkshire, England

Coordinates: 53.372°N 1.525°W

- Suburb
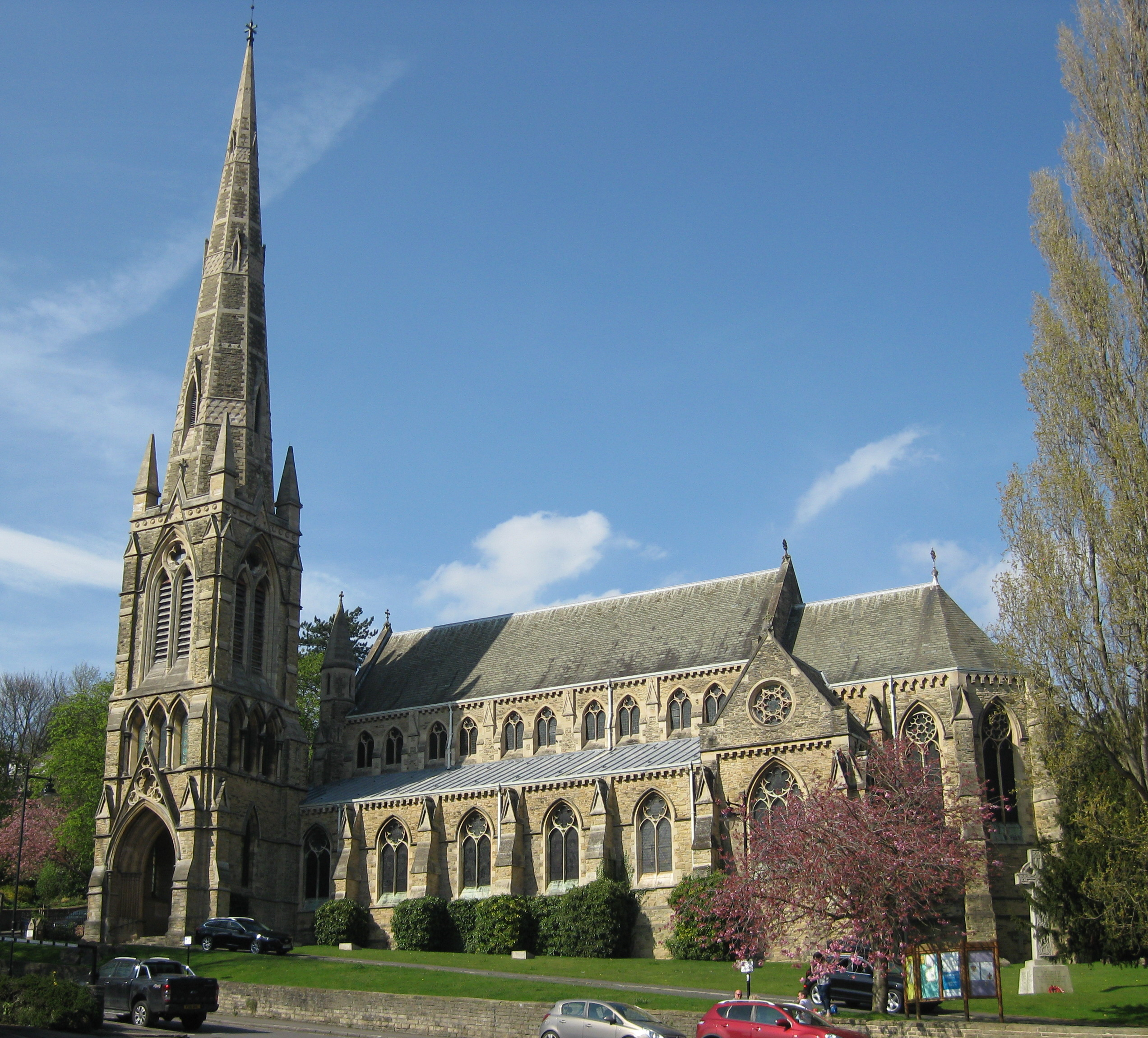
- St John's church

- Location within South Yorkshire
- OS grid reference: SK317862
- Metropolitan borough: Sheffield
- Metropolitan county: South Yorkshire
- Region: Yorkshire and the Humber
- Country: England
- Sovereign state: United Kingdom
- Post town: SHEFFIELD
- Postcode district: S10
- Dialling code: 0114
- Police: South Yorkshire
- Fire: South Yorkshire
- Ambulance: Yorkshire
- UK Parliament: Sheffield Hallam

Ranmoor (grid reference SK317862) is a suburb of the City of Sheffield, England. It is a suburb in the Fulwood ward of the city. It mostly developed in the late 19th and early 20th centuries, and it features a number of large houses that were built for the city's steel magnates, as well as, most notably, a large church, St John's. This church was opened 24 April 1879 but was almost entirely destroyed by fire on 2 January 1887. All that survived from the original church was the tower and spire, which still stands today. A new building was built and the church reopened on 9 September 1888; it is now a Grade II* listed building. A row of early 19th century buildings near the church includes the Bull's Head and Ranmoor Inn public houses.

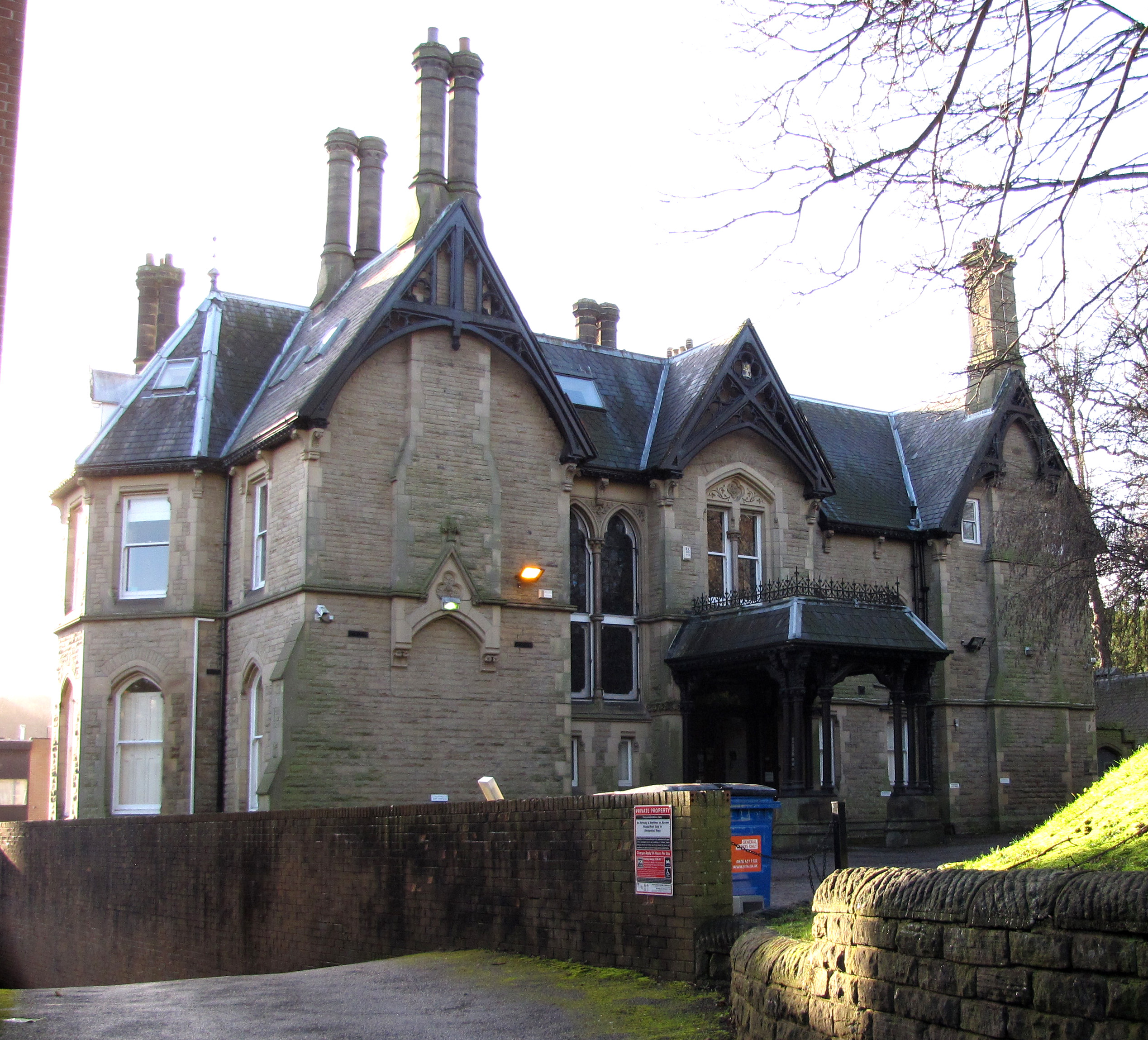
Riverdale House

Other notable buildings in the Ranmoor area were built for some of the well known industrialists of Sheffield. The Grade II listed Oakbrook was built by Flockton, Lee & Flockton c.1855 for Mark Firth, a steel magnate and philanthropist who founded Firth College, one of the institutions that eventually merged to establish the University of Sheffield. Oakbrook is now part of the Notre Dame Roman Catholic School. Ranmoor Hall was built in 1881 for William Wheatcroft Harrison, a cutlery manufacturer. The Croft was built in 1909 for James Neill, the tool manufacturer. The Grade II* Endcliffe Hall was completed in 1865; it was built for Sir John Brown by Flockton & Abbott. Thornbury was built in 1865 for Frederick Mappin, it is now a private hospital. The Grade II listed Riverdale House on Graham Road was built around 1860 and was lived in by the industrialist Charles Henry Firth and the businessman John George Graves.

== Notable people ==
- Actor and comedian Michael Palin was born in Ranmoor in 1943.
