= Riverdale House =

House in Sheffield, South Yorkshire, England

Coordinates: 53.369584°N 1.52033°W

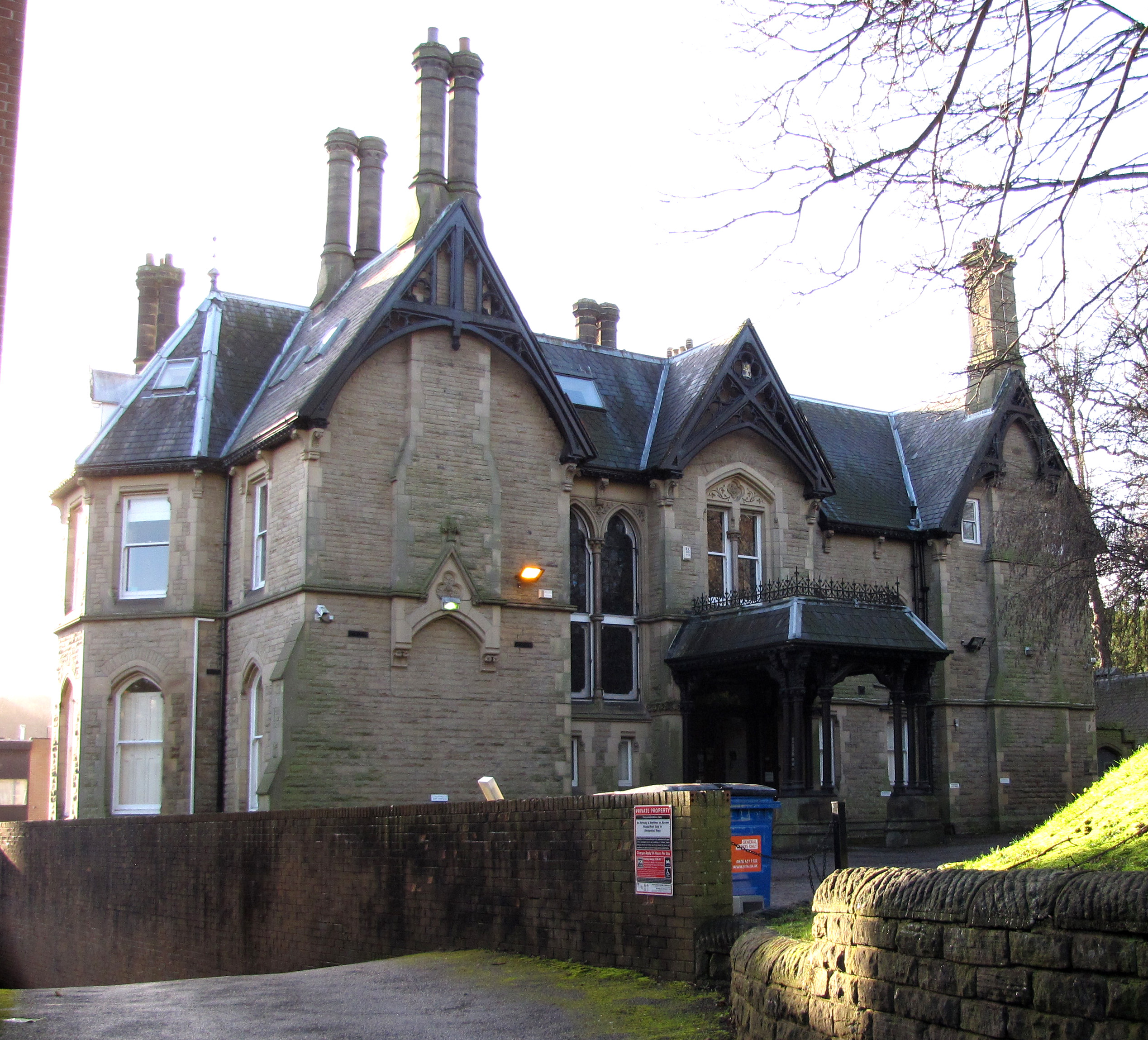
The main house seen from Graham Road.

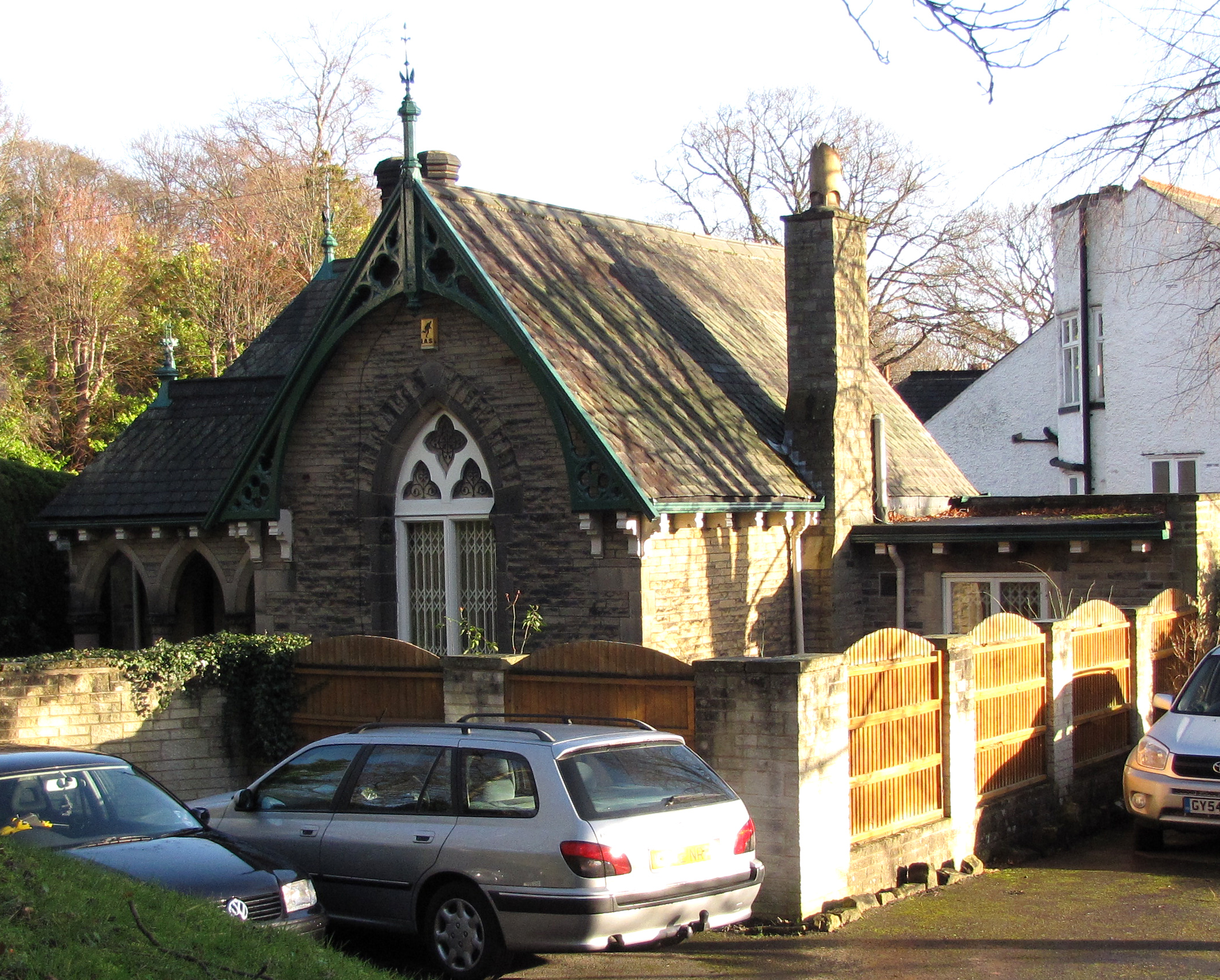
The lodge.

Riverdale House is a Victorian mansion located at 89 Graham Road in the Ranmoor area of Sheffield, England. Formerly a private residence, the building, which is Grade II Listed has now been adopted for commercial use and accommodates several small businesses.

== History ==
The house was built around 1860 for Charles Henry Firth (1837-1892) of the eminent Sheffield family of steel makers. Charles was the fifth son of Thomas Firth and the brother of Mark Firth. The house was constructed in the Victorian Gothic style and faced south taking in views of the Porter valley and Whiteley Woods. Firth lived at Riverdale house after his marriage to his wife Adelaide in 1860, who died at a young age in 1875. Firth himself died in December 1892 in Bath after suffering from gout for some time. Marianne Firth (Charles second wife) remained at Riverdale House for several years, along with her children and second husband.

Riverdale House was put up for sale in June 1898 and was described as “a substantially stone built family mansion, having upwards of 13 acres of valuable freehold land (exclusive roads) surrounded by excellent boundary walls and belted with well grown plantations”. The house eventually became the property of John George Graves (1866-1945) who, in 1902, moved in. The 36-year-old Graves was a successful and wealthy businessman who had set up one of the first mail order catalogues selling furniture, electro-plated goods, tools, drapery and clothes, he also became known as a generous benefactor to the City of Sheffield. At its height Graves’ company employed 3,000 people and he and his wife Lucy held an annual tea party for staff in Riverdale House's large grounds (photograph on Picture Sheffield).

Despite his success as a businessman, Graves did have financial difficulties in 1908 and was forced to lease Riverdale to a tenant and live in a smaller house in Beauchief, however by 1915 he had returned to the house and lived there for the rest of his life. After J.G. Graves’ death in 1945 Riverdale House was lived in by his daughter Ruth and her husband Stanley Drummond-Jackson. Around 1955 it was taken over by Brown Bayley Steels and used as offices. Today the house is still used as offices but is divided up between a number of small businesses. The substantial grounds were built on in the mid 1970s to accommodate the Riverdale Park apartment complex and the house is now hemmed in by modern buildings.

== Architecture ==
The house has been described as “Sumptuous Gothic” and is built from rock faced stone with ashlar dressings and gabled and hipped slate roofs. There is extensive use of lancet and sash windows with two storey bays at the front. The house has a fine entrance lodge at the corner of Graham Road and Riverdale Road, it is built in the same style as the main house and includes a hipped porch. It is also Grade II listed and is now used as offices.
