= Fulwood Old Chapel =

Church in Sheffield, England

Coordinates: 53.3622°N 1.5466°W

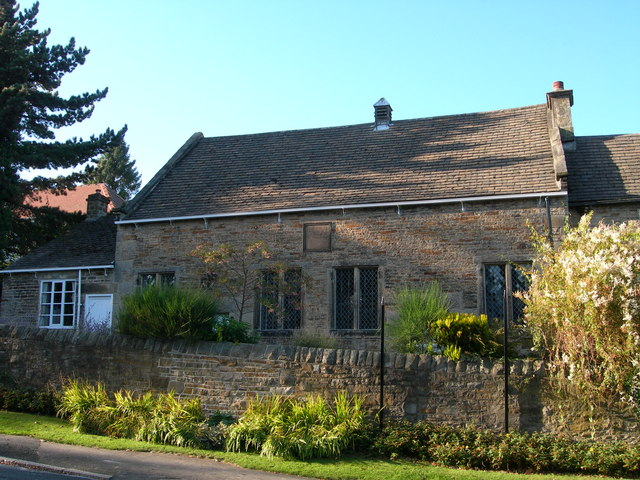

- Location within Sheffield

Religion
- Affiliation: Unitarian

Location
- Location: Fulwood, South Yorkshire, England
- Interactive map of Fulwood Old Chapel

Architecture
- Type: Chapel
- Completed: 1729
- Construction cost: £75
- Materials: Stone

Website
- https://fulwoodoldchapel.uk

Fulwood Old Chapel is a Unitarian place of worship in the Fulwood district of western Sheffield, South Yorkshire. It is a member of the General Assembly of Unitarian and Free Christian Churches, the umbrella organisation for British Unitarians.

The chapel was built from 1728 to 1729 as a meeting house for English Dissenters, who had previously met under John Fox at Fullwood Hall. William Ronksley left £400 in his will for the construction of a "large and handsome" chapel, although the construction itself cost only £75. The chapel is the second-oldest religious building in south or west Sheffield, after Beauchief Abbey.

The single-storey building is constructed of coursed stone and dressed with ashlar, and has stone slate roofs. The walls are around two feet thick. The street frontage has four mullioned windows, doors being placed between the first and second, and third and fourth, windows. A tablet above the two central windows reads "Built 1729 in pursuance of the last Will of Mr W Roncksley".

In 1754, a school room was added; this was extended in 1968 to include a kitchen and toilets, and was again modernised in 2009. It is currently used for a Sunday school and social events. Other changes were made in 1959, when a small storm porch was added inside the main entrance.

The chapel is now Grade II listed. A garden formerly laid outside the chapel, but this was removed in 1929, when the road was widened. At the same time, the early nineteenth century village stocks were then moved to lie in front of the building, and these are now also Grade II listed.

Samuel Plimsoll is believed to have worshipped at the chapel in the 1860s, and his first daughter may be buried under its floor.
