= Fulwood Hall =

Country House in Sheffield

Coordinates: 53.363714°N 1.559635°W

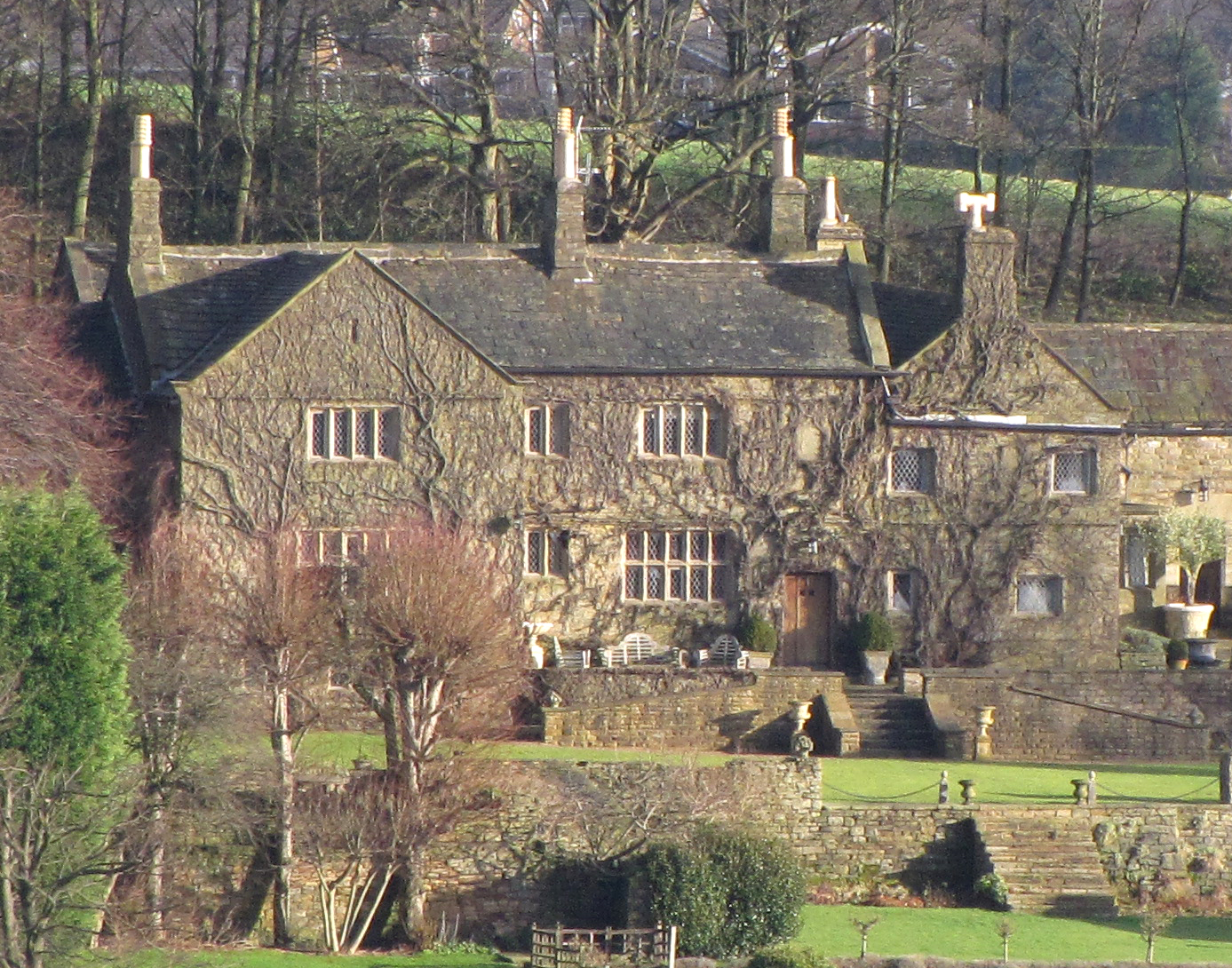
Seen across the Mayfield Valley from the SW.

Fulwood Hall, (archaic: Fullwood Hall) is an English country house situated on Harrison Lane in the suburb of Fulwood in Sheffield, England. It is a Grade II listed building. The hall stands in a lofty position on the north side of the Mayfield Valley at a height of 270 metres (885 feet). The hall is referred to as Fullwood Hall on old maps and the gate to the hall uses this spelling with two Ls.

== History ==
A hall existed on the site in the late 15th century, as it was mentioned in deed from the reign of Henry VII (1485 to 1509). The owners at that time were the Fox family who held considerable possessions throughout the township of Upper Hallam and Bradfield. Ulysses Fox, a yeoman farmer was the proprietor of the hall in the early 16th century along with his wife Elizabeth of Smallfield at Low Bradfield, they had a son William Fox who was baptised in Sheffield in December 1613. The hall was considerably altered in 1620 by Ulysses Fox, it has a date stone of 1620 and the exterior design is mainly of the 17th century. The Fox family continued to live at the hall until 1707 when George Fox is said to have squandered the estate by extravagant living and the hall was mortgaged to Nicholas Sylvester of Chapeltown.

After 1707 the hall passed into the ownership of John Fox who does not appear to be connected with the previous Fox family in any way. Fox, a gentleman of Sheffield Park was a religious Dissenter, in 1714 he was granted a licence which allowed Fulwood Hall to be used as a Dissenters’ place of worship until the building of Fulwood Old Chapel in 1729 . John Fox was a generous man, he gave money to the Hollis’s hospital as well as for the setting up of a free school for 18 poor children from Fulwood and Hallam. The hall came into the possession of the Greaves family in the early part of the 19th century when it was purchased by George Bustard Greaves. The Greaves were a well established Hallamshire family and lived there for many years. In 1942 the hall was purchased by Morgan Fairest owner of the machinery manufacturers Morgan Fairest Ltd on Carlisle Street. In more recent times the hall has had a swimming pool and tennis court added in the grounds.

== Architecture ==
The hall is typical architecturally of many large yeoman farmers houses in South Yorkshire with well proportioned mullioned windows with diamond-shaped leaded lights. The hall faces south-west away from the road and takes in the extensive view across the Mayfield valley towards the Peak District. It is built in the shape of a letter L from course squared locally quarried stone with ashlars dressings. The 1620 datestone is above the front door, the outbuildings run at a right angle to the main house and include a carriage house. The interior features two ground floor rooms with fielded panelling with a Tudor arched stone doorway and a stone fireplace with moulded lintel.
