= St John's Church, Ranmoor =

Church in Sheffield, England

Coordinates: 53.3724°N 1.5211°W

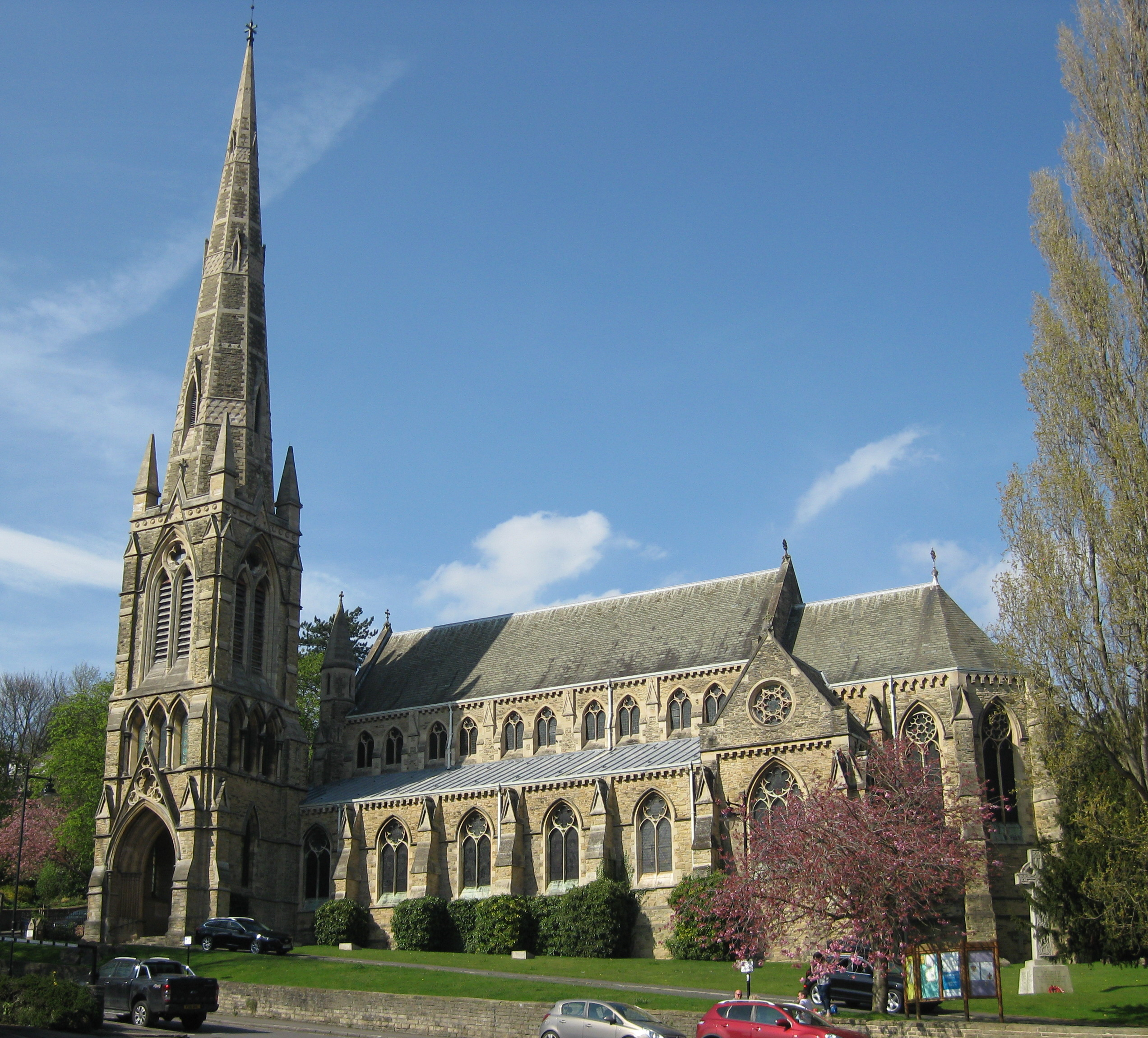
- St John's Church, Ranmoor
- OS grid reference: SK 31952 86280
- Denomination: Church of England
- Churchmanship: Broad Church
- Website: www.stjohnsranmoor.org.uk

History
- Dedication: St. John the Evangelist

Administration
- Province: York
- Diocese: Sheffield
- Deanery: Hallam

Clergy
- Vicar: Revd Canon Dr Matthew Rhodes

St John's Church, Ranmoor is a large parish church in Ranmoor, a suburb of the City of Sheffield, England. It is a Church of England church in the Diocese of Sheffield, and it is the second church to be built on this site after the original church was destroyed by fire in 1887. It has a 190-foot-tall (58 m) tower and spire, the second tallest church spire in Sheffield after the Cathedral Church of St Marie which is just 5 ft taller.

== History ==
The original church built on this site was designed by E. M. Gibbs, and was opened on 24 April 1879. The building was almost entirely destroyed by fire on 2 January 1887; all that survived was the 190-foot-tall (58 m) tower and spire. A new church, designed by Flockton & Gibbs (the same Edward Mitchel Gibbs), was built that incorporated the old tower and spire. The church reopened on 9 September 1888; it is a Grade II* listed building.

== Memorials ==
The War Memorial in the churchyard consists of a 16 ft Runic Cross made from unpolished Cornish granite, with carved panels on front and back designed by Mr. A.F. Watson, Sheffield.

== Organ ==
The organ was installed in 1888 by Sheffield builder Brindley and Foster. It is a large three-manual instrument, generally considered to be one of the finest pipe organs in the area. In 2020, the organ underwent an extensive overhaul to repair damage caused by a partial collapse of the ceiling in October 2017. The full specification of the pipe organ can be found at the National Pipe Organ Register.

== Notable people ==
Monty Python actor Michael Palin listed St John's as one of his 'top seven' favourite Churches in a speech to the National Churches Trust on account of it being the Church he was baptised in and regularly attended as a child. He describes fond memories of his Father being both a chorister and bellringer there.
