= Stumperlowe Hall =

Country house in Sheffield, South Yorkshire, England

Coordinates: 53.367471°N 1.539017°W

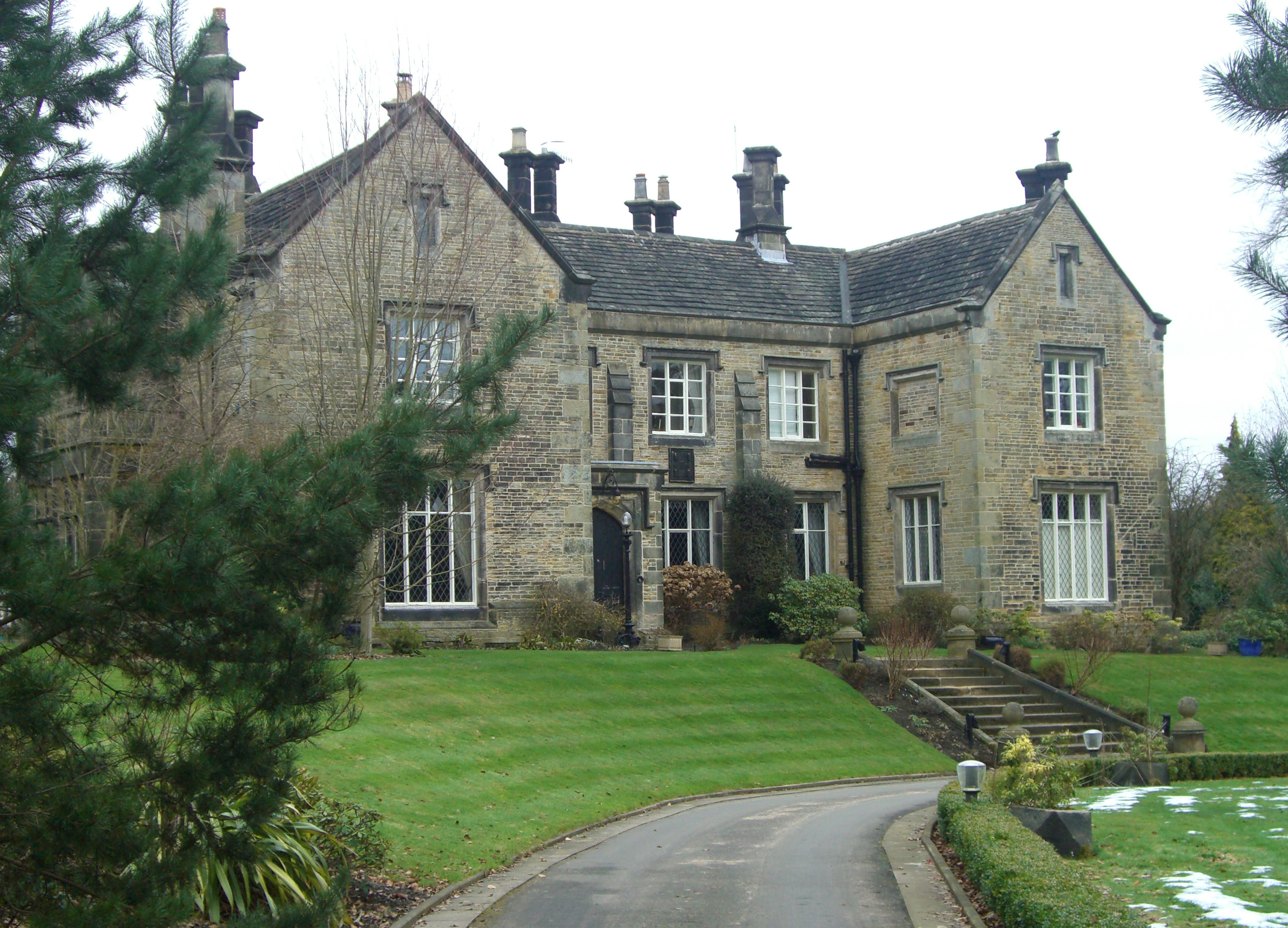

Stumperlowe Hall is an English Manor House situated in the city of Sheffield, England. It is located on Stumperlowe Hall Road, in the suburb of Fulwood. The hall is a Grade II listed building.

== History ==
The present-day house dates from 1854, a previous hall was built on the same site in the 1650s by Robert Hall, a descendant of the Mitchells, an ancient Hallamshire family who had held land in the Stumperlowe area since the end of the 14th century. Robert Hall and his wife Dorothy lived at Stumperlowe Hall for over fifty years, the couple had a son Henry Hall who also resided at the hall for a time. By 1716 the grandchildren of Robert Hall had to surrender the house by order of the Sheffield Manor Court and it was purchased by Daniel Gascoigne of Sheffield, an apothecary and John Hawksworth, a lead merchant. The hall was the residence and estate of Mr. Hawksworth and his family for most of the remaining years of the 18th century.

The hall was completely transformed in 1854 when it came into the possession of Henry Isaac Dixon (1820-1912) of Page Hall. Dixon was part owner of the Britannia metal manufacturing company James Dixon & Sons of Cornish Place. Dixon rebuilt and extended the hall in a subtle and sensitive style, introducing more light into the house by replacing the original mullioned windows with larger areas of glass. Dixon was also a generous patron of the Fulwood area providing money for tree planting and for the expansion of Christ Church on Canterbury Avenue. Henry Isaac Dixon died in 1912 and his son James Dixon (1851-1947) moved into the hall, James Dixon had taken over the running of the family firm in 1877 and was elected as one of the youngest ever Master Cutlers in 1887 at the age of 36. He moved out of Stumperlowe Hall in 1924, at the age of 73, although he lived until he was 96 years old.

After the Dixons, the hall was home for several families. In 1957 the hall was purchased by Lady Kenning, widow of Sir George Kenning, who had made a fortune by car sales and distribution through his firm now known as the GK Group. Lady Kenning died in 1974 and the hall has remained a family home since. The hall was for sale in September 2015 at a price of £2.25 million.

== Architecture ==
The hall is constructed in the Tudor Revival style from coursed squared stone with ashlars dressing with a stone slate roof. The windows are mainly wood mullioned casements with label moulds. There is a small square porch with Tudor arch at the front door. The western side has a square two storey stone bay window. The interior features a 40 foot long reception hall with vaulted ceiling, the reception lounge has a ceiling which extends to the full height of the building, the dining room is oak panelled. The 2.5 acre grounds include a three bedroom lodge.
