= The Mount, Sheffield =

The Mount
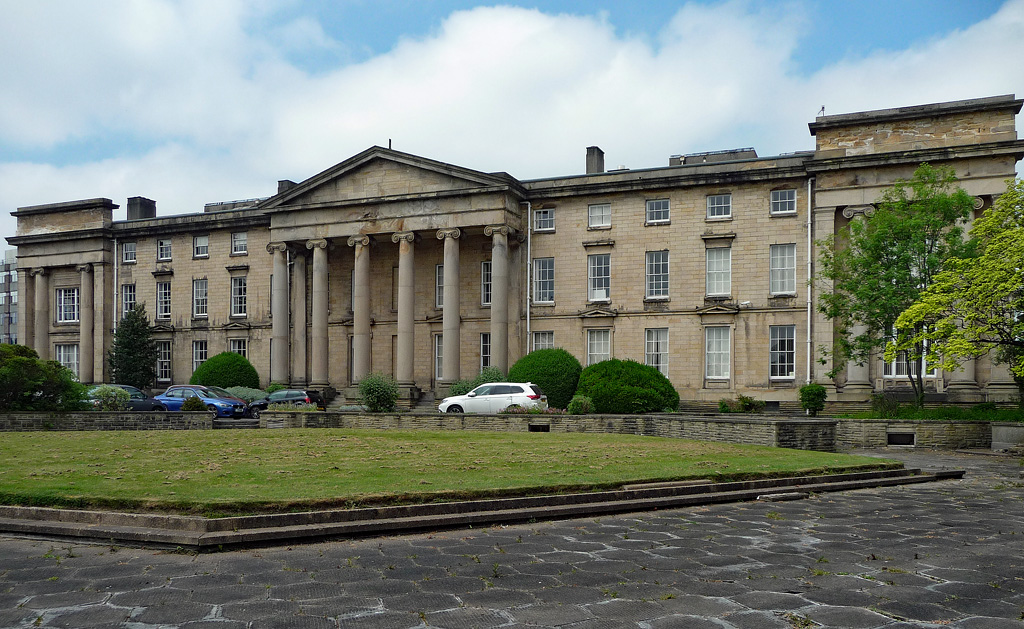

General information
- Type: Terraced houses (now offices)
- Architectural style: neoclassical
- Location: Glossop Road, Broomhill, Sheffield, England
- Coordinates: 53.3768°N 1.4989°W (grid reference SK3386)
- Construction started: 1830
- Completed: 1832
- Owner: Aviva

Design and construction
- Architect: William Flockton
- Designations: Grade II* listed

The Mount is a Grade II* listed building situated on Glossop Road in the Broomhill area of Sheffield in England. It stands just over 1.3 miles (2.1 km) west of the city centre. It is a neoclassical building which was originally a terrace of eight houses but since the 1950s has been used for commercial office space for various businesses. The building is part of the Broomhill Conservation Area, which was set up in March 1977 through an agreement with local residents and Sheffield City Council.

== History ==
The Mount was built by the local architect William Flockton in 1830–1832. At the time of its construction it stood in a rural situation and was nicknamed "Flockton's Folly" because it was thought to be too far out of town to attract potential buyers. Flockton was in fact emulating the trend set by Bath’s Royal Crescent and London’s Regent's Park in constructing a building that looked like a country mansion but in fact contained several separate dwellings. The Mount consisted of eight apartments, described as "genteel dwellings", they were numbered 2 to 16 from the Newbold Lane end towards Glossop Road.

Flockton had no doubt about the quality of The Mount and its location, calling it, "a handsome Ionic edifice ... substantially built and in design and taste far exceeding any of the present erections in the neighbourhood of Sheffield". The Mount with its south-facing views over the Porter valley, became a fashionable location to live, attracting some of the upper echelon of Sheffield society. The success of The Mount greatly enhanced Flockton's reputation as an architect and he used the design of the house as a basis for his better known and grander Wesley College which he built nearby on Glossop Road in 1838.

=== Occupants ===
The most famous resident was the editor and poet James Montgomery who lived at number 4 from 1835 until his death in 1854. Other well known people who lived at The Mount included, Walton J. Hadfield, the City Surveyor who lived at number 2 from 1926 to 1934, James Wilkinson, the iron and steel merchant who lived at number 6 from 1837 to 1862 and George Wostenholm, the cutlery manufacturer, who lived at number 8 between 1837 and 1841. Numbers 14 and 16 were lived in by George Wilson, the snuff manufacturer between 1857 and 1867, one house was not big enough for his family.

The Mount was purchased by the Sheffield department store John Walsh Ltd. in the early years of the 20th century and flat numbers 10 to 16 were used as housing for their staff. The Mount was used as a temporary retail outlet when Walsh’s store on High Street was destroyed in the Sheffield Blitz of December 1940. By the end of 1941 Walsh's had moved back to the city centre, taking up short-term residences on Fargate and Church Street until a new permanent store was built after the war. In 1958 The Mount was purchased by the United Steel Companies for offices, being converted by the Sheffield architects Mansell Jenkinson Partnership who also installed lifts in the building. In 1967 it became the regional headquarters of British Steel Corporation. In 1978 the building was purchased by the insurance company Norwich Union.

In July 2009 the building was let out to A+ English, a Sheffield-based Language school who carried out an extensive refurbishment before opening for business in September 2009. The building has 1,385 square metres of floor space on three floors with an integrated basement car park. The Mount is owned by Aviva, the parent company of Norwich Union.

Currently, the building is left unused and abandoned. Much of the furniture and utilities have been left outside. No security appears to work to secure this building. This comes from @surbexuk on tiktok you guys can delete this when someone properly makes a paragraph for its abandonment

== Architecture ==
The Mount's most striking architectural feature is its portico with six Ionic columns. The building is 17 bays in width, most of which have 12-pane sash windows. The end pavilions each have paired Ionic columns .
