= Crosspool =

Suburb of Sheffield, South Yorkshire, England

Coordinates: 53.378°N 1.526°W

- Suburb
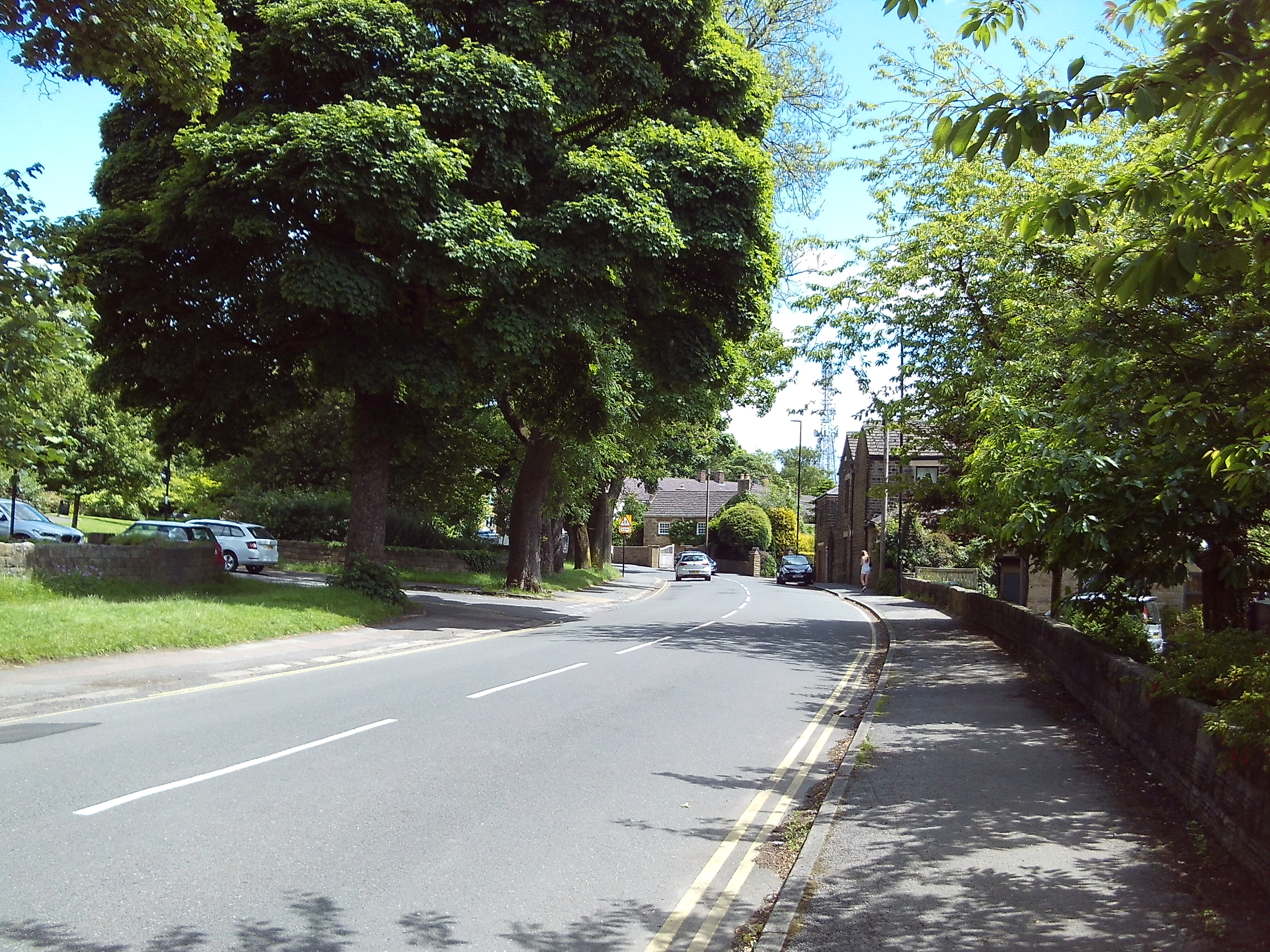
- Lydgate Lane

- Location within Sheffield
- Population: 7,070
- Metropolitan borough: City of Sheffield
- Metropolitan county: South Yorkshire
- Region: Yorkshire and the Humber
- Country: England
- Sovereign state: United Kingdom
- Post town: SHEFFIELD
- Postcode district: S10
- Dialling code: 0114
- Police: South Yorkshire
- Fire: South Yorkshire
- Ambulance: Yorkshire
- UK Parliament: Sheffield Hallam

Crosspool is a suburb of the City of Sheffield, South Yorkshire, England, located 2.5 miles (4 km) west of the city centre. The suburb falls within the Crookes ward of the City of Sheffield. It is a middle class residential area in an elevated position above the Porter and Rivelin valleys and stands at around 660 feet (200 m) above sea level. Crosspool is situated on the A57 road (Manchester Road) and is the last suburb on that road before the city boundary and open countryside is reached. In 2011 Crosspool had a population of 6,703.

== History ==
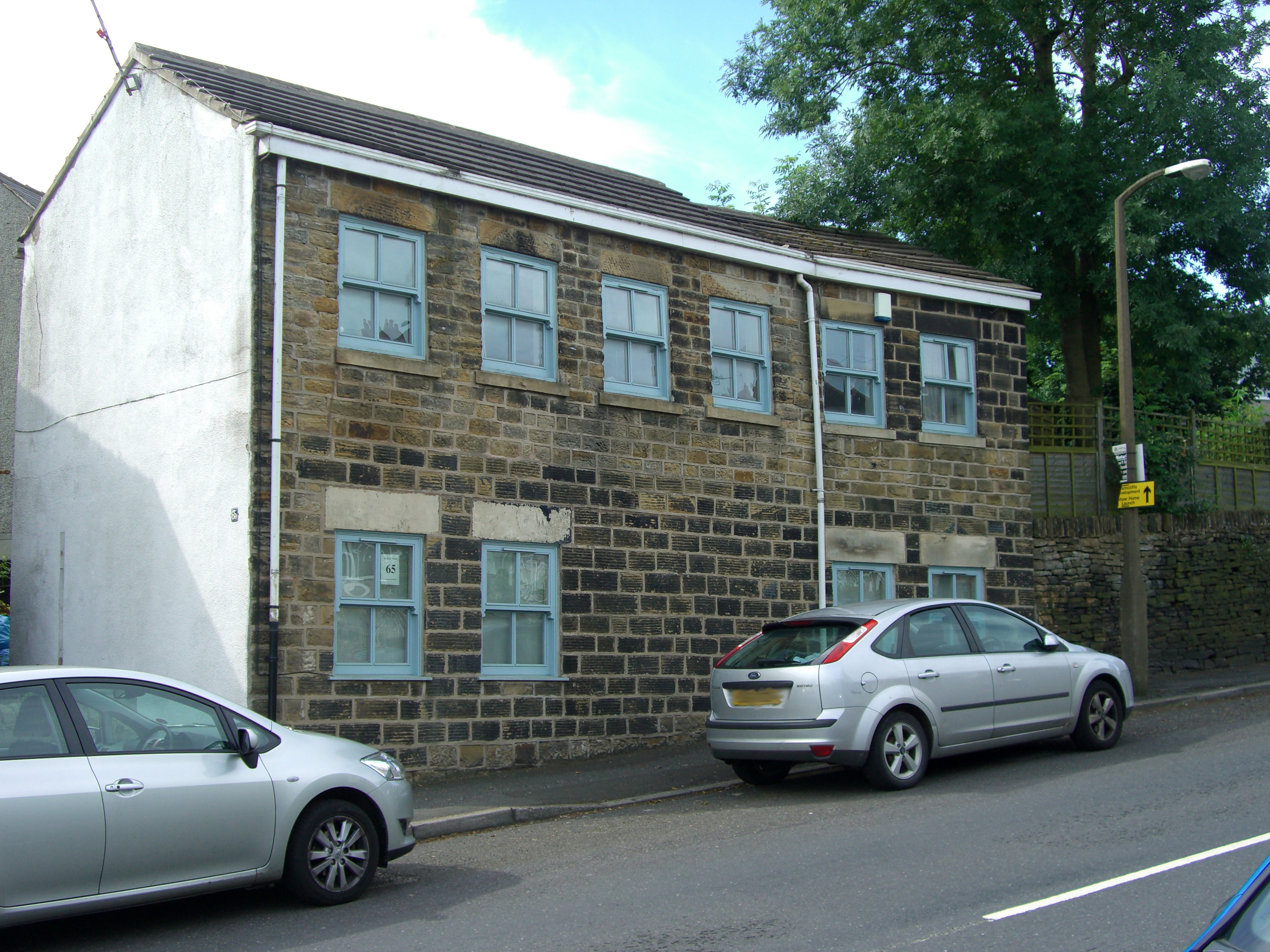
The oldest building in Crosspool. Situated at the junction of Sandygate Road and Ringstead Crescent, it was formerly a line of cottages and dates from the 1600s.

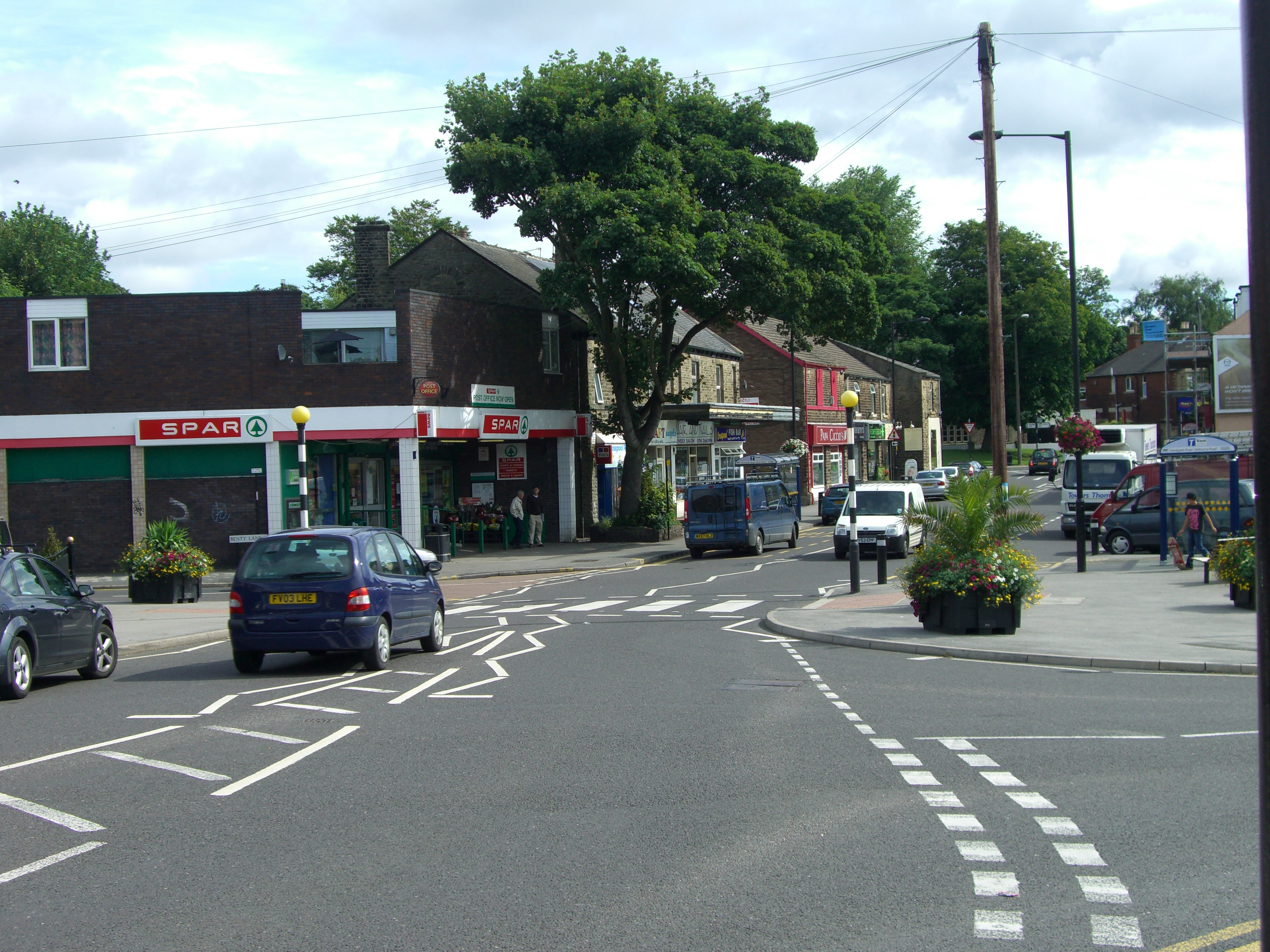
The shops at the junction of Sandygate Road and Manchester Road are regarded as the centre of Crosspool.

The area of Crosspool is a fairly recent creation and, unlike some Sheffield suburbs, does not have any ancient history as a village stretching back over the centuries. W. Fairbank's “Map of the Parish of Sheffield in the County of York” published in 1795 shows it as a thinly populated unnamed area sprinkled with a few buildings. From the early centuries AD the Long Causeway ancient track passed through the area; this originated in Roman times as a highway connecting the forts at Templeborough and Buxton and continued in later centuries as a packhorse route.

Throughout medieval times the area was part of a deer hunting park known as Hallamshire Chase. This was an area of thousands of acres set aside for the Lords of Hallamshire after the Norman conquest of England. Lydgate Hall was one of the earliest substantial buildings in the area as it existed in the early 1700s although it was substantially altered and extended in the early 19th century. It was the home of the steel magnate Horatio Bright (1827–1905) for the last 30 years of his life. The Hall was eventually demolished in the 1930s being replaced by housing on Lydgate Hall Crescent.

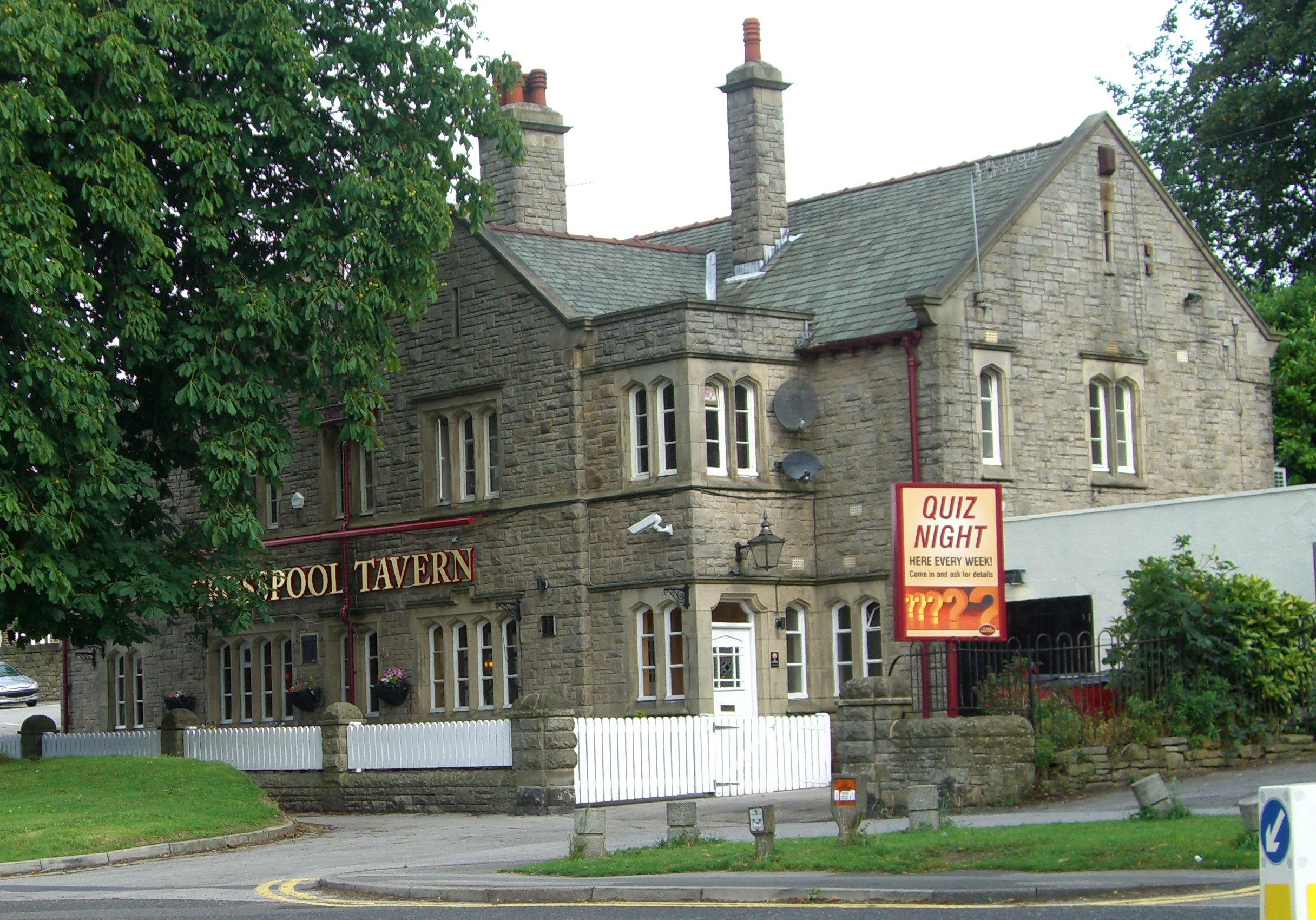
The Crosspool Tavern, a pub on Manchester Road since 1824, the original building was replaced by this structure in 1930.

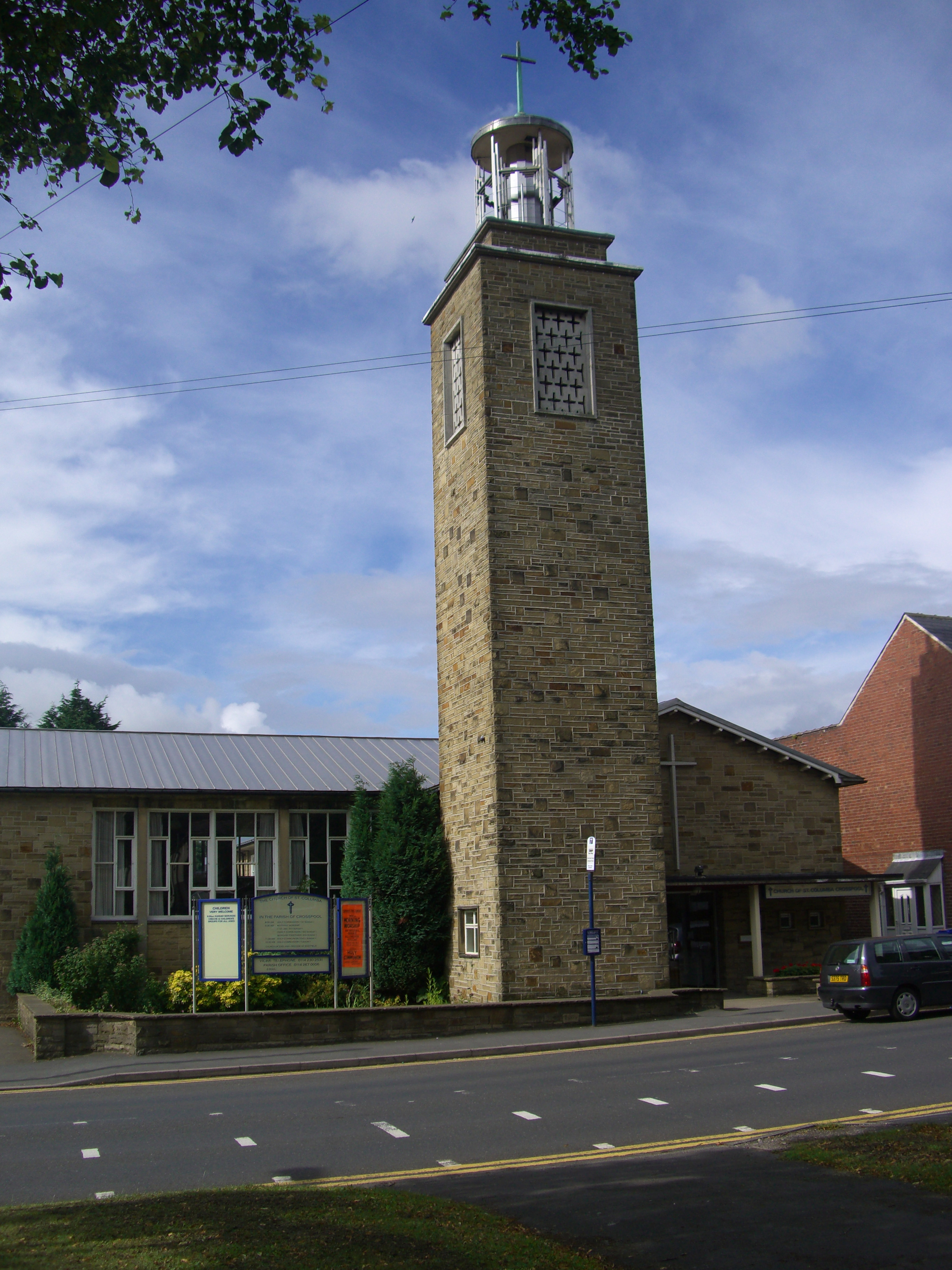
St. Columba church, Manchester Road dates from 1956.

Although there was never a Crosspool village, the area was strategically placed as two roads left Sheffield through the area and there was a toll gate as well as inns and a blacksmiths to serve the traveller. The main industry in the 18th and 19th century was farming although there was also extensive quarrying. The presence of several natural pools gave the area its name in the 1800s as travellers on the turnpike roads were said to have “crossed the pools” when they had passed through the neighbourhood and the name of Crosspool developed. The A57 road was built in 1820, and tolls were phased out in 1884, but housing development in the area was delayed because of Crosspool's elevated position, which developers thought would deter people from settling in the area.

Housing development eventually started in the 1880s but full-scale building did not take place until after the First World War. In 1913 Crosspool became the first area of Sheffield to receive a public transport service by bus as the Sheffield Tramway did not extend to the suburb. Crosspool suffered some bomb damage during the Second World War when bombs were dropped on Den Bank, Shore Lane, Sandygate Road and Ringstead Crescent.

== Demographics ==
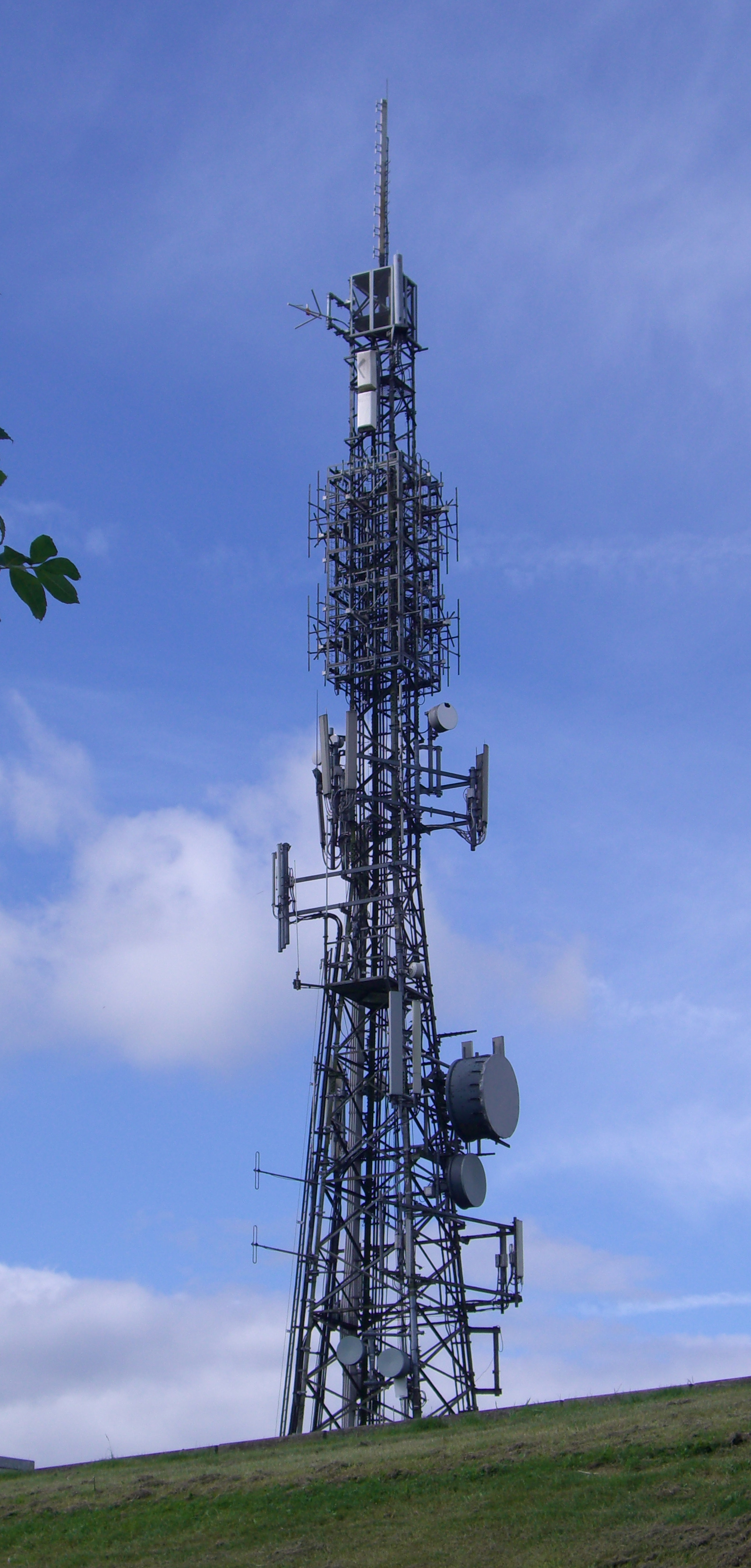
The Crosspool transmitter is a prominent landmark across Sheffield.

Crosspool is a suburb with vague boundaries; it merges with the adjacent neighbourhoods of Crookes, Fulwood and Ranmoor and has sub-districts within it such as Tapton Hill, Sandygate and Hallam Head. It has a total population of 7,070 residents in a 2006/7 NHS Neighbourhood Profile, just 1.3% of the population of the City of Sheffield. Other statistics bear out Crosspool's status as a middle class area with almost 87% of residents being owner-occupiers of their houses compared to the Sheffield average of 60.2%. Almost 80% of Crosspool's housing is either detached or semi-detached, again well above the average. 93.1% of Year 11 school pupils go on to further education compared to the Sheffield average of 86.8% while 38.5% of Crosspool's adults have been educated to degree level in contrast to the Sheffield average of 18.8%.

== Buildings and landmarks ==
Present day Crosspool is centred on the area around the junction of Manchester Road, Sandygate Road and Lydgate Lane (locally /ˈlɪdʒɪt/ Li-JIT) where there is a selection of shops, food takeaways and a post office which since 2004 has been located inside a SPAR store. The Crosspool Tavern, a public house, is also in this area. Other public houses in Crosspool are “The Sportsman” at Stephen Hill and “The Plough” at Sandygate. Another pub, the "Hallamshire Hotel" on Lydgate Lane was demolished in the summer of 2011 and has been replaced by four houses, two apartments and a detached garage block. There are four schools in Crosspool for different age groups. Tapton School on Darwin Lane has over 1600 pupils between 11 and 18 years old and is a specialist college for science and the arts. The Lower School of King Edward VII School is also located on Darwin Lane and was known as Crosspool Secondary Modern School until 1969. Lydgate Junior School is situated on Manchester Road and has around 480 pupils between the ages of 7 and 11. While Lydgate Infant School on Lydgate Lane has just over 300 pupils, it is housed in a Grade II listed building dating from 1896, built by William John Hale.

Tapton Hall, a Grade II listed building is situated on Shore Lane, it was built in 1855 and has been the home of the industrialist Edward Vickers and the snuff mill owner George Wilson; today it is a conference and banqueting centre which is licensed to conduct weddings. Another Grade II listed structure is The Towers, a Scottish Baronial fantasy on Sandygate Road.

The main churches in Crosspool are the Church of St. Columba and Stephen Hill Methodist Church, both of which are located on Manchester Road near the centre of the suburb. Because of the pressure from housing developers present day Crosspool has been left with very few open spaces for recreation with the small park/play area on the north side of Lydgate Lane being created on re-claimed land when an extensive quarry was filled in the first half of the 20th century. A prominent landmark, also on Lydgate Lane, is the Crosspool transmitter, officially known as the Tapton Hill transmitting station, which stands on the site of a covered reservoir and is well seen from many parts of Sheffield. The 57-metre-high mast takes advantage of Crosspool's elevated position to provide TV pictures and radio signals for Sheffield by the “line of sight” method. The privately run Claremont Hospital is situated at 401 Sandygate Road.

== Sport ==
Hallam F.C., the second oldest football club in the world has its home ground in Crosspool at Sandygate Road, which is the oldest football ground in the world. Crosspool hosts the start and finish of the Hallam Chase, a 3.25 miles (5.25 km) race starting at Hallam cricket ground, going on a very hilly route to Stannington church and then returning to the ground. The route has almost 250 metres of ascending and is run every year on Whit Tuesday. The race, which is organised by the local athletics club, the Hallamshire Harriers, started in 1863. Sebastian Coe, the Olympic Games gold medal winning middle distance runner, was brought up in Crosspool, attending Tapton School and being a member of Hallamshire Harriers.

== Community ==
Reports of open meeting minutes, together with items of local interest, letters and adverts are published in the quarterly 'Crosspool Clarion' magazine, delivered to over 2,500 local households, and also on the crosspool.info website. Many events and village activities are held in Crosspool. Every year since 2003 a summer fayre has been held in July, along with car boot sales in June and September. A Festival was first organised in 2010, going on to become an annual event.
