= Flockton (architects) =

British architectural family

Flockton's were a series of architectural firms in the 19th and early 20th centuries, based in Sheffield, England. The firms were responsible for a number of significant buildings, particularly in the Sheffield area.

== William Flockton ==
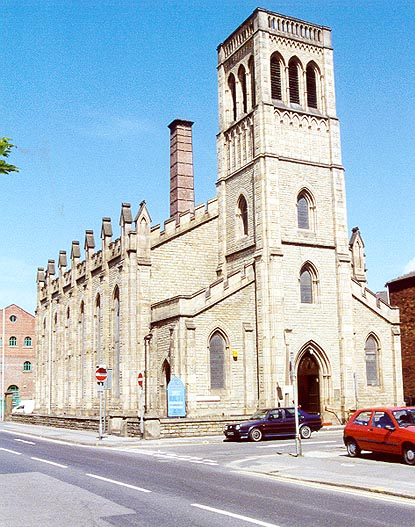
Holy Trinity Church, Nursery Street. By Flockton, Lee and Flockton; 1848.

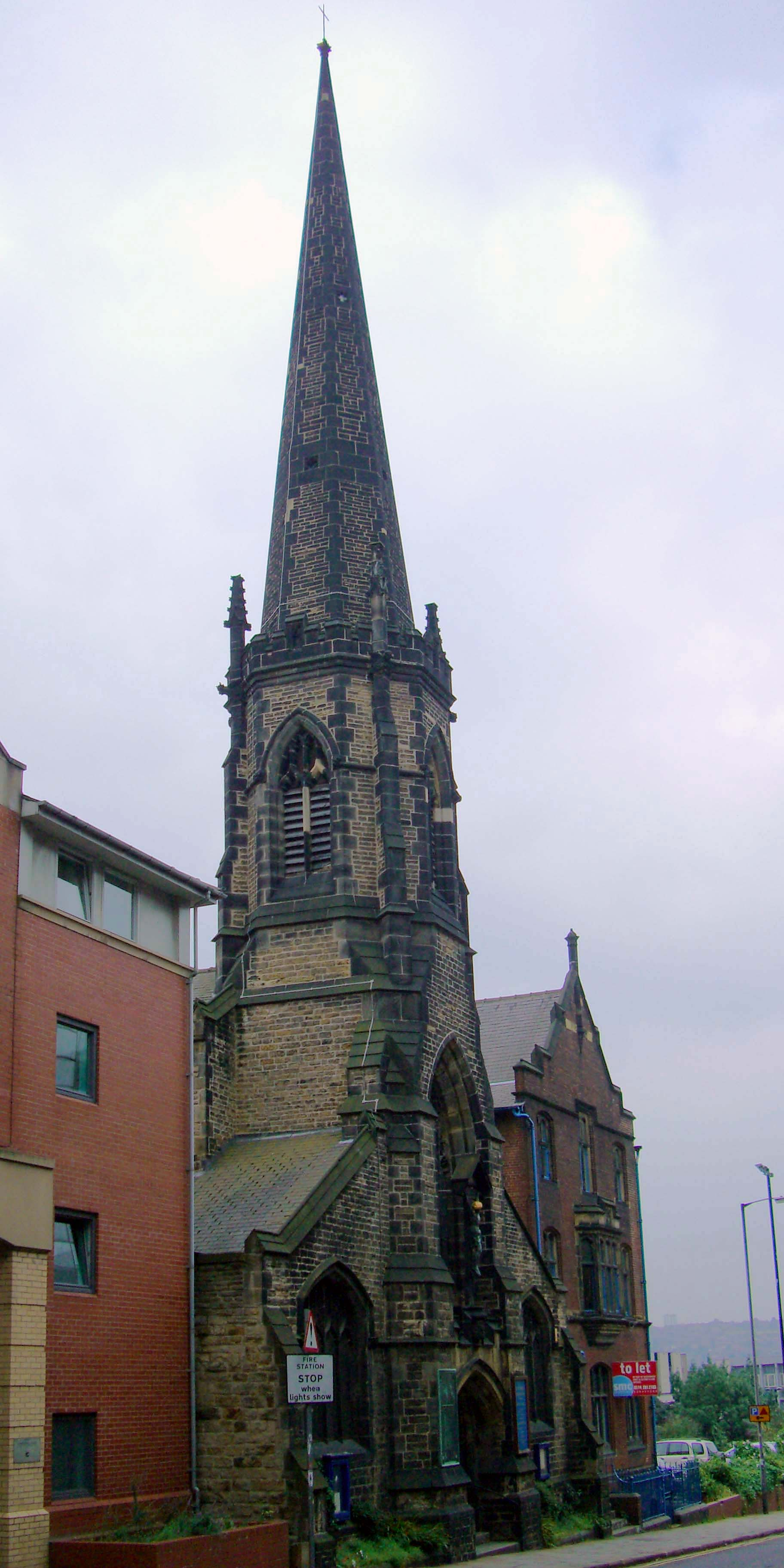
St Matthew's Church, Sheffield. By Flockton & Son; 1854–55.

William Flockton (1804–1864) was the son of Thomas Flockton, a carpenter and builder in Sheffield. He was brought up in his father's trade and established himself as an architect in 1833. From 1845 to 1849 he operated the business with William Lee and his son Thomas James Flockton as Flockton, Lee and Flockton, continuing in partnership with Thomas James Flockton as Flockton & Son until his death on 24 September 1864.

=== Buildings ===
Building	Date	Architects	Listed status
The Mount	1830	William Flockton	Grade II*
Wesley College	1838	William Flockton	Grade II*
Whirlow Grange Whirlow	1840	William Flockton	Unlisted
Ecclesall Bierlow Union Workhouse	1844	William Flockton	Grade II
Aizlewood's Mill	1847	Flockton, Lee and Flockton	Grade II
Holy Trinity Church (pictured)	1848	Flockton, Lee and Flockton	Grade II
Anglican Chapel at the Sheffield General Cemetery	1850	Flockton & Son	Grade II
Christ Church, Pitsmoor Road, Sheffield	1850	Flockton & Son	Grade II
Church of St Thomas, Brightside, Sheffield	1854	Flockton & Son	Grade II
St Matthew's Church, Sheffield (pictured)	1855	Flockton & Son	Grade II
Tapton Hall	1855	Flockton & Son	Grade II
St Andrew's United Reformed Church, Sheffield	1855–56	Flockton & Son	Grade II
Church of St Stephen, Sheffield	1857	Flockton & Son	Grade II
Church of St. Thomas and St. James, Barnsley	1858	Flockton & Son	Grade II
Church of All Saints, Headley (rebuilt 1380 nave)	1859	Flockton & Son	Grade II

== Thomas James Flockton ==
Thomas James Flockton (1823–1899), the son of William Flockton, was born in Sheffield on 21 May 1823. He started working with his father at the age of 12 before spending two years in London employed by Sir Gilbert Scott. He returned to Sheffield in 1845 and entered into partnership with his father. Two years before his father's death he became partners with George Lewslie Abbott, as Flockton & Abbott. After George Abbott retired in 1877 Edward Mitchel Gibbs entered the partnership as Flockton & Gibbs, finally being joined by Thomas Flockton's son Charles Burrows Flockton (1867–1945) in 1895 as Flockton, Gibbs & Flockton.

=== Buildings ===
Building	Date	Architects	Listed status
Endcliffe Hall	1865	Flockton & Abbott	Grade II*
Ranby Hall, nr Horncastle, Lincolnshire.	1865	Flockton & Abbott	
Royal Bank of Scotland building, Church Street, Sheffield	1866–7	Flockton & Abbott	Grade II
Church of St Barnabas, Highfield Place, Sheffield	1876	Flockton & Abbott	Grade II
Church of St Thomas, Newman Road, Sheffield	1876	Flockton & Abbott	Grade II
School Board offices, Firth College and Central Schools	1879–80	T. J. Flockton and E. R. Robson	Grade II
St John's Church, Ranmoor	1887	Flockton & Gibbs	Grade II*
Mappin Art Gallery	1887	Flockton & Gibbs	Grade II*
The Towers	1896	Flockton & Gibbs	Grade II
Sheffield and Hallamshire Bank, Wicker	1893	Flockton & Gibbs	
8–24 High Street, Sheffield (built for William Fosters & Sons Ltd.)	1897	Flockton, Gibbs & Flockton	Grade II
