= Tapton Hall =

House in Crosspool, Sheffield, England

Coordinates: 53.3757°N 1.5156°W

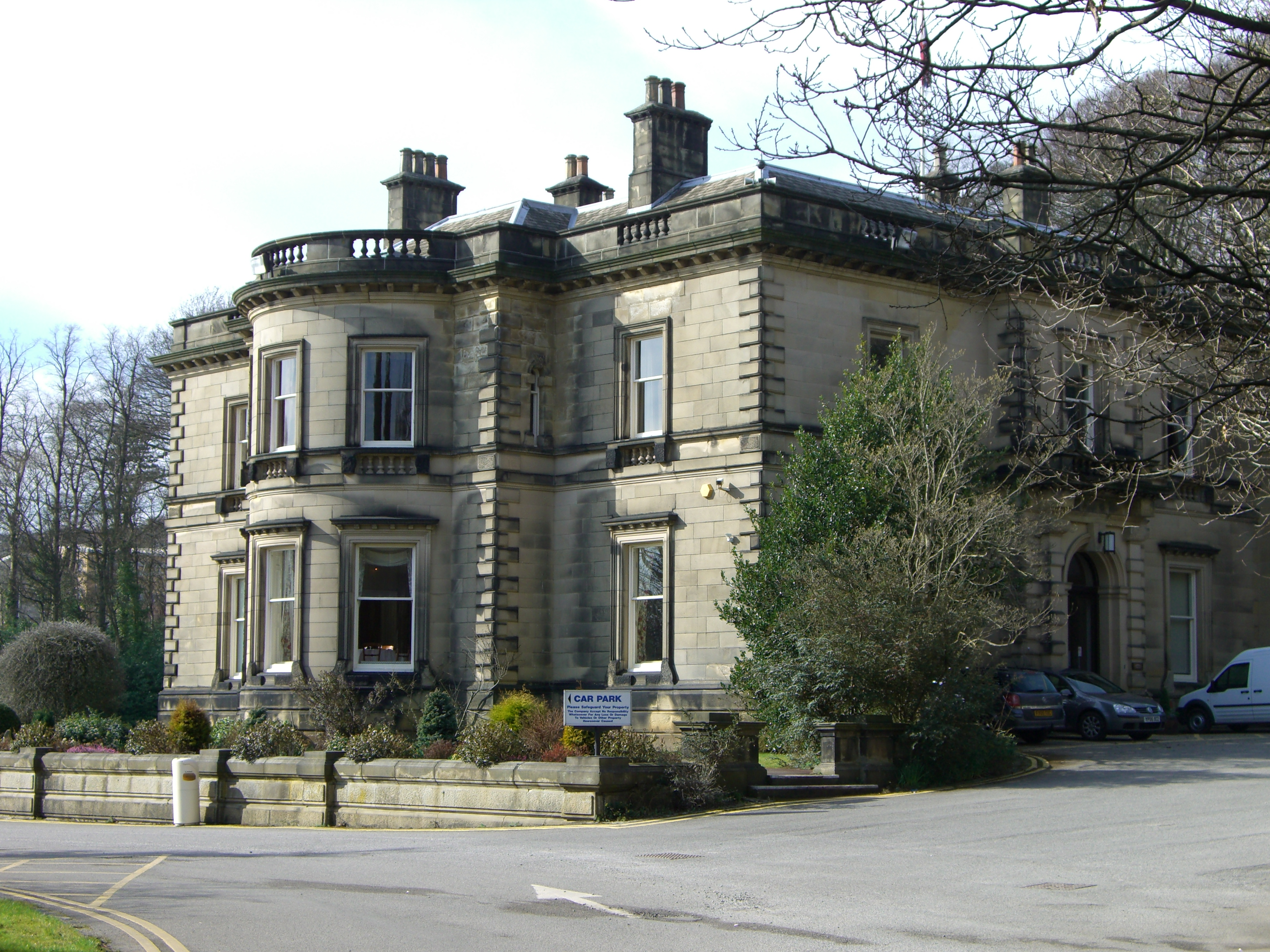

Tapton Hall is a Grade II listed building situated on Shore Lane in the Crosspool area of Sheffield, England.

== History ==
Tapton Hall was built in 1855, on the site of an earlier building known as Tapton Grove, recorded on the 1853 town plan of Sheffield. The date of the construction of Tapton Grove is unknown but it is known that Mary Shore (thus Shore Lane) lived in the house until her death in 1853 at the age of 96. Mrs Shore was the grandmother of Florence Nightingale and the young Florence often stayed at the house. Upon the death of Mrs Shore, the house was bought by Robert B. Mitchell who, within two years, sold the house to the Sheffield steel magnate Edward Vickers.

Vickers’ first action was to demolish Tapton Grove and erect Tapton Hall in its place. He used the architects Flockton & Son and the house was built in the Classical style with Italianate features. In 1867, the house was bought by George Wilson of the family of snuff manufacturers. Wilson paid £3,500 for Tapton Hall, plus £1,424 for the furniture and £218 for the wine left in the cellar. The hall was owned by the Wilson family until the late 1950s, being lived in by George Wilson's son George Kingsford Wilson (1853–1933) and then his grandson George Ronald Wilson (1888–1958).

Soon after the death of George Ronald Wilson in 1958 the hall was purchased by the Masonic Hall Company of Sheffield who had plans to refurbish and extend the building. In 1959, the Masonic Hall Company held a limited competition and invited architectural firms to submit plans for large-scale additions to meet highly specialised needs without detracting from the quality of the house. The competition was won by the Sheffield firm of Hadfield, Cawkwell, Davidson & Partners who restored and renovated the existing house, providing specialised suites of rooms and a new 30,000 square foot extension. The extension, which was completed in 1967, was built in a contemporary style and has been described as “large and uncompromisingly modern”. It comprises two floors and includes four temples, dining rooms and kitchen to serve 360 diners. The extension is constructed in grey brick, ashlar stone slabs and precast concrete cladding. A large abstract concrete mural symbolising the turmoil and chaos of the outside by William Mitchell stands at the members' entrance.

=== Present day ===
Today, Tapton Hall is a conference and banqueting centre which hosts weddings, civil ceremonies, corporate events and special occasions. The building is also used as a Masonic Hall.

== Architecture ==
The building is dominated by a large rounded two-storey bow window consisting of three sashes on each floor. The hipped slate roof is concealed by balustrades. The eastern entrance has a two-storey square porch. The interior has a grand entrance hall with an open-well staircase, moulded segmental arches, modillion cornice and a roof light.
