= William John Hale =

English architect, 1862–1929

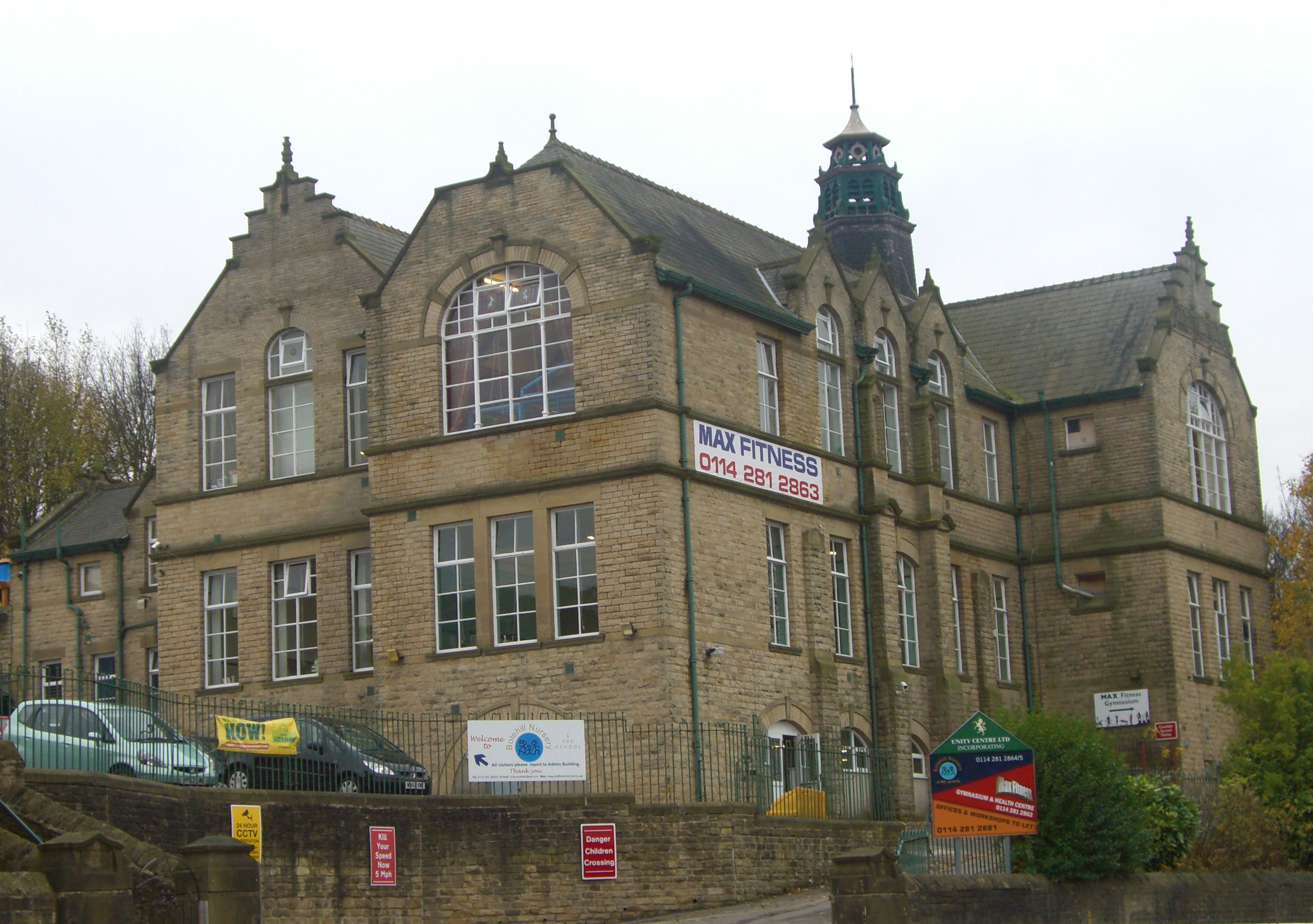
Bole Hill School.

William John Hale (March 1862 – 25 November 1929) was an architect based in Sheffield, England, who produced the city's most striking early 20th-century architecture. He practised between 1896 and 1929 and designed several schools and churches in Sheffield, using the Arts and Crafts and Art Nouveau styles as a basis.

== Biography ==
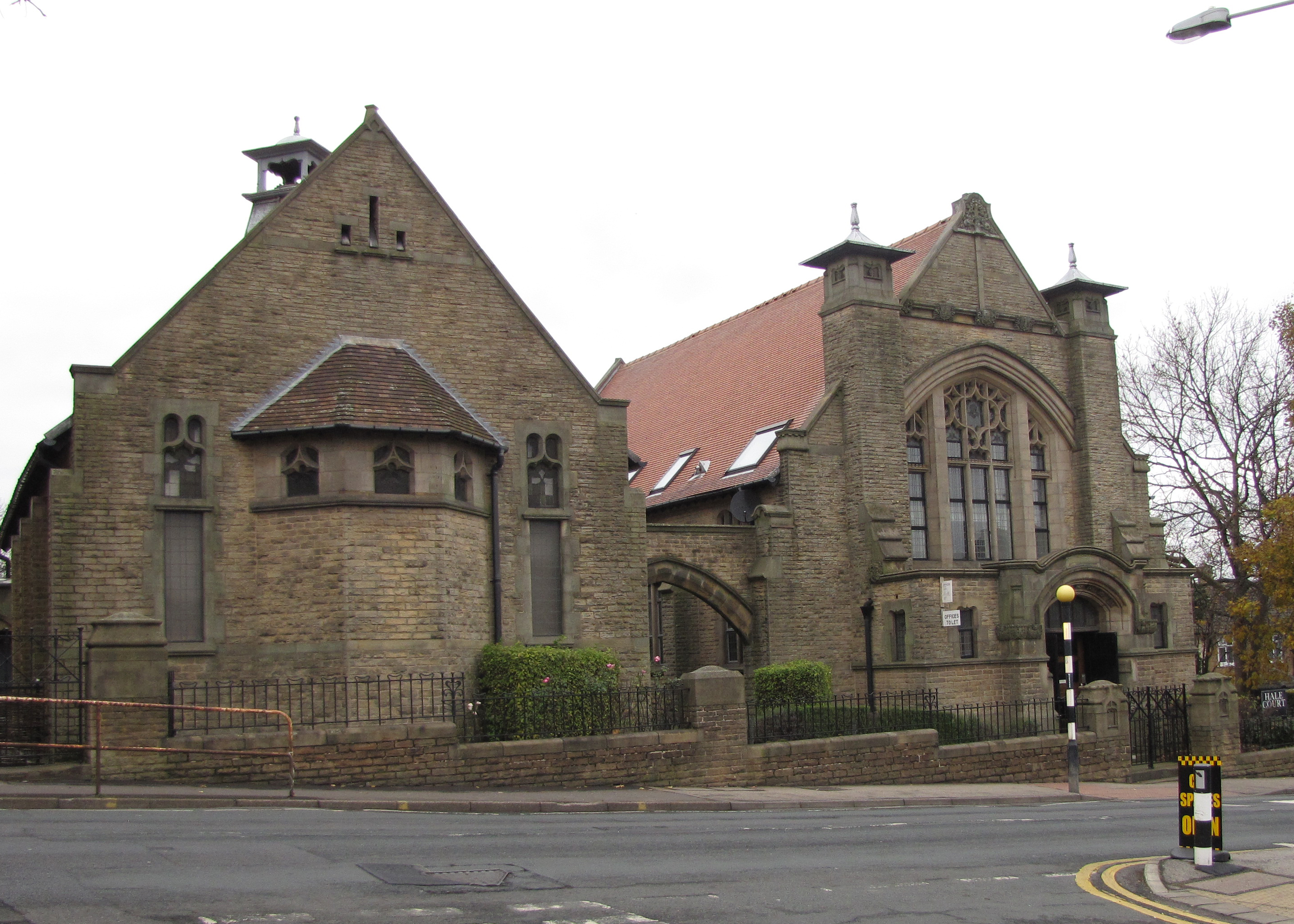
St Luke's Wesleyan Church. Now converted into apartments and called Hale Court.

Hale was born in Sheffield in March 1862, the third of four children of Matthew Hale and Harriet Fordham. He was brought up as a Wesleyan and was educated at Wesley College on Glossop Road in Sheffield. Upon leaving school Hale was articled to the well-known Sheffield architectural firm of Innocent and Brown. Amongst other work, the firm were responsible for designing 25 schools for the Sheffield School Board between 1873 and 1893 and the time spent by Hale as a trainee architect with the firm familiarised him with the requirements of school architecture. In 1887 Hale was a founder member of the Sheffield Society of Architects and Surveyors.

On 3 September 1891 Hale married Edith Toothill (1867–1942), at Wesley Church Broomhill. The Toothills were an affluent Methodist family from Fulwood, headed by John Toothill, who had amassed considerable wealth from property development. The newly wed Hales became members of Fulwood Wesley Chapel, a high-status place of worship in an affluent suburb. Hale's Methodist social connections would ensure him a steady stream of work in the years to come. In 1892 the couple's only child, Doris Mary, was born and on 1 December of that year Hale, at the age of thirty, established his own business as an architect. In 1895 he set up the family home at Cedar House, an Italianate villa in Taptonville Road, Broomhill.

=== Architectural career begins ===
Hale's first public commission for his company was the designing of Stephen Hill Wesleyan Chapel at Crosspool which opened in March 1896. It was a simple stone chapel with Arts and Crafts touches, which he would extend in 1899 by the addition of a lecture room. However his first really prestigious project was the planning of Bole Hill Board School at Walkley. At that time Sheffield was in a flurry of school building as a result of Forster's Education Act of 1870. Hale's experience with school design whilst training with Innocent and Brown was a big factor in winning the contract. The school, which opened in May 1896, is an impressive building set above the Rivelin Valley. Initially it had places for 815 pupils and today it is still in excellent condition despite its exposed position: a tribute to Hale's design and the quality of materials used.

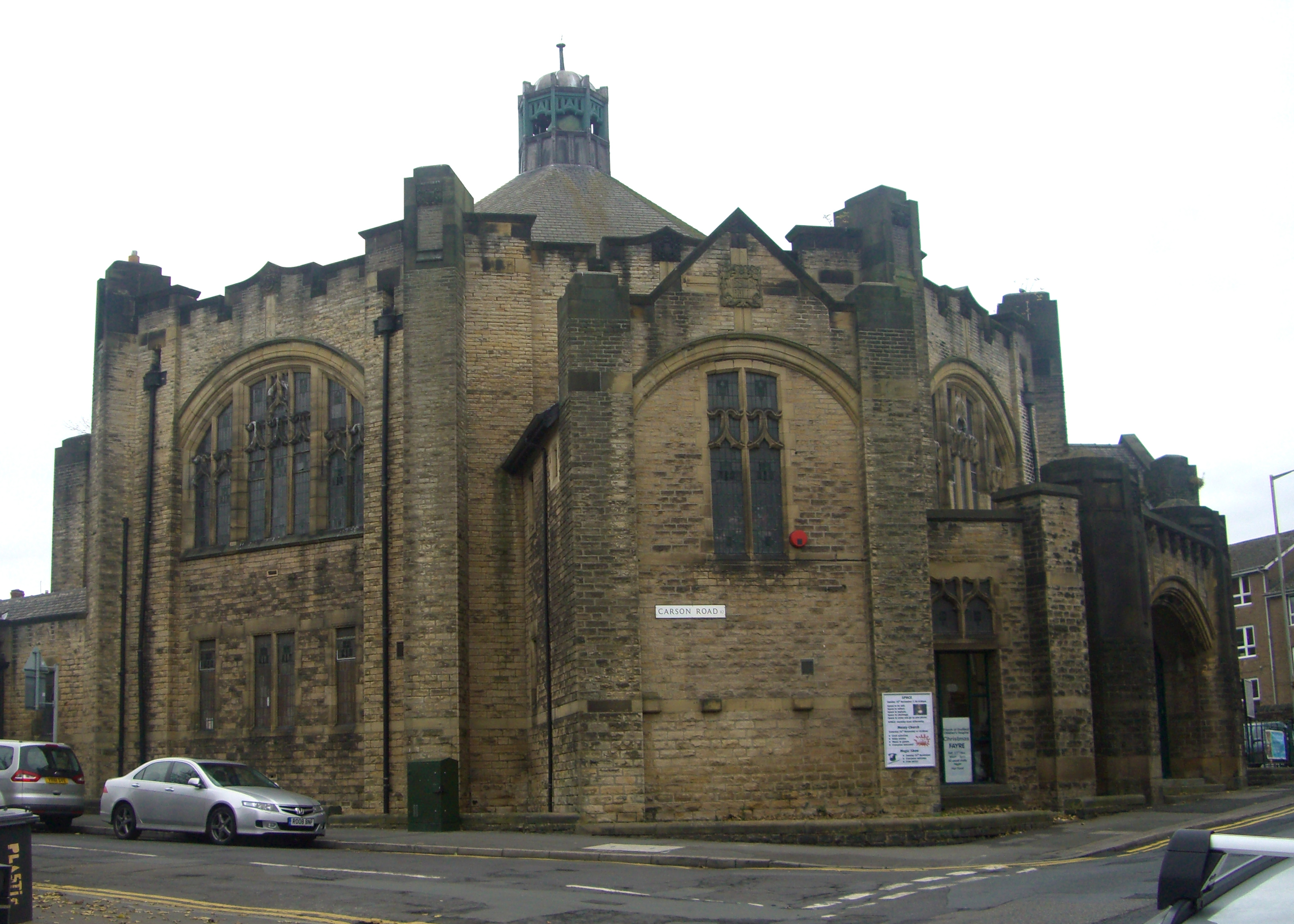
Wesley Hall at Crookes.

A further three Wesleyan chapels were built to his designs at Brightside, Low Bradfield and St Luke's at Crookes in the years up to 1900. The Ibbotson family were generous benefactors to the Low Bradfied project, allowing Hale to indulge in detailing which a small village could not otherwise have afforded. A similar situation arose at St Luke's with Samuel Meggitt Johnson, owner of the George Bassett confectionery company, who paid for the entire cost, with Hale finishing the building with some flair and facing the building with Bole Hill stone and a Matlock stone dressing, with intricate carving by Frank Tory.

=== Finest work ===
Hale did his finest and best-known works between 1904 and 1908. Hammerton Street Council School is widely regarded as a triumph, as is the arts and crafts school in Sheffield. It opened in October 1904 and cost £14,000. It features windows with elaborate lintels, ornate keystones over the doors and decorative drainpipes, as Hale introduced aspects of Baroque into his work. Between 1906 and 1908 Hale constructed two large, octagonal churches in the Crookes suburb in Sheffield. The Congregational Church at the top of Springvale Road had seating for 700, while the Wesley Hall in Crookes had seating for 900. Hale's decision to use an octagonal design was not an original idea, as there were 14 examples of eight-sided Methodist chapels in the 18th century. He may have been influenced by John Wesley's thinking, who believed the design offered better acoustics for the preacher, along with improved use of space for seating and a clear view for the congregation.

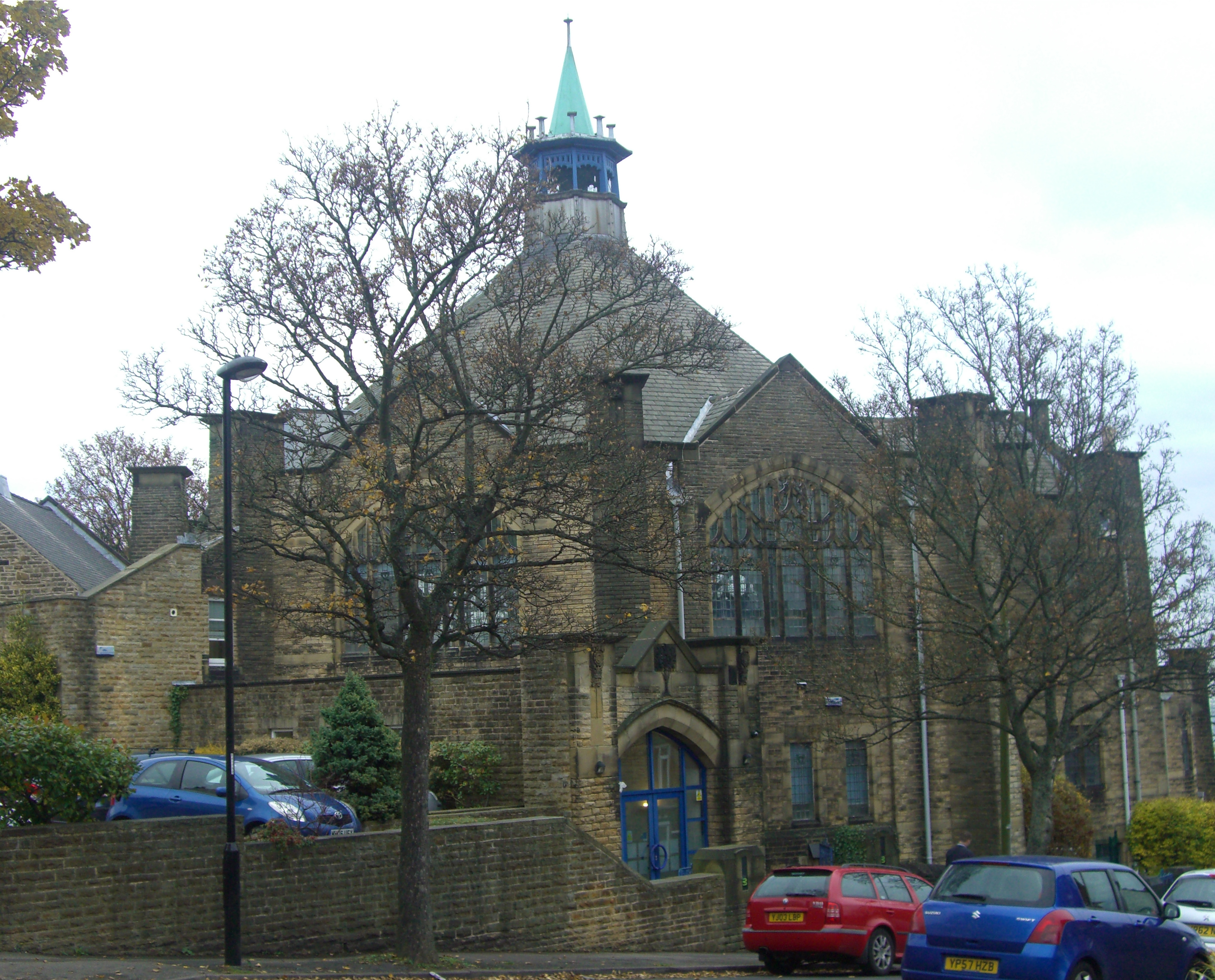
Crookes Congregational Church.

In 1907 Hale completed another commission for the Sheffield Education Committee. Lydgate Lane Council School at Crosspool was a continuation of the Arts and Crafts style used successfully at Hammerton Street, but the school was no duplicate and has a distinctive design built in gritstone from the Bole Hill or Bell Hagg quarries. In 1908 Hale became involved in the design of Victoria Hall in central Sheffield. He had finished second in a competition to design the building to the firm of Waddington, Son and Dunkerley, but after the death of the original architect, William Angelo Waddington, in January 1907, Hale took over. The extent of Hale's alterations to the original plans is unclear, but the tower and its uppermost elevations were considerably changed.

=== Career break ===
In 1909 Hale and his family moved from Taptonville Road to the even more select district of Ranmoor. Hale designed the new house on Snaithing Lane, calling it Tainby. It was solidly constructed in stone with the front facing south-west away from the road. It had careful Arts and Crafts detailing around the windows and doors, which lifted it above the design of the surrounding houses. The move coincided with Hale taking a ten-year break from designing major projects. It is not known why Hale did this, but it is clear that from around 1914 he suffered from a heart condition, and that his daughter learnt to drive specifically so that she could chauffeur him around. Other possibilities are that he was involved in war work or that he wanted to relax and enjoy his new house. Hale was president of the Sheffield Society of Architects between 1909 and 1911 and at the same time was involved at the University of Sheffield's Architectural Department.

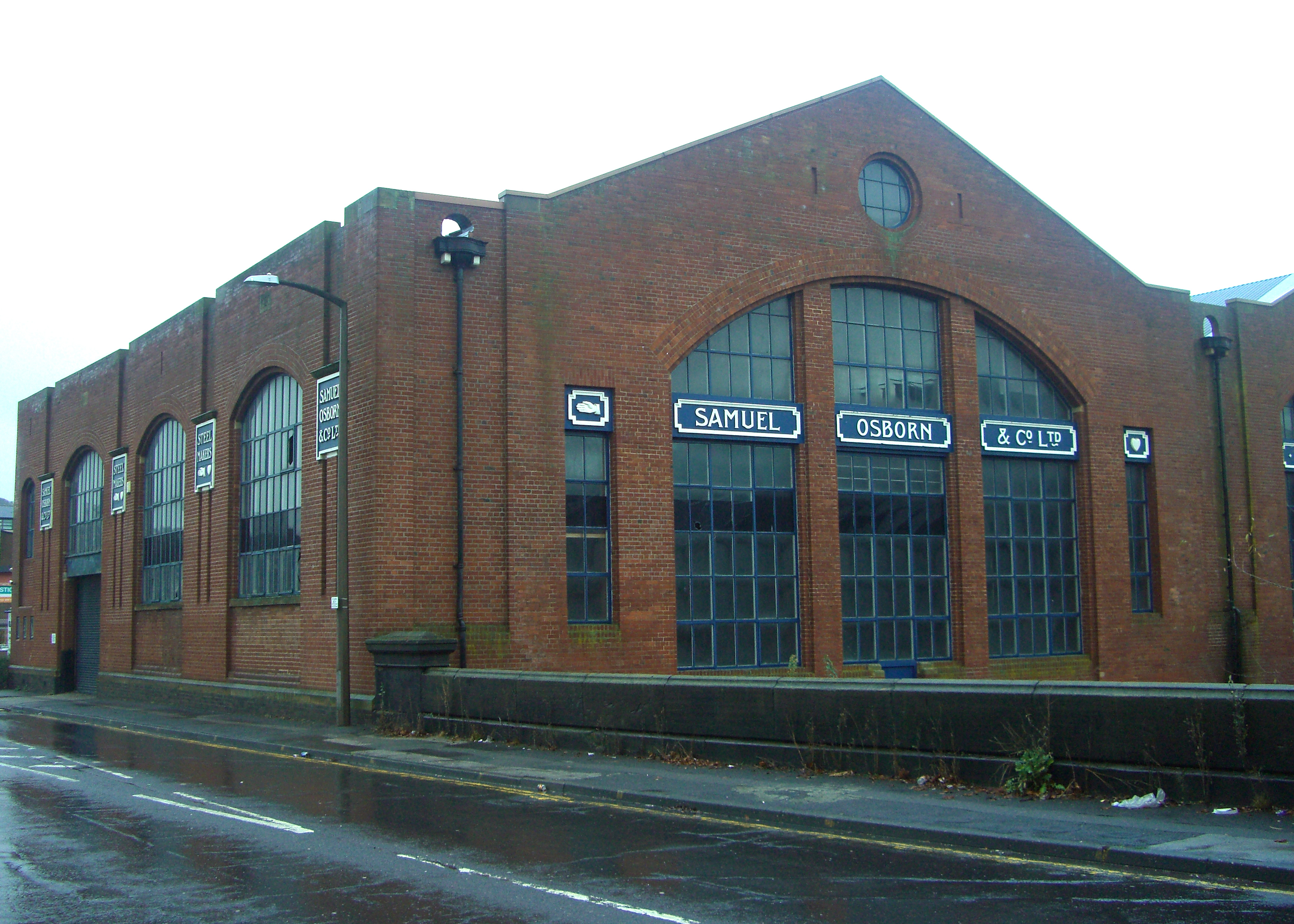
The Rutland Works railway spring shop at Neepsend. Now home to the Church – Temple of Fun.

=== Return to work ===
In 1919 Hale's near neighbour in Snaithing Lane, W. F. Osborn, owner of the Samuel Osborn Steel Company, asked him to design a new railway spring shop at the Rutland Works in Neepsend. This is Hale's only known industrial building. It has large segmental headed windows, subtle architectural detailing, and relief panels advertising the name and trademarks of the firm. Hale built his daughter Doris a new house in Snaithing Park Road, near to his own, upon her marriage in 1921 to Maurice Cole of the Cole Brothers department store.

Hale's final career phase was between 1926 and his death in 1929, during which time he constructed five churches in a strong geometric modern style, with little historical detailing. It has been suggested that Hale's plain style to his work in this period reflects the sobriety that followed World War I. This is best illustrated at Banner Cross Methodist Church which resembles a huge war memorial not unlike a cenotaph. Hale's final work, Bents Green Methodist Church, was completed after his death by his pupil G.R. Bower to Hale's plans.

On 25 November 1929, William John Hale died at his home Tainby in Ranmoor, Sheffield, aged 67. Obituaries noted his work for the Sheffield Society of Architects and Surveyors and his membership of Fulwood Wesley. He left an estate with a net value of £7,000, allowing his widow Edith to live comfortably in Sheffield until her death in 1942.

== Known works by William John Hale ==
Building	Date Opened	Location	Listed status/Present use
Stephen Hill Wesleyan Chapel	11 March 1896	Manchester Road, Crosspool, Sheffield	Unlisted. Incorporated into larger building in 1954
Bole Hill School	4 May 1896	Bole Hill Road, Walkley, Sheffield	Grade II. Used as a children's nursery and fitness club
Brightside Wesleyan Chapel	17 February 1898	Dearne Street, Brightside, Sheffield	Demolished for new housing
Low Bradfield Wesleyan Chapel	5 April 1899	Mill Lee Road, Low Bradfield, Sheffield	Unlisted. Now a private residence.
St Luke's Wesleyan Church	28 June 1900	Northfield Road, Crookes, Sheffield	Grade II. Now converted to private apartments and known as Hale Court.
Owler Lane School (1901 extension)	26 November 1901	Owler Lane, Grimesthorpe, Sheffield	Demolished in early 1990s.
Hammerton Street School	14 October 1904	Ouseburn Road, Darnall, Sheffield	Grade II. Renovated and owned by an educational charity
Crookes Congregational Church	28 November 1906	Springvale Road, Crookes, Sheffield	Grade II. Converted into offices in 1989.
Lydgate Lane School	15 November 1907	Lydgate Lane, Crosspool, Sheffield	Unlisted. Now Lydgate Lane Infant School
Wesley Hall, Crookes	18 June 1908	Crookes / Carson Road, Crookes, Sheffield	Grade II. Remains a church building
Rawmarsh Wesleyan Chapel	9 July 1908	High Street, Rawmarsh, Rotherham	Unlisted. Now Rawmarsh Methodist Church
Victoria Hall	24 September 1908	Norfolk Street, Sheffield	Grade II. Remains a church building
Tainby	1909	Snaithing Lane, Ranmoor, Sheffield	Unlisted. Hale's private house. 1909 -1929. Still a private house.
Rutland Works Spring Shop	1919	Rutland Road, Neepsend, Sheffield	Grade II. Owned by Bring Me the Horizon frontman Oliver Sykes, the building is now the vegan bar/eatery Church - Temple of Fun.
Rydal	1921	Snaithing Park Road, Ranmoor, Sheffield	Unlisted. Built for his daughter Doris on her marriage. Still a private house.
Attercliffe Wesleyan Mission Hall	16 September 1926	Attercliffe Road, Attercliffe, Sheffield	Demolished.
Carver Street Wesleyan Extensions	7 February 1929	Carver Street, Sheffield	Unlisted. Building still standing.
Banner Cross Methodist Church	13 July 1929	Ecclesall Road South, Banner Cross, Sheffield	Grade II. Remains a church building.
Southey Methodist Church	28 September 1929	Southey Rise, Southey, Sheffield	Unlisted. Remains a church building.
Bents Green Methodist Church	30 June 1932	Ringinglow Road, Bents Green, Sheffield	Unlisted. Remains a church building.

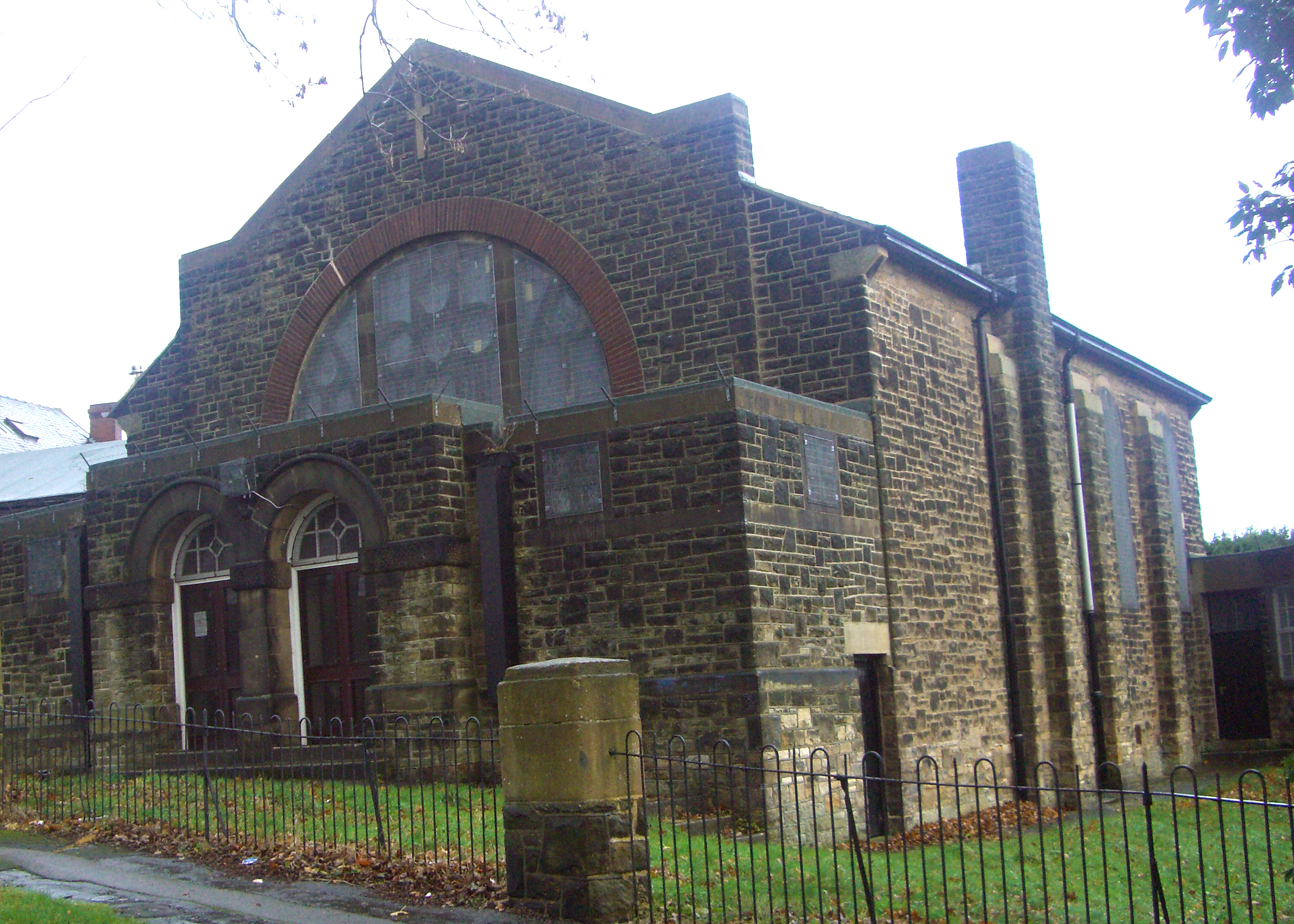
Southey Chapel.

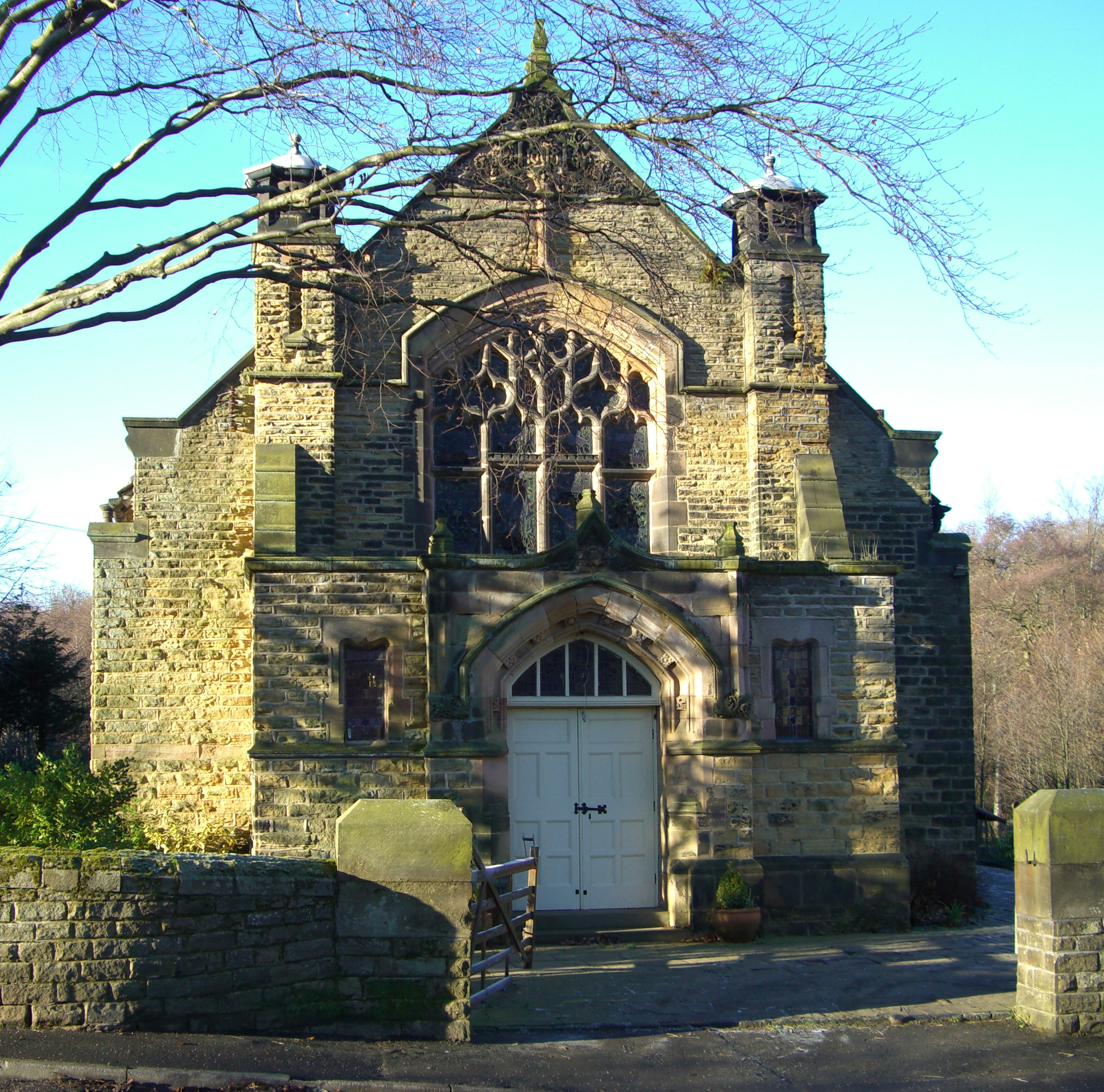
Low Bradfield Wesleyan Chapel.
