= Banner Cross Methodist Church =

Church in Sheffield, England

Coordinates: 53.360191°N 1.508692°W

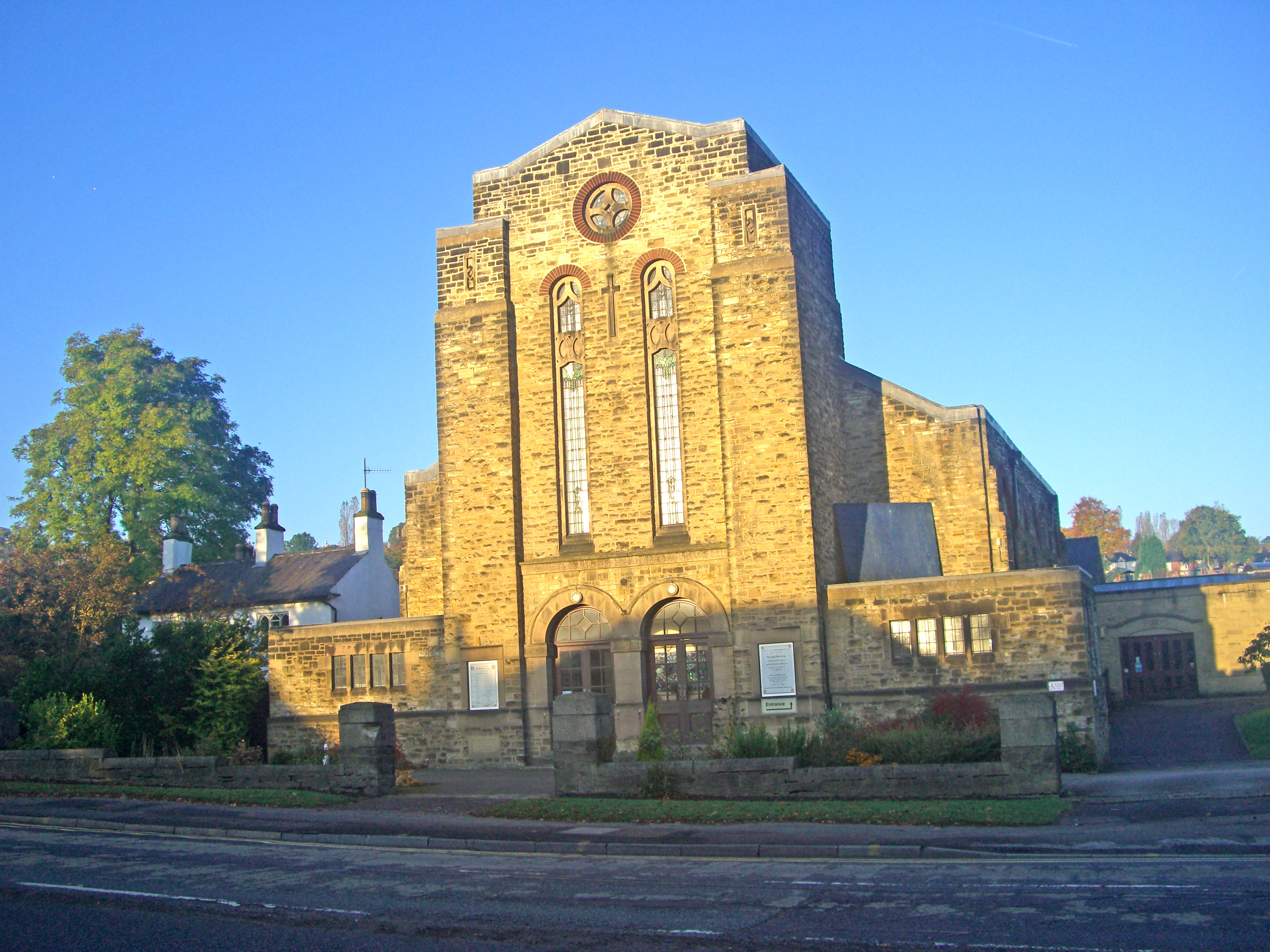
The church in 2018

Banner Cross Methodist Church is situated in the district of Banner Cross in the city of Sheffield, England. The church stands on Ecclesall Road South, 2.5 miles (4 km) south-west of the city centre. The church and attached schoolroom as well as the boundary wall and gate piers are all Grade II listed buildings.

== History ==
=== First church ===
Plans for a Methodist church in the Banner Cross district were formed in the early years of the 20th century when it was revealed that housing was to be built in the area. Prior to that Banner Cross had consisted mostly of farmland and secluded large halls and houses. In 1902 a group of trustees was formed to raise funds for a place of worship. Land was eventually purchased on Glenalmond Road, near its junction with Ecclesall Road South, and a church and school room was built at a combined cost of £3,034. The building was designed by the London architects George Baines and Son of Victoria Street and built by Charles Ward of Sheffield. It was opened on 27 June 1907 with the first minister being the Reverend W.H. Wheeldon. In 1921 a Church Extension Scheme was set up to raise funds for a larger place of worship on Ecclesall Road South next to the old church and on the same plot of land. By 1921 church membership had reached 200 and by 1928 £5,000 had been raised towards a new church.

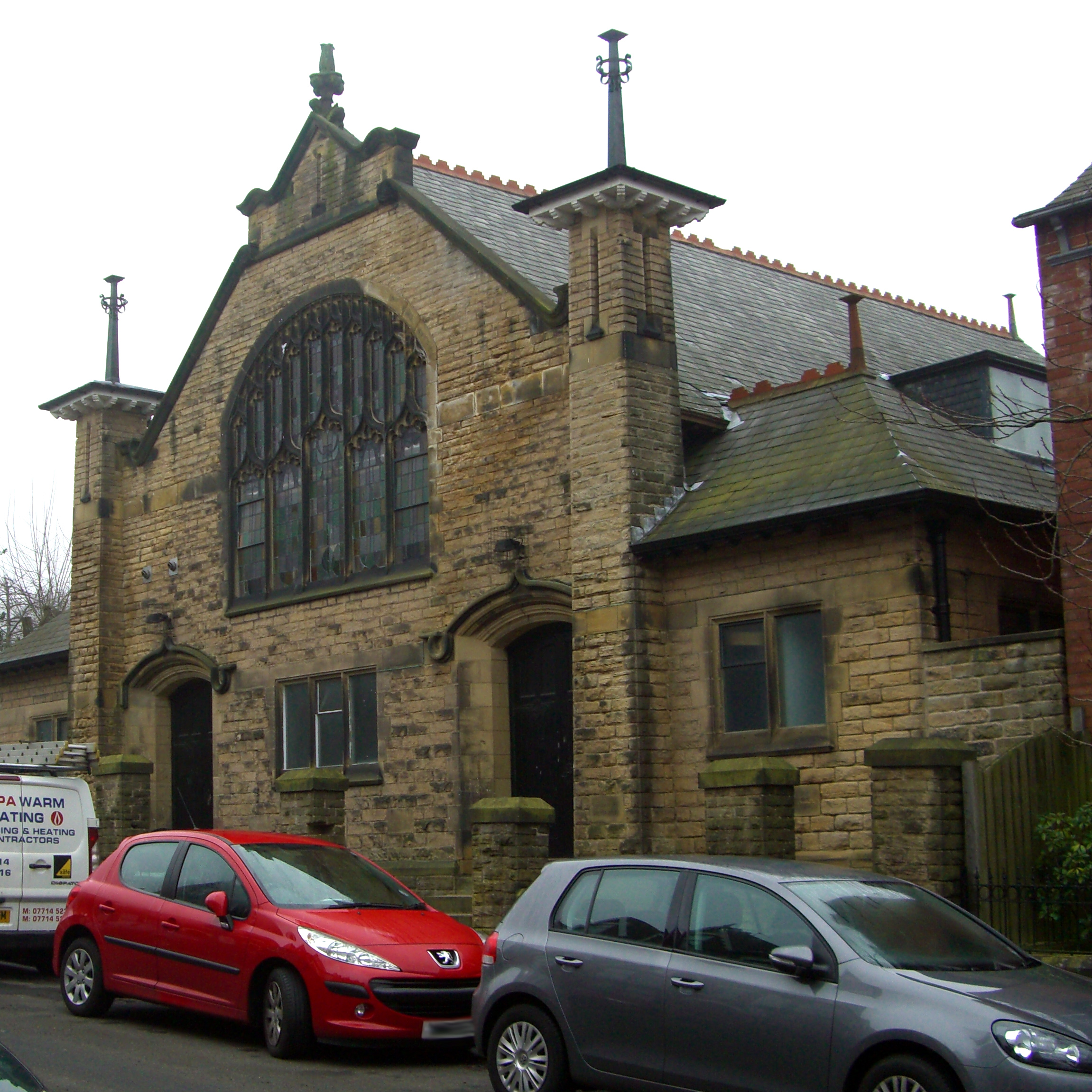
The original 1907 church facing Glenalmond Road, now used as additional rooms for activities.

=== New church is built ===
The architect of the new church was William John Hale who had previously built several churches and schools in Sheffield. The trustees authorised an overall budget of £10,000 for the church with £7,434 of this going to the builders W. Marlow and Sons Ltd. The official laying of the first stone took place on 21 April 1928 although on 30 June 1928 there was another stone laying ceremony organised by the Sunday School with 70 scholars taking part. The church was opened on 13 July 1929 with the dedicatory prayer given by the Reverend Richard Pyke. The old church was converted into a schoolroom and this enabled the Sunday school to expand and incorporate all its departments into one unit. A manse was built for the church in 1931 on Millhouses Lane and in 1937 a lecture hall was added to the church replacing an earlier wooden hut which had served the purpose for almost 20 years. During the Second World War one of the vestries was used as a library for the general public while the schoolroom was used as a Rest Centre. In 1962 the congregation was enlarged when the nearby Greystones and Montgomery Methodist Churches were closed.

=== Present day ===
The current minister at Banner Cross is Reverend Tim Crome, the 20th serving cleric since the church was established in 1907. Reverend Crome started his ministry at the church on 1 September 2012, taking over from Robert D. Lewis. The church is open daily for various activities such as Coffee Mornings, Parent and Toddler group, Lunch and Friendship group. Boys' Brigade, Youth Club, Bible study, Brownies, Rainbows and Girl Guides.

== Architecture ==
The church is built in the Gothic Revival style and is constructed from coursed squared stone with red brick dressings around some of the more decorative windows. The main tower of the church has a monumental look about it which has been compared to The Cenotaph in London. The design of the building is different from Hale's earlier churches, with a move away from complex detailing to a more simple style characterised by bold massing and rigid geometry. The adjacent 1907 church which now serves as the schoolroom is built in the Arts and Crafts style from rock-faced stone and brick, with ashlars dressings and gabled and hipped slate roofs.
