= William Henry Cutts =

Australian physician, general practitioner (1828–1897)

President of British Medical Association
- In office 1880–1881

Personal details
- Born: 25 December 1828 Chesterfield, Derbyshire, England
- Died: 3 July 1897 (aged 69) London, Middlesex, England
- Education: Wesley College, Sheffield
- Occupation: General practitioner

William Henry Cutts (25 December 1828 – 3 July 1897) was an Australian physician, general practitioner and gold broker.

== Early life and background ==
Cutts was born in Chesterfield, Derbyshire, England on 1828. He was the youngest son of John Cutts. He received his education at Wesley College in Sheffield. From 1844 to 1849, he served as an apprentice to Thomas Jones, an apothecary and surgeon in Chesterfield. Following this, he pursued his medical studies at Edinburgh, earning his M.D. degree in 1851. In the same year, he became a licentiate of the Society of Apothecaries of London. Additionally, he spent a brief period studying in Paris, where he developed a deep admiration for the renowned French surgeon, Auguste Nélaton (1807–1873).

== Life ==
Cutts arrived in Melbourne aboard the Kent in September 1852. He initially ventured to the Ovens goldfield and later made his way to Bendigo. In addition to practicing medicine, he also engaged in the profitable occupation of buying gold for the banks. However, Cutts found the demanding lifestyle to be unfavorable and decided to return to Melbourne in 1853. He successfully established his medical practice in the west end of the city and continued to serve his patients until his retirement. Known for his kindness, tolerance, and friendly demeanor, Cutts earned the trust of his patients and maintained positive relationships with his colleagues, despite the prevalent jealousies and quarrels within the profession. Over time, he became increasingly involved in the medical community. In 1858, when the staff of the Melbourne Hospital expanded, Cutts was elected as an honorary physician, a role he held for seventeen years. He played a pivotal role in the establishment of the Medical Society of Victoria, joining its committee in 1859 and eventually becoming its president in 1866. Additionally, he contributed to the founding of the Victorian Medical Benevolent Association in 1865, where he served as both treasurer and president. Cutts was a strong advocate for the Australian Medical Gazette and frequently contributed to its publication. In 1879, he played a key role in establishing the Victorian branch of the British Medical Association and served as its president in 1880–81.

== Personal life ==
Cutts wedded Jane Thorpe in 1857 and together they raised a sizable family. Following her death, he entered into matrimony with Isabella Rathie in 1895. Isabella, who had received her training at the esteemed Royal Edinburgh Infirmary, served as a sister in Hobart before assuming the role of matron at the Melbourne Hospital in January 1890. During her tenure, she successfully implemented a structured nurse training program.

== Death ==
Cutts died on 3 July 1897.
