= Victoria Hall, Sheffield =

Church in Sheffield, South Yorkshire, England

Coordinates: 53.3817°N 1.4669°W

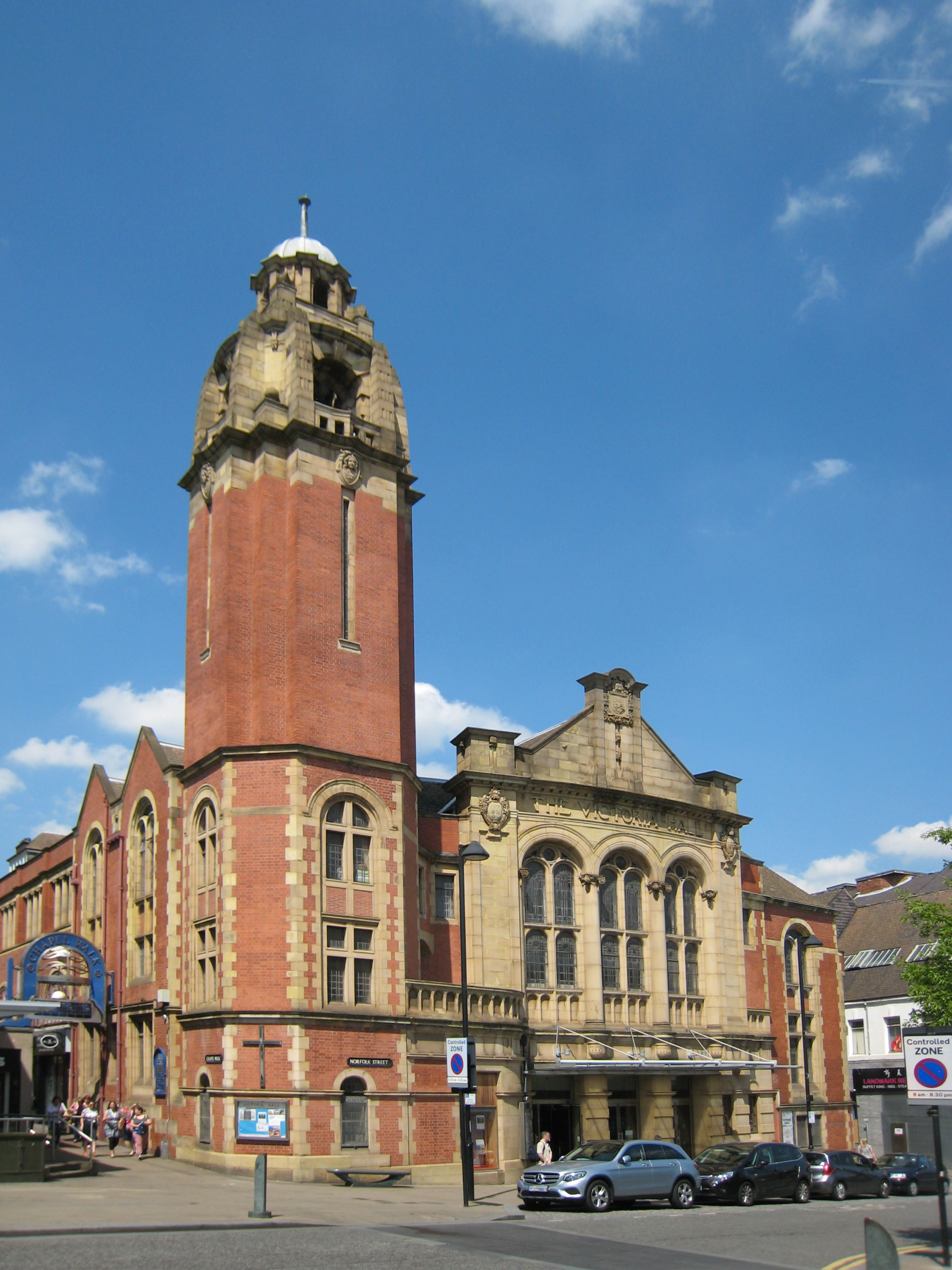
Victoria Hall seen from near the Crucible Theatre.

The Norfolk Street Wesleyan Chapel, built in 1780 and demolished in 1906 to make way for the Victoria Hall.

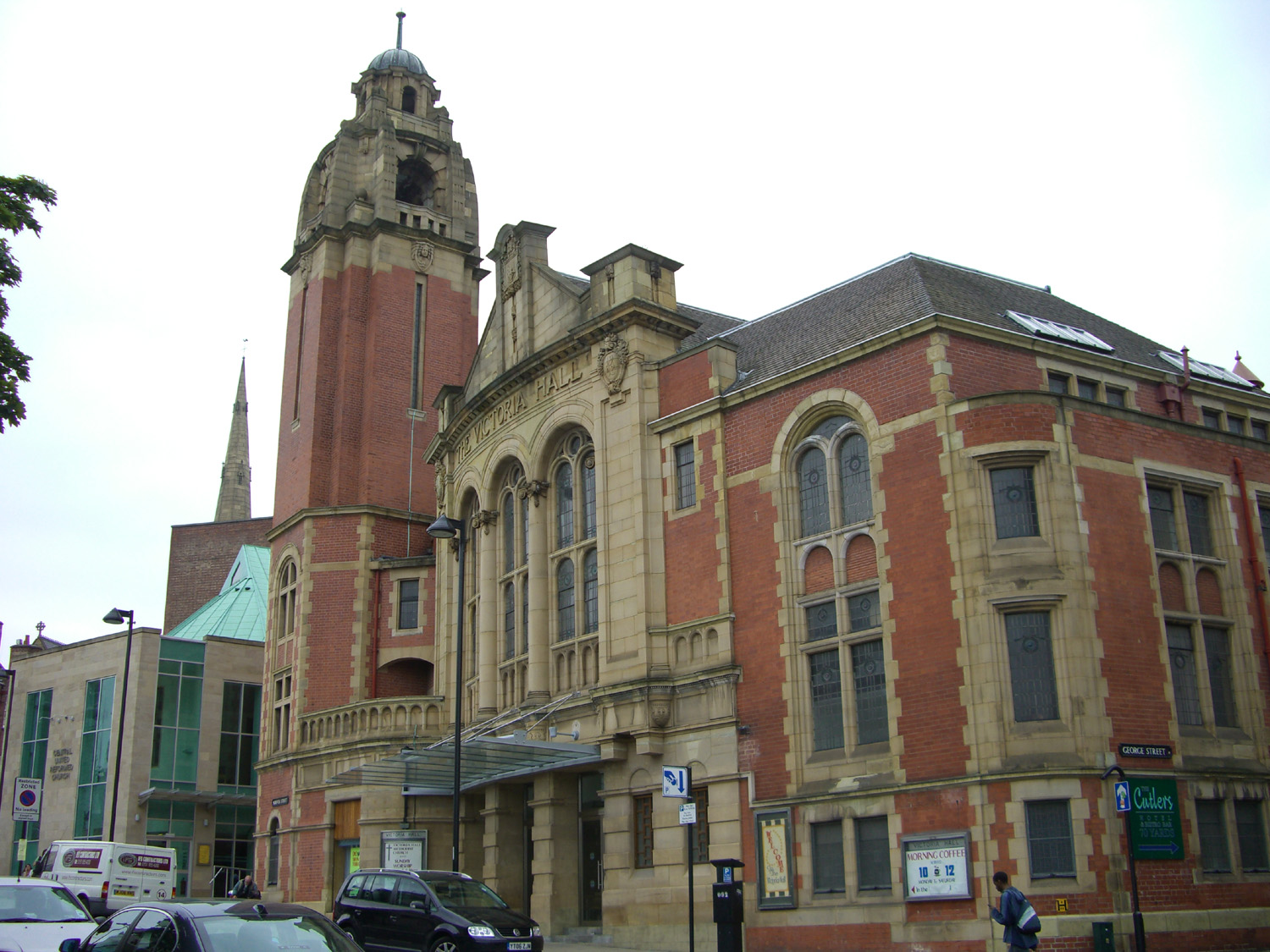
An alternative view seen from the junction of Norfolk Street and Arundel Gate.

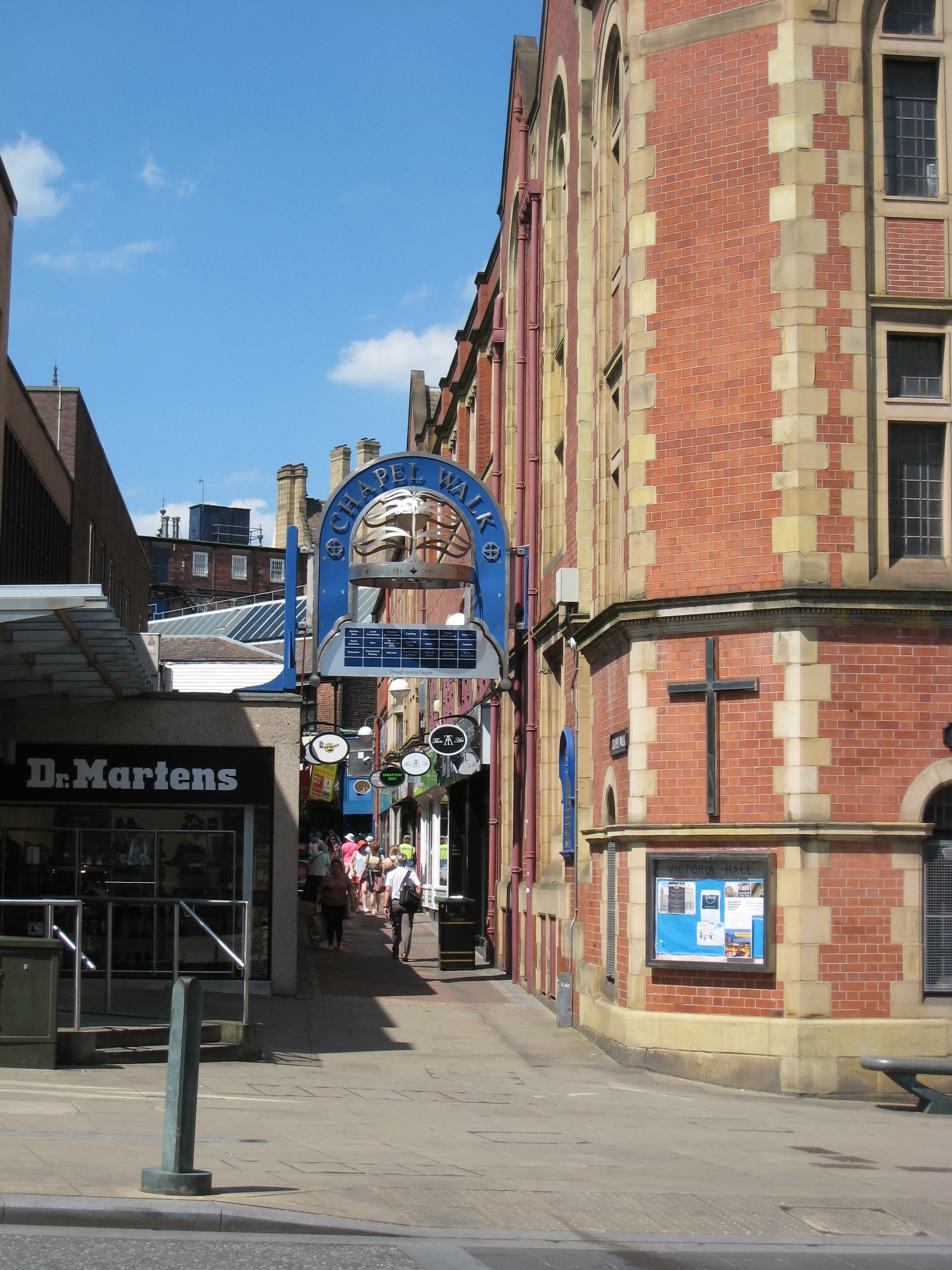
Chapel Walk

Victoria Hall is a Methodist place of worship situated on Norfolk Street in Sheffield city centre. It is the most important Methodist building in Sheffield and it is a Grade II listed building. It is a large many roomed building which stands between the side streets of Chapel Walk and George Street. Although the main entrance to the church is on Norfolk Street, there is a separate administration entrance on Chapel Walk.

== History ==
=== Original chapels ===
The origins of Methodism in South Yorkshire date from 1742, when John Wesley arrived in Sheffield on a preaching tour and founded the nucleus of the Sheffield Methodist Society. They met at a small wooden meeting house in Cheyney Square which was on the site of the current Town Hall. The meeting house was destroyed in a riot in 1743 during a service conducted by Charles Wesley and a new chapel was built on Mulberry Street at the expense of the local magistrates for failing to keep the peace. The Mulberry Street chapel was used for worship by the Methodists until 1779 when the Norfolk Street Wesleyan Chapel on the present site of Victoria Hall was completed. The Chapel was opened and consecrated in 1780 by the 77-year-old John Wesley, who described it as "One of the largest in the Kingdom" and presented the new building with a set of silver communion vessels. Despite substantial renovation and the introduction of new vestries in 1875 at a cost of £6,000, the building was demolished in 1906 to make way for a more distinguished and larger structure. The old building was closed for the last time on 13 May 1906.

=== New hall built ===
On 26 September 1906 the foundation stone for the new Victoria Hall was laid followed by a celebratory lunch at the Cutlers Hall. The Hall was opened on Thursday 24 September 1908 with the final cost being in excess of £40,000, a huge sum at the time, but the Wesleyan mission cleared the debt within three years. The total expenditure included the outlay for extra land, with Sheffield entrepreneur Thomas Cole donating land for an enlarged site for the new church. The new Hall was originally designed by Waddington Son & Dunkerley but much of the design was re-worked by William John Hale (1862–1929) in 1908. Hale blended Gothic and Arts and Crafts styles and was instrumental in designing the large Baroque top to the tower. The carved decorations on the hall are by Alfred and William Tory and portrayals of the Wesley brothers are integrated into the design.

The new hall was part of the Forward Movement of the Methodist church inspired by Hugh Price Hughes who called for a national religion which preached to the poor and resulted in the building of Central Halls in most of Britain's large cities. One of the Hall's first accomplishments was to set up the Sheffield Mission Labour Yard in Joiner Lane off The Wicker. This tackled the high level of unemployment of the time and by June 1909 had provided 5,903 days work to almost 6,000 men. The yard closed in 1915 as the First World War reduced unemployment to virtually nil. The Hall has always had strong connections with Trade unionism and in September 1909 the Trades Union Congress held its annual conference at the hall, since then various unions have held meetings there. In the Hall's early days the surrounding area was densely populated and thousands of young people attended Sunday School, Scouting, Girl Guides and Boys' Brigade.

=== Wartime ===
During the First World War the Hall opened its doors to care for the members of the armed forces and after the end of the conflict the Hall received a visit from King George V and Queen Mary during their visit to Sheffield in 1919. The king presented medals to the returning soldiers from the platform in the sanctuary. During the years of the Great Depression the Hall served free breakfasts to needy children and distributed food parcels as well helping the unemployed. Prior to the completion of the Sheffield City Hall in 1932, the Victoria Hall was the leading concert venue in the city with many leading orchestras playing concerts there. In the Second World War the hall survived the Sheffield Blitz air raids of December 1940, with The Messiah being sung to an audience of over 200 people on the Sunday after the raids. On 9 May 1941 part of Victoria Hall was converted into a rest hostel for the Forces with 20 beds, this was later expanded to 35 beds.

== Present day ==
Today the hall stands in an important position in the city centre, across from Tudor Square and close to the Crucible and Lyceum theatres. As well as a place of worship, the Hall is used by various voluntary organisations including meals for the homeless. It is a popular venue for classical music concerts and the function room is available for hire by the general public.
