= The Towers, Sheffield =

Country house in Sheffield, South Yorkshire, England

Coordinates: 53.377098°N 1.534186°W

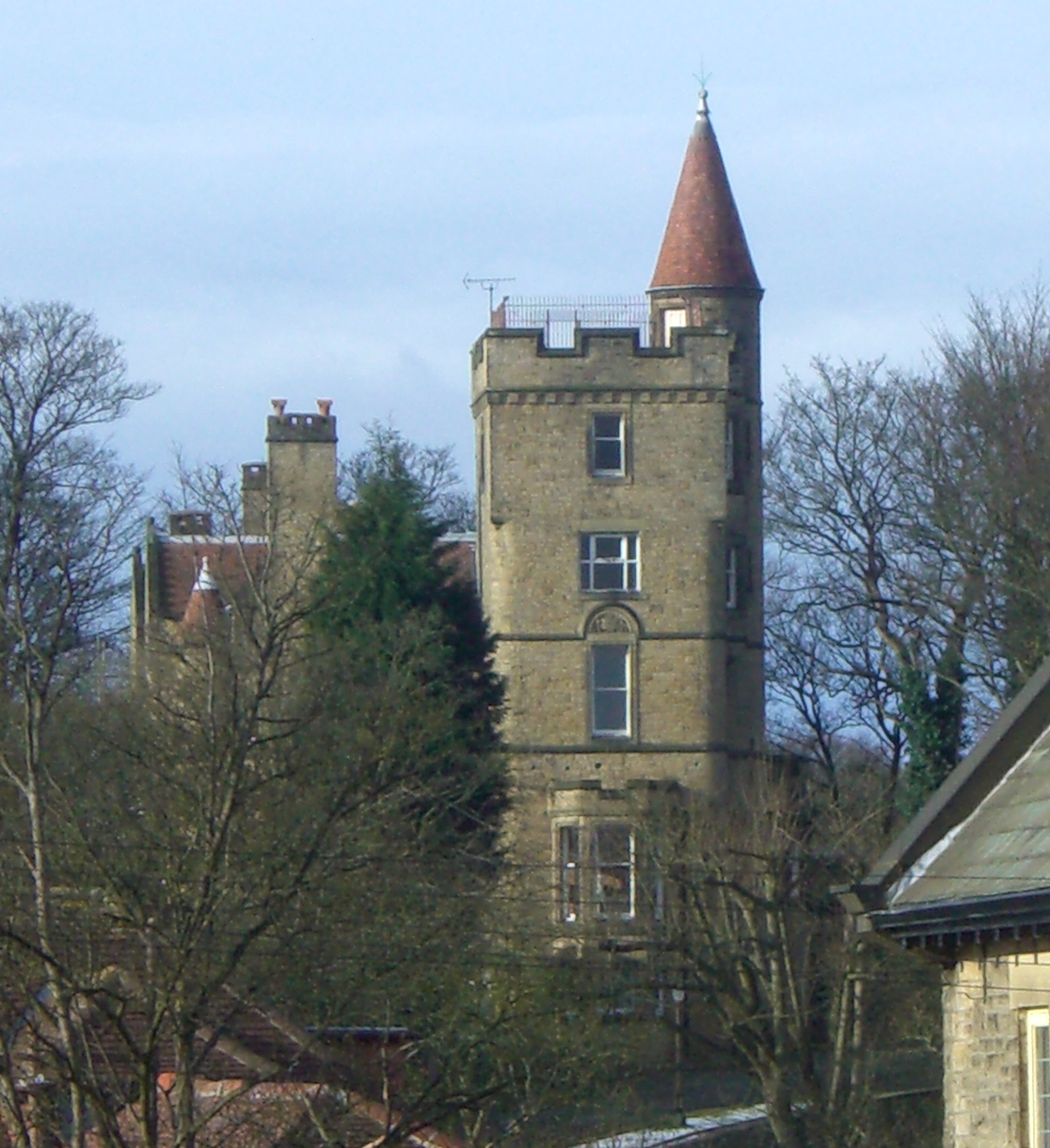
The eastern side seen from Sandygate Road.

The Towers is a small English country house situated in Sheffield, England. The house stands on Sandygate Road close to the junction with Coldwell Lane in the suburb of Crosspool. It is a Grade II listed building as is the lodge and attached gateway and the concave garden wall. It has been described as “an extraordinary Scottish baronial fantasy”.

== History ==
The Towers which is constructed in the Scottish Baronial style was built by the architects Flockton & Gibbs in 1896, the house was built on the north side of what had been a public pleasure ground in the early 19th century, set up by George Woollen, owner of the Rivelin Corn Mill. The Towers was built for Christopher D. Leng (1861-1921), the son of W. C. Leng, editor of the Sheffield Daily Telegraph from 1864 until his death in 1902. Christopher D. Leng succeeded his father as joint owner of the newspaper. Leng was also an agriculturist and had the house built in what was then a rural situation with a small dairy farm attached and set up his company The Sheffield Model Dairy Ltd. which applied modern (Canadian) dairy farming methods to produce its own dairy products for retail.

The house was extended to the west in 1905 and a low curtain wall was constructed with eight small towers built at the angles. Christopher Leng became something of a local character, he was a keen golfer and was influential in founding the nearby Hallamshire Golf Club which he opened in 1897. He also became involved in the campaign to save Endcliffe Hall in 1913, in 1920 he became engaged in setting out the housing on Den Bank Avenue. He died suddenly on New Years Day 1921, aged 59. After Leng’s death the house was used for various purposes, during World War II The Towers provided a temporary headquarters for the Sheffield tool firm Spear & Jackson when their offices were bombed. In 1954 Sheffield City Council opened the house as a centre for handicapped children. In 1996 the house was purchased and restored and is now back in use as a private residence.

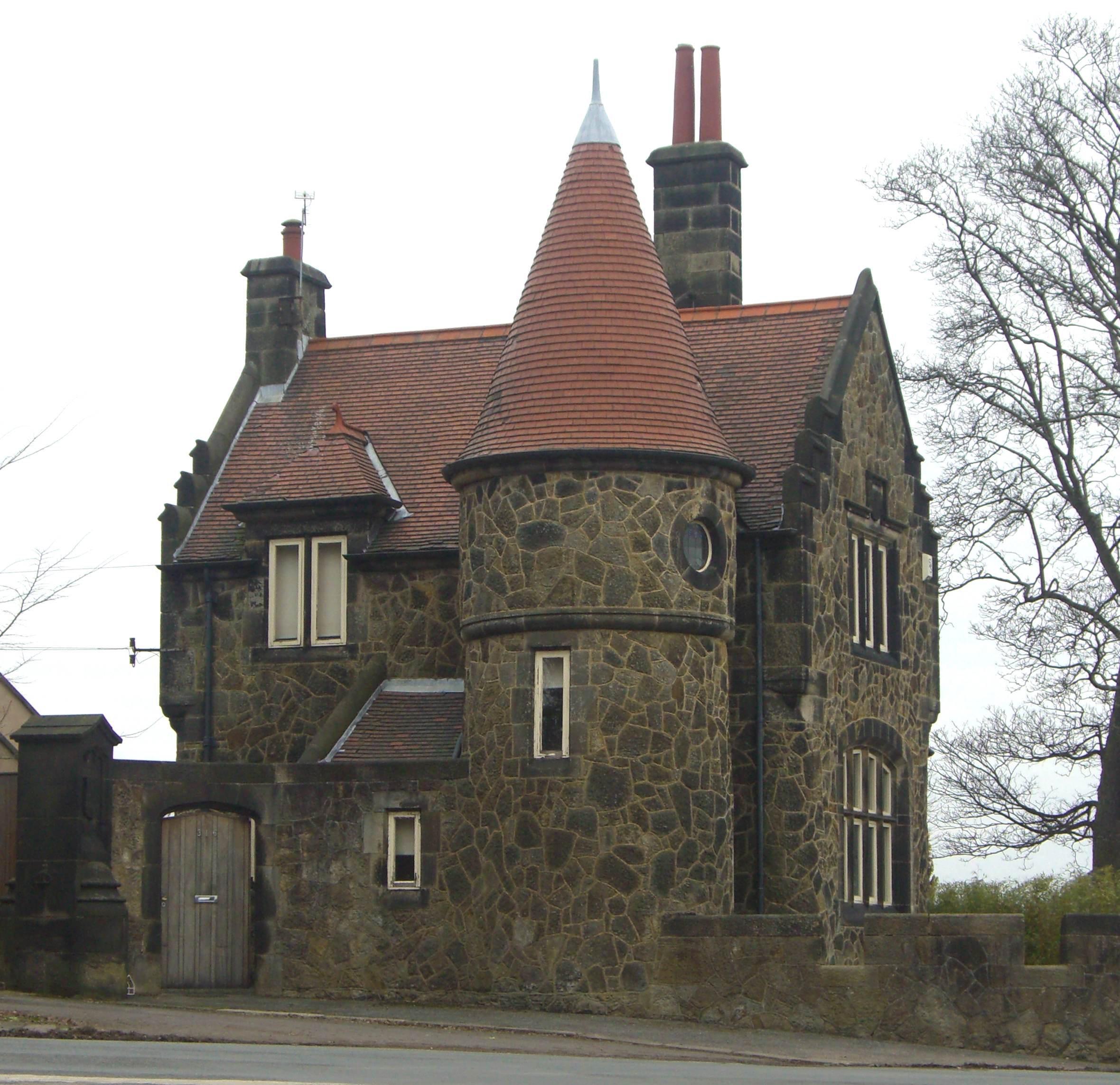
The lodge is also Grade II listed.

== Architecture ==
The house is constructed from coursed rubble with ashlar dressings, it has a plain tile roof and all windows are sash design. The houses most striking features are at the east corner with the tall battlemented main tower and its attached even taller circular stair turret with conical roof. The tower has five storeys and features two storey oriel and bay windows. The south facing frontage is two storey with two further smaller conical turrets, it faces onto a large lawn. There is extensive use of Crow-stepped gables which along with the turrets are integral elements of the Scottish Baronial style. The interior has kept much of its original embellishments, including a panelled entrance hall. Most of the original doors, doorcases, skirting, coving and fireplaces survive. The lodge is constructed in the same style as the main house with an attached round tower with conical roof. The attached gateway has ashlars piers and wooden gates.
