= Wesley College, Sheffield =

Defunct school in South Yorkshire, England

Coordinates: 53.3762°N 1.4957°W

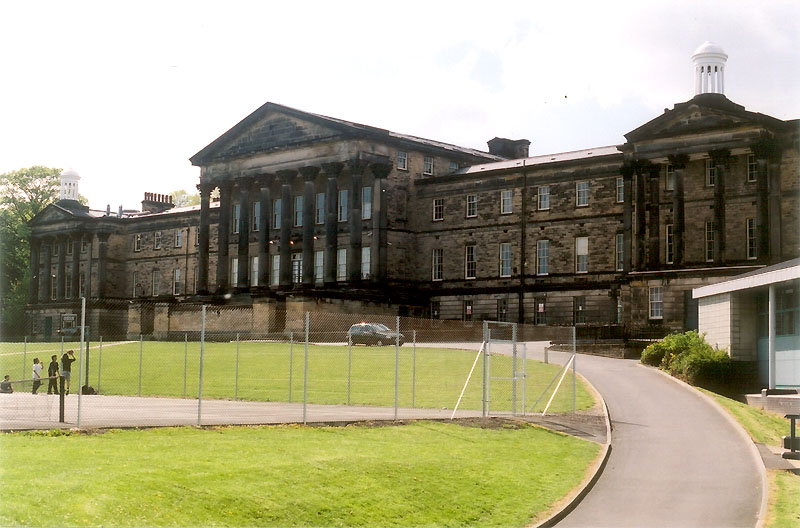
- The former Wesley College, now King Edward VII School
- Sheffield; England

Information
- Established: 1838
- Closed: 1905

Wesley College was a school in Sheffield, South Yorkshire, England, from 1838 until 1905, when it was merged with Sheffield Royal Grammar School to form King Edward VII School.

== History ==
The school, whose mission was to educate the sons of the laity, opened in 1838 in new buildings designed by William Flockton on Glossop Road, Sheffield. It was founded by Rev. Samuel Dousland Waddy (1804–1876) to "supply a generally superior and classical education, combined with religious training in the principles of Methodism" and was initially called the "Wesleyan Proprietary Grammar School". The change in name to Wesley College seems to have taken place in 1844, when a "Royal Warrant, constituting the Sheffield Wesley College a college of the University of London was forwarded to Mr Waddy (subsequently Governor, from 1844 to 1862) by Sir James Graham, which empowered the college to issue certificates to candidates for examination for the several degrees of Bachelor and Master of Arts, and Bachelor and Doctor of Laws". A year later it spurred Rev. James Gillman, William Ferguson, William Stewart and Thomas Waugh in Dublin, Ireland to consider creating a similar school in Dublin. The school accepted its first 90 boarders on 8 August 1838. By 1841 the number of pupils had increased to 172.

In 1905 Wesley College was purchased by Sheffield Council and merged with Sheffield Royal Grammar School to form King Edward VII School (Upper School Site), named after the reigning monarch.

== Headmasters ==
1837–1853	John Manners, M.A.
1853–1888	Henry McE Shera, M.A. LLD.
1888–1891	Joseph J. Findlay, M.A. Ph.D.
1891–1905	Valentine W. Pearson, B.A.

== Governors ==
1837–1842	Rev John McLean
1842–1844	Rev Isaac Keeling
1844–1862	Samuel Dousland Waddy
1862–?	Rev John James
	Rev John Harvard
	Rev William Jessop
1879–1888	Rev William Dallinger FRS

Wesley College was run from 1837 to 1888 by a 'Dyarchy', comprising the Governor and the Headmaster, the Governor being the senior of the pair (in theory).

== Notable alumni ==
- Robert Bownas Mackie (1820–1885) – English politician and judge
- Samuel Danks Waddy (1830–1902) – English politician, Judge (son of Samuel Dousland Waddy, above)
- William Haswell Stephenson (1836–1918) – Lord Mayor of Newcastle upon Tyne
- Frederick Cawley, 1st Baron Cawley (1850–1937) – cotton merchant and Liberal politician
- Leonard Cockayne (1855–1934) – horticulturist, botanist
- Hillson Beasley (1855–1936) – architect
- John Bilson (1856–1943) – architect
- Frank Wilson (1859–1918) – Premier of Western Australia
- Cecil Henry Wilson (1862–1945) – Labour MP for Attercliffe
- William John Hale (1862–1929) – architect
- John Andrew Pearson (1867–1940) – architect in Canada
- William Henry Cutts (1828–1897) – physician

== Notable teachers ==
- Henry Perlee Parker (1795–1873), drawing-master (1840-1844)
