= Hallam Chase =

Fell race in South Yorkshire, England

The Hallam Chase claims to be the oldest continuously-run fell race in the world and a part of Sheffield's sporting history, being open to South Yorkshire road and fell-running clubs only.

The race's origins lie in 1862, when Hallam F.C. promoted the start of their football season by organising a ten-mile steeplechase. The event was won by T. Moore of the rival Sheffield F.C. and generated great attention. Numerous similar events were launched in the region. The following year, a second run from Hallam F.C.'s Sandygate ground was organised. Described as the Great Hallamshire Steeplechase, runners went to Christ Church, Stannington, and back again, J. C. Shaw of Hallam winning on this occasion.

During the 19th-century, the event remained highly popular, with a crowd of 20,000 spectators reported in 1883, and there was much betting on the results. Runners spent a significant time preparing for the race, and it was known for some strong runners to enter in disguise, in the hope of deceiving the bookmakers' handicapper. However, bookmakers were also known to employ "nobblers", who would obstruct the leading runners at gates and stiles along the route, to aid the runners on whom they would make a profit.

In 1887, organisation of the event was taken over by the Hallamshire Cricket Club, and it was for the first time run under the rules of the Amateur Athletic Association. However, crowds fell, and in 1894, it was decided to again permit professional athletes. This change was not considered a success, with only 3,000 spectators attending. By 1900, the event was again being organised by the football club. Over the years, all the other local steeplechases were abandoned, but the Hallam Chase continued, with breaks around World War I and World War II.

The course, of about three-and-a-half miles, has long been regarded as extremely challenging due to its steep slopes. In the early 20th-century, it was nicknamed the "Race Across the Alps". Sebastian Coe took part in the event as a club runner with the Hallamshire Harriers. He described the course as "bloody horrific. Down the rocks into a ravine, up the rocks on the other side. Down the rocks again and up the rocks scrabbling with hands and feet".

The fell race is now always on the Tuesday evening after the second bank holiday in May, starting 20:00 from the Hallamshire Cricket Ground. It is open to male and female runners from South Yorkshire road and fell running clubs, under a handicap system. The handicap is set so the slower runners go off first and the quicker runners last- the idea being that all the runners return together. This may have the effect of discouraging stronger runners from taking part.

The course record of 19:42 was set by Trevor Wright in 1968, although given the handicap system Terry Allcock (Hallamshire Harriers) was the winner of that year's race.
