= Brown Bayley Steels =

Steel-making company in Sheffield, England

Brown Bayley Steels was a steel-making company established in Sheffield, England in 1871, as Brown, Bayley & Dixon. They occupied a site on Leeds Road which was later occupied by the Don Valley sports stadium. The firm was founded by George Brown, nephew of John Brown of the firm John Brown & Company. The firm manufactured Bessemer steel and railway tracks.

Notable among its employees was Harry Brearley, the inventor of stainless steel. Brearley left Firths after a dispute over the patents and was offered a position at Brown Bayley, where he was appointed works manager and then became a director.

== The Brown Bayley steelworks, ==
The company occupied a 32-acre (130,000 m^{2}) site.

"View of a 1950s Engineering Apprentice";

== The melting shop ==
Scrap steel, loaded by overhead cranes using electromagnetic grabs into containers. These were fed into the Siemens Martin Open hearth furnaces via charging machines which tipped the “coffin-like" 6-foot-long (1.8 m) 18-inch-wide (460 mm) loading containers directly into the furnaces. The furnaces were heated by water gas and coal gas made on site, and fed to the furnaces by 36-inch (910 mm) gas mains.

The molten steel had alloying metals added; after sampling and satisfactory laboratory confirmation of the molten metal's composition the furnaces were tapped out into preheated bottom-pouring ladles, which held some 20 tons of steel each. The ladles were manoeuvred by an overhead crane into the casting bays where they were poured over several ceramic runner systems, which each fed six preheated one-ton ingot moulds. After cooling, the ingot moulds were stripped of the still hot ingots and taken to the ingot yard. In the 1950s, the transport from the Open Hearth Casting Bays to the ingot yard was by steam lorry, or on the internal steam railway system. As of 2016, a fully restored original example of one of the steam lorries carrying the Brown Bayley livery can be found at the Riverside Museum in Glasgow.

After cooling and weathering selected ingots would be transported to the machine shop where they were placed on ingot planing machines to remove the scaled outer surface and allow examination for cracks and impurities. Impurities were gouged out with chisels using pneumatic “chipping hammers” or by manually operated swing frame grinding.

Electromagnets carried ingots to the skid pusher behind the reheat furnaces of No.1 Mill. These furnaces were again heated by on site-produced raw coal gas.

=== No1 Mill ===
No1 Mill was a 30-inch (760 mm) reversing cogging mill driven by a several hundred horsepower electric motor through a Krupp gearbox. The cogging stand reduced the 12-inch-square (300 mm) section ingot to either slab or bar of 9-inch (230 mm) section. All hot material was moved at ground level on live roller paths. The second and third stands reduced material to either square or round bar of 4-inch (100 mm) section, or plate of 2-inch (51 mm) section.

The first stand had a hydraulic manipulator, which turned the material for rolling and also aligned it with a hydraulic accumulator driven hot shear, which cut off the red-hot ingot runner head of 9-inch-square (230 mm) section in 3 seconds. The manipulator then aligning the ingot with the reducing rolls making several passes to make the required section.

After rolling to the ordered section the red hot steel ran along ground level live roller paths to the hot saws or hot shears. The hot saws had a 4-foot-diameter (1.2 m) carbon steel saw blade similar to a woodworkers circular saw, but running with a constant cooling water spray to the teeth. These hot saws were capable of slicing through 4-inch (100 mm) bar in seconds with showers of sparks and the screaming metal emitting a noise of 110 decibels.

Hot shears also cropped the bar to length, but left indentations in the end of the bars, where hot sawing left a straight, clean cut. The bars were then lowered into cooling pits before being taken to heat treatment and bar-straightening machines.

Round bar straightening was done in machines known then as “Reelers” with a convex and concave roller paired together at an angle, the action of which both straightened and fed the bar whilst passing it through the machine. Again the entry chute to the machine was a lidded box built to contain the flailing bent bars which emitted a very loud rattling noise.

=== Special steels ===
Electric arc furnaces also produced steels using scrap from “T’Top Bank”. Many tons of armaments arrived at the Top Bank for melting down, including Oerlikon and other anti aircraft guns which arrived by rail for destruction and recycling into steel for peaceful uses.

Two high-frequency electric furnaces produced one-ton melts of special steels in an area close to the main electric arc furnaces.

=== No6 Mill ===
No6 Mill was a three-high rolling mill with several stands (Sets of Rolls) producing bar down to thick wire sizes from red hot billets taken from the reheat furnaces. The small diameter rod and bar produced in this mill snaked all over the cast iron floor plates. The operators used tongs to catch hold of the end of the red hot bar as it left the rolls, passed the bar around their body allowing it to loop out onto the floor and then entered the bar into the next pass position. In one hot summer the floor plates expanded, the expansion could not go anywhere and two plates buckled upwards like flagstones directing the hot metal into the air – within milliseconds there was no one on the mill floor as the metal reared up towards the roof and collapsed in a writhing heap as the mill rollers continued to spew out the rest of the bar.

== The works ==
=== Leeds Road ===
- Spring Shop
- Hammer Shop
- Ring rolling shop Telpher Crane
- Axles- railway
- Axle and railway tyre drop test
- Heat Treatment Department
- Creep Laboratories
- Tyre Blank Press
- Machine shop axles tyres
- Blacksmiths Shop
- Loco Shed
- Drawing Office
- Generator converter house DC for Cranes

=== East Works ===
- Sheet Rolling Mill
- Sheet pickling plant
- Sheet Polishing and guillotine Shops
- Stekel Mills - slitting machines

=== Bright Bar Shop ===
- Bar Drawing
- Centre-less Turning Machines
- Centre-less Lidkoping Grinding Machines
- 5 Ton hammer
- 500 Ton press
- Railway tyre rolling mill

== See also ==
- List of companies in Sheffield
- Kelham Island Museum has a vast archives of information available for researchers and public displays from the history of Sheffield steel, with artefacts from old steel works. A lot of the local history books use material from their collection of photographs.
