= Endcliffe Hall =

Mansion in Sheffield, South Yorkshire, England

Coordinates: 53.372°N 1.5133°W

Endcliffe Hall is a 19th-century, 36-room mansion situated on Endcliffe Vale Road in the City of Sheffield in the suburb of Endcliffe. The hall is situated just over 2 miles (3.2 km) west of the city centre and is a Grade II* Listed building.

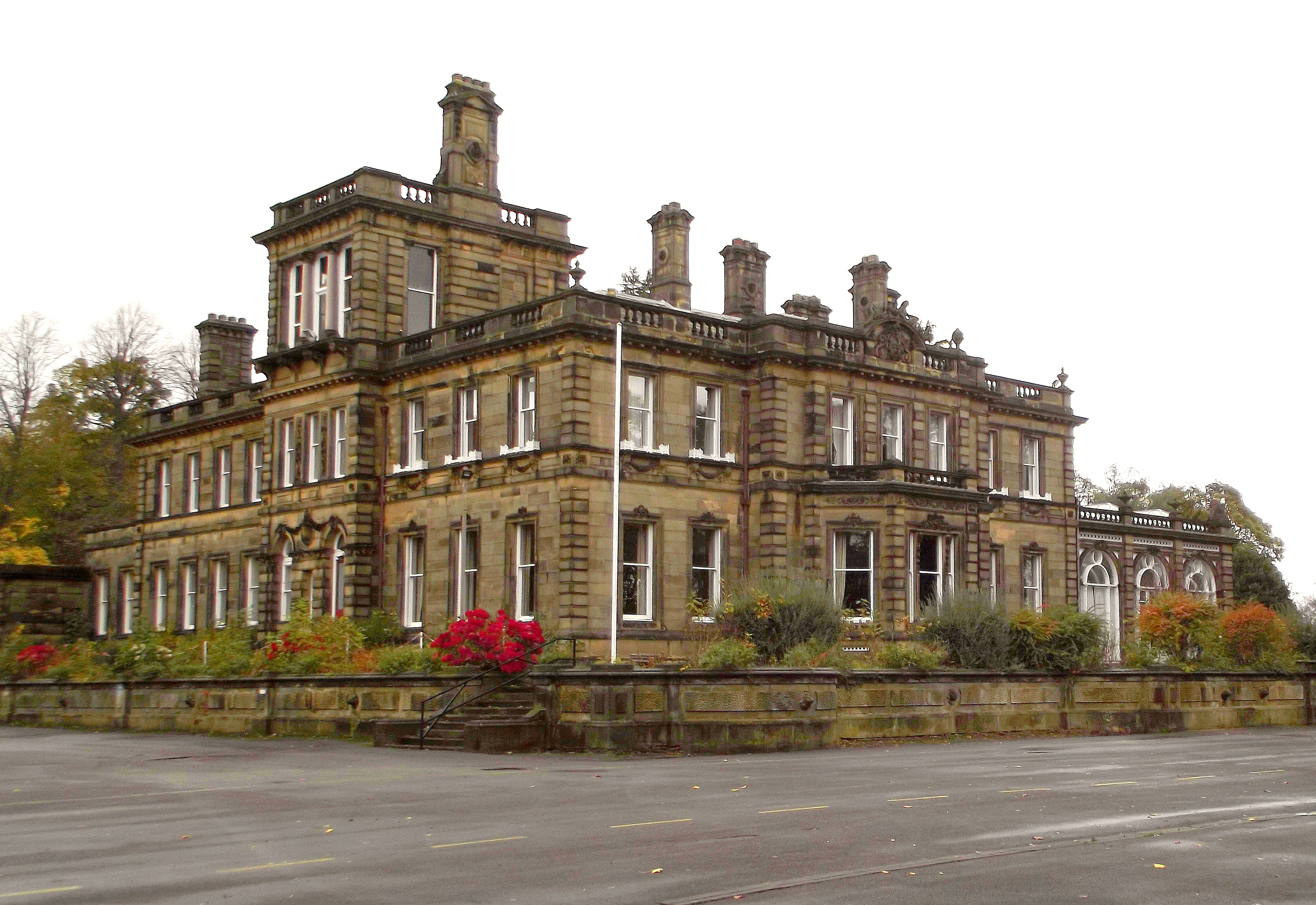
Endcliffe Hall

The present hall was built between the years of 1863 and 1865 by the Sheffield architects Flockton & Abbot for the Sheffield industrialist John Brown. Brown had acquired considerable wealth and prestige from the manufacture of armour plate from Bessemer steel at his Atlas Works in the city and wanted to build a private residence to reflect his position as one of the nouveau riche industrialists of the Victorian Age. It is the largest private residence ever to have been built in Sheffield.

== History ==
The Endcliffe estate can be traced back to 1333 when John de Elcliffe was awarded a financial grant, at that time the estate extended considerably and took in land between the Porter and Sheaf valleys. It is believed that the first Endcliffe Hall was built in the reign of George II (1727 - 1760) although Sheffield historian J. Edward Vickers says there may have been an earlier building on the site. The hall was owned from 1818 by the merchant William Hodgson and included 50 acres (200,000 m^{2}) of land and cost £6,700. The hall later passed to Henry Wilkinson, a Sheffield silversmith before being bought by John Brown in August 1860.

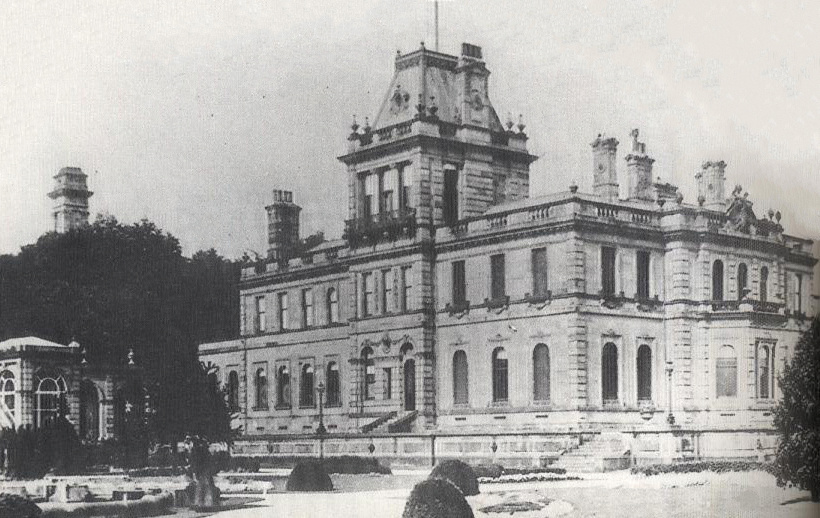
The hall seen shortly after its construction in the 1860s.

Brown had previously lived at the large seven bedroomed house of Shirle Hill in Cherry Tree Road, Nether Edge. However Brown was looking for a more impressive structure to entertain his visitors and wanted a building that was “…. specially adapted for dispensing hospitalities on a scale worthy of such distinguished visitors". Brown's first action on acquiring the building was to pull the old hall down and replace it with the current building which cost £100,000 to build with a further £60,000 spent on the furnishings. Brown was determined to use Sheffield craftsmen during the work on the hall and in addition to the architects Flockton & Abbot he employed local firms such as John Jebson Smith (staircases), Longden & Co. (kitchen stoves), Messrs Craven (ornamental plasterwork), William Gibson (carpentry), Mr Pitt (plumbing and glazing) and John and Joseph Rogers (decorating).

Such was the rarity of such a fine building being erected in Sheffield at that time, that when the hall was finished it was opened to the public for three days attracting huge crowds and much praise with the Sheffield Telegraph calling it, "the public advantage of personal munificence" in its edition of 24 May 1865. After the death of his wife in 1881, Brown gradually withdrew from public life, his health deteriorated and he spent increasing amounts of time in southern England. John Brown left Endcliffe Hall for the last time in 1892 and sold Endcliffe Hall for £26,000 in 1895 (a year before his death) to Barber Brothers and Wortley for building development. The development never took place and various plans were proposed for the future of the hall.

In 1913 the hall was in danger of demolition, then Colonel George Ernest Branson of the 4th Hallamshire Battalion suggested that the hall could replace the Hyde Park Barracks as the headquarters of the Battalion. The plan was endorsed by the War Office in January 1914 and the house was sold to the Reserve Forces and Cadets Association for use by the Territorial Army and became the Hallamshire's headquarters. Before the Battalion moved in, a number of alterations were needed these included converting the stables and coach house into a drill hall. Endcliffe Hall remained the HQ of the Hallamshires until 1968 when the battalion was disbanded. Today the hall and grounds are still owned by the RFCA and is the former Regimental Headquarters of Army Reserve unit 212 (Yorkshire) Field Hospital. Access to the grounds is limited for the general public as the military are on a constant terrorist security alert.

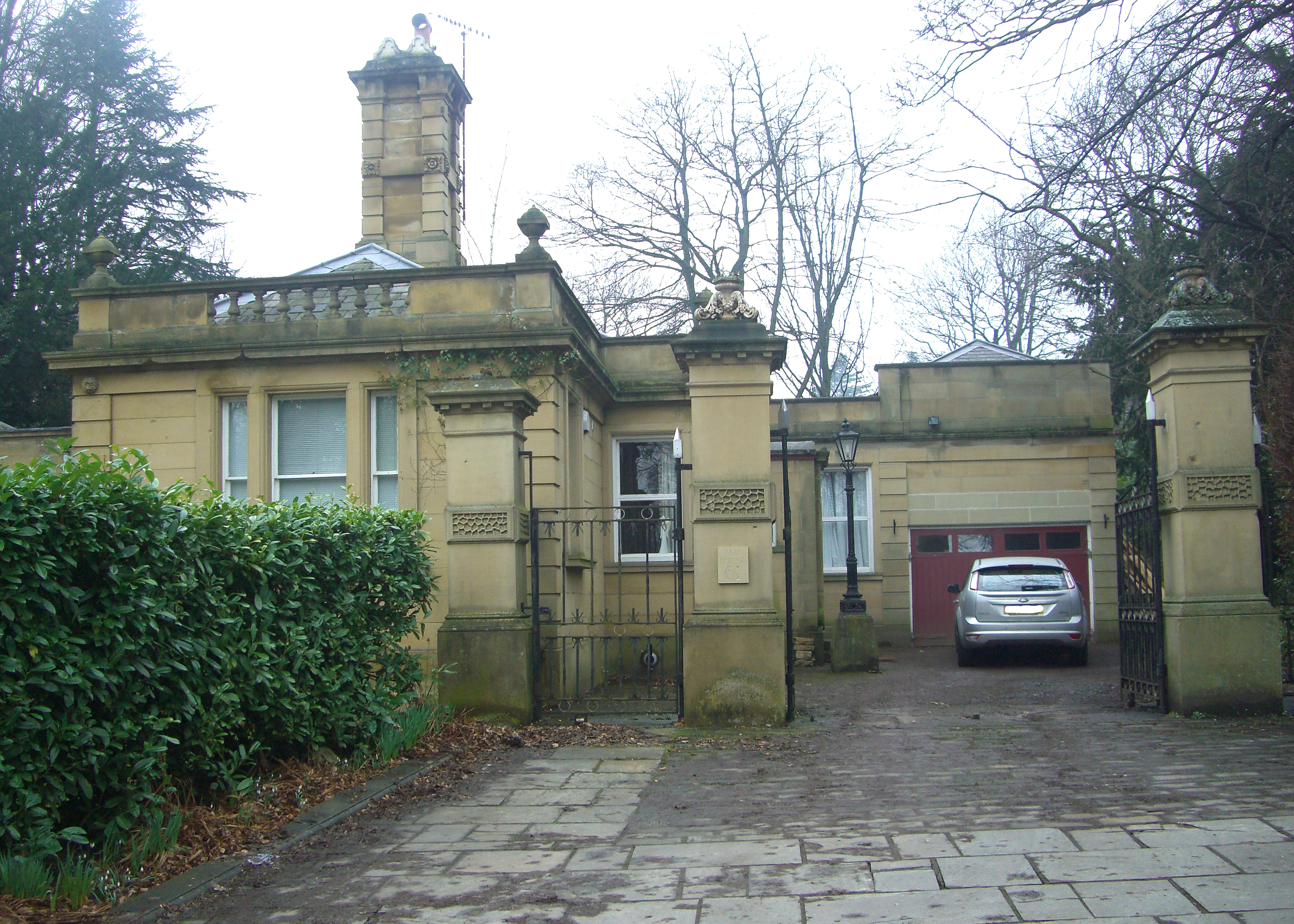
The lodge and gate piers.

== Architecture ==
Endcliffe Hall is built in the Italianate style from ashlar stonework and has a hipped slate roof. There are two storeys with plain sash windows, the main front of the building, which faces west, has a three-storey square Belvedere tower. The hall was designed to be fireproof with concrete floors and iron joists with a large cistern in the tower for domestic use and fire fighting. The ground floor windows were made burglar proof with the use of retractable Belgian made louvred iron shutters. Large mirrors masked the shutters on the interior when closed and threw light back into the room. The architectural sculpture was executed by Mawer and Ingle. The former entrance and lodge stand at the south east corner of the grounds; they have been converted into a private house and named 61 Endcliffe Vale Road.

== Interior ==
The interior has preserved much of its abundant decorations over the years. The largest room in the house is the 60 ft (18 m) by 30 ft (9.1 m) saloon which housed John Brown's art collection and also had an organ at one end. The most important rooms at Endcliffe face south and west to take advantage of the view and the sun. Upstairs there are nine bedrooms including the 22 ft (6.7 m) by 19 ft (5.8 m) State bedroom with a walnut and gilt four poster bed.
