= John Brown (industrialist) =

British industrialist; (1816–1896)

Sir John Brown
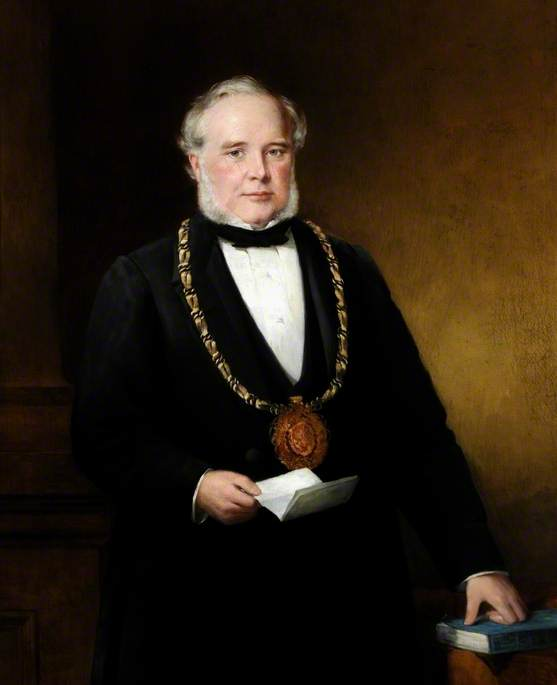
- Sir John Brown with Mayor's Chain. Portrait in Sheffield Town Hall
- Born: 6 December 1816; Sheffield
- Died: 27 December 1896 (aged 80); Bromley
- Occupation: industrialist

Sir John Brown (6 December 1816 – 27 December 1896), British industrialist, was born in Sheffield. He was known as the Father of the South Yorkshire Iron Trade.

== Background ==
He was born at Sheffield in Flavell's Yard, Fargate, on 6 December 1816. He was the second son of Samuel Brown, a slater of that town. He was educated at a local school held in a garret, and was apprenticed at the age of fourteen to Earl, Horton, & Co., factors, of Orchard Place, In 1831, his employers engaged in the manufacture of files and table cutlery, taking an establishment in Rockingham Street, which they styled the Hallamshire Works. Nonetheless he did take over the company's factoring business with the help of a loan for £500 thanks to the backing of his father and uncle and for several years travelled the country selling goods. In 1839, he married Mary (b. 1813 – died 28 November 1881), eldest daughter of Benjamin Scholefield of Sheffield. Brown lived with his wife throughout much of his working career at Shirle Hill in Sheffield. He died without issue at Shortlands, the house of Mr. Barron, Bromley in Kent, on 27 December 1896, and was buried at Ecclesall on 31 December.

== Career ==
He started his own company John Brown & Company in 1844 manufacturing steel at a small foundry on a site at what is the now Orchard Square Shopping centre. The business prospered so well that he sold his factoring firm and moved to larger premises on Furnival Street.

=== Invention of volute spring buffer ===
In 1848 Brown invented the conical steel spring buffer for railway carriages which he sold to the London and North Western Railway as well as other railways throughout the UK.

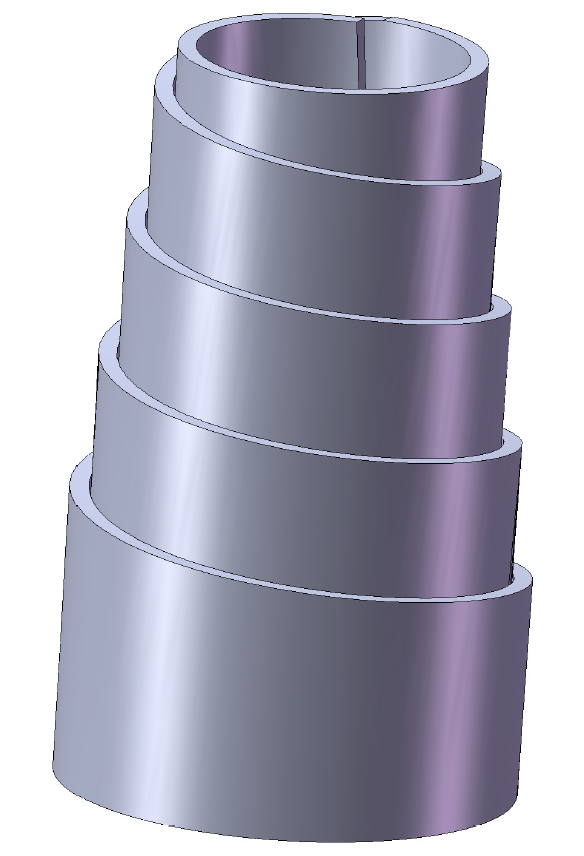
Conical, or volute spring

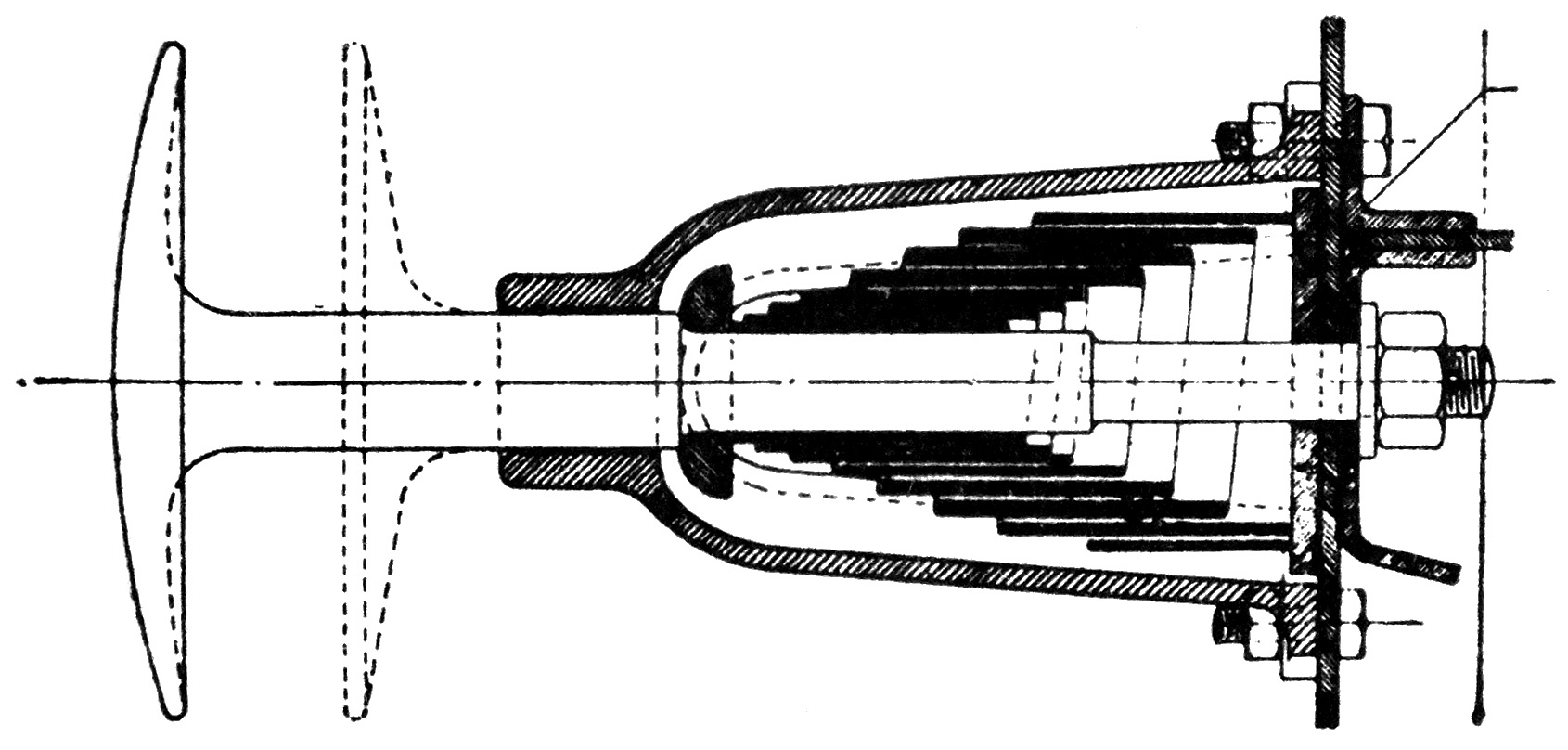
Diagram showing volute spring within buffer assembly

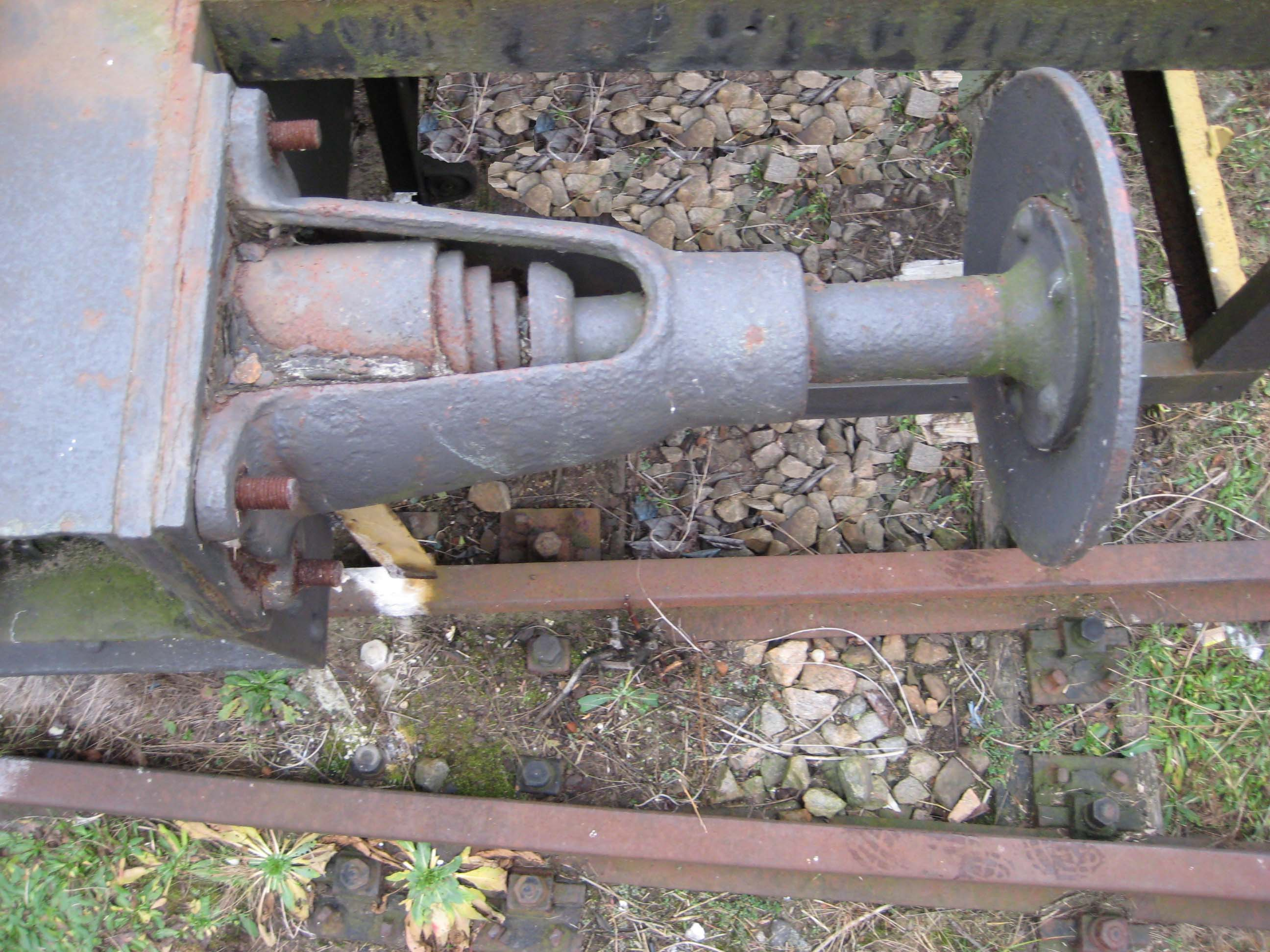
Volute spring within buffer assembly on coach

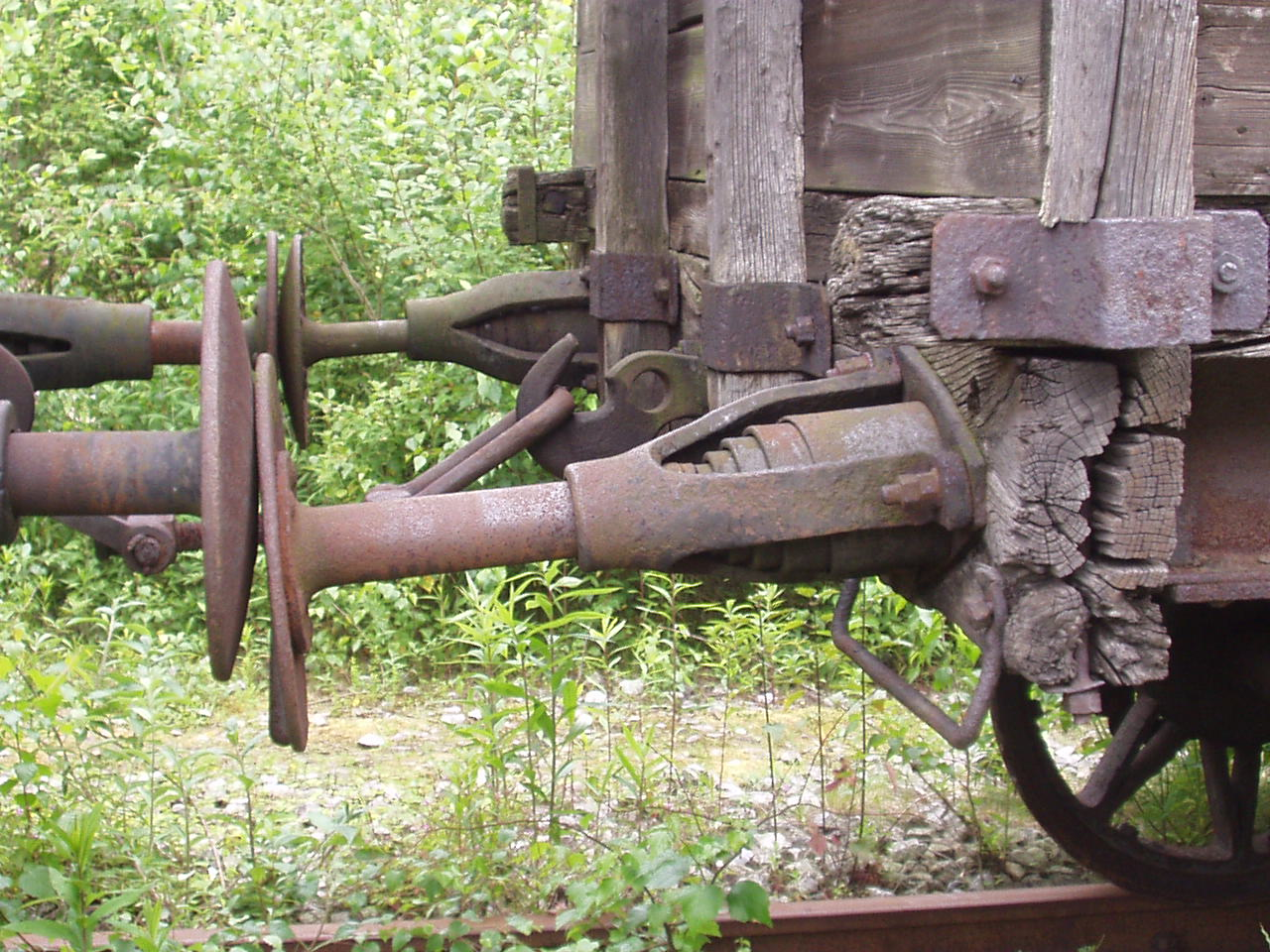
Volute spring within buffer assembly on coach

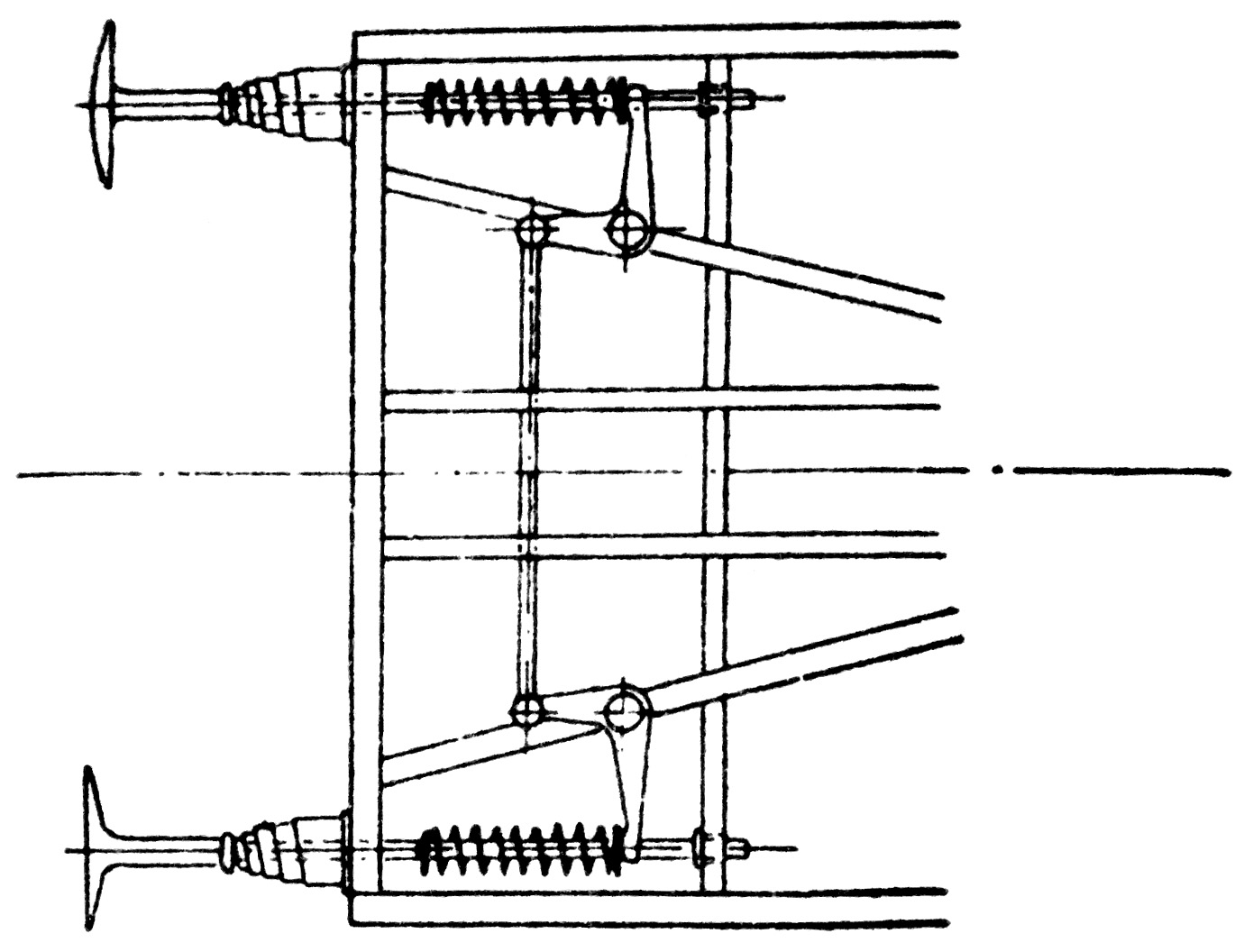
Diagram showing volute spring within buffer assembly on coach chassis

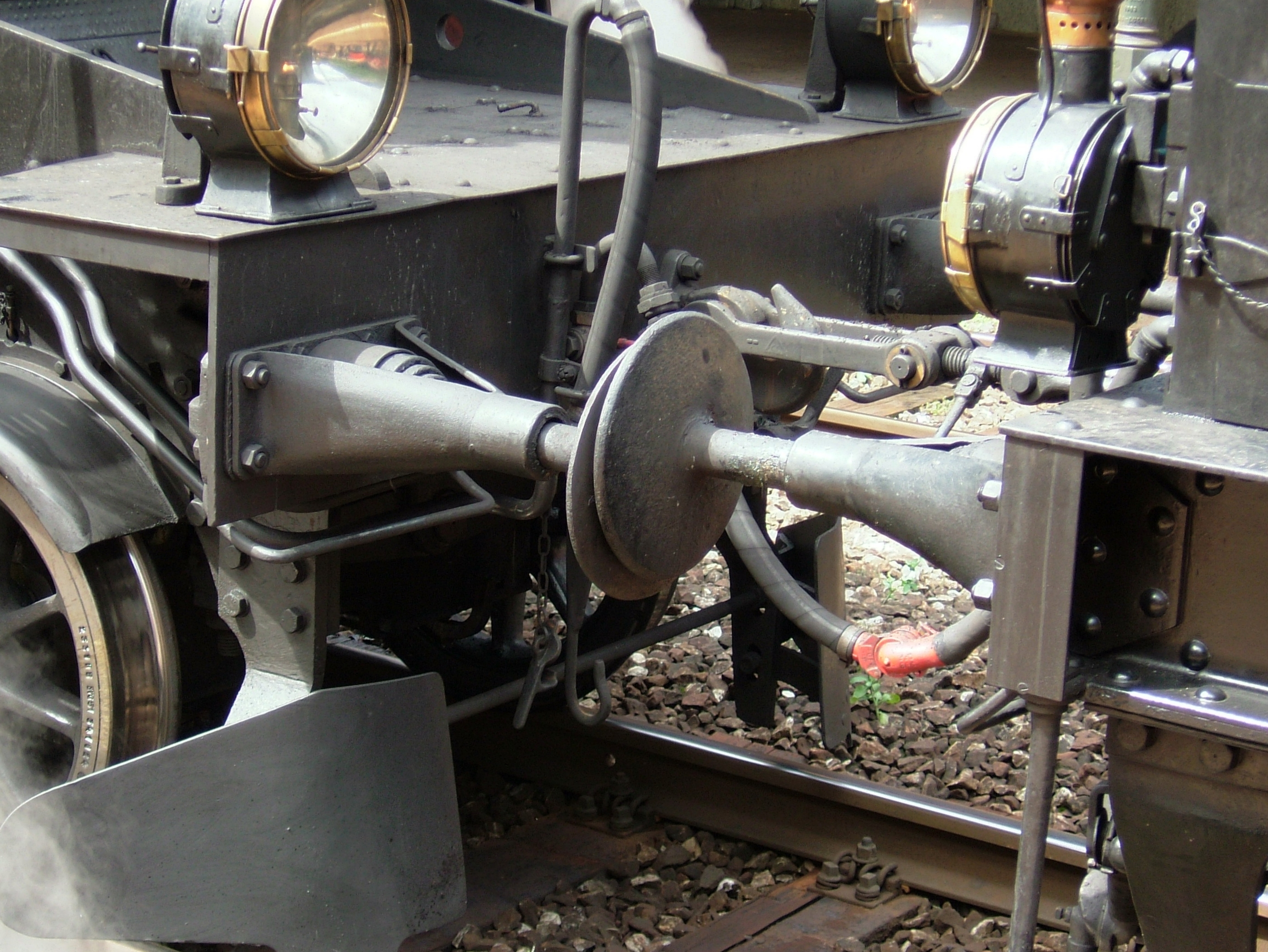
Volute spring within buffer on a locomotive

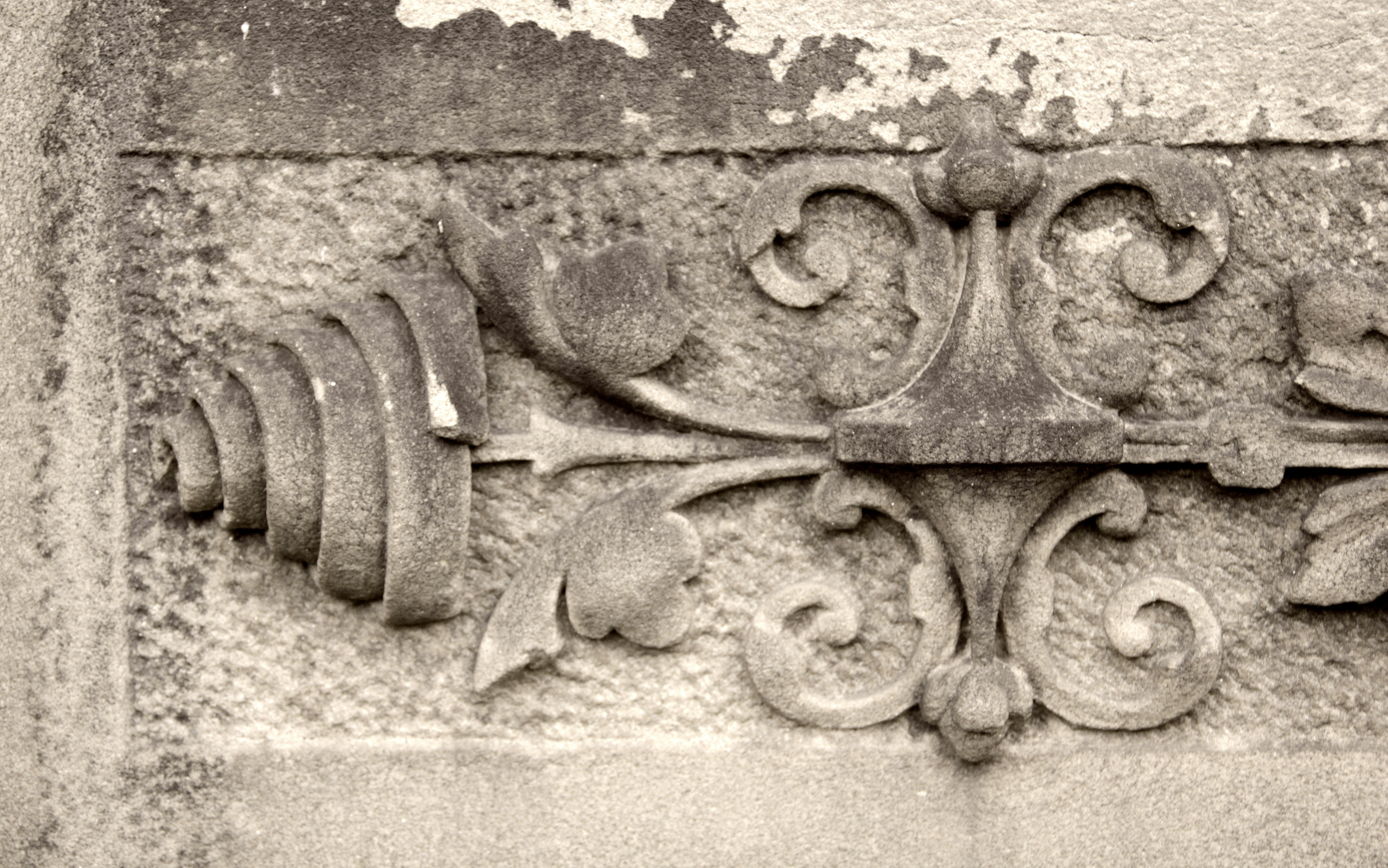
Carving of volute spring on John Brown's house, Endcliffe Hall

=== Atlas Works ===
On 1 January 1856, Brown opened his new Atlas Works in Brightside in an effort to centralise his workshops and workforce in one place, the works originally were on a 3-acre (1.2 ha) site but within three years had grown to 30 acres (12 ha). By 1859 Brown was producing rails for the quickly expanding railway industry using the Bessemer process.

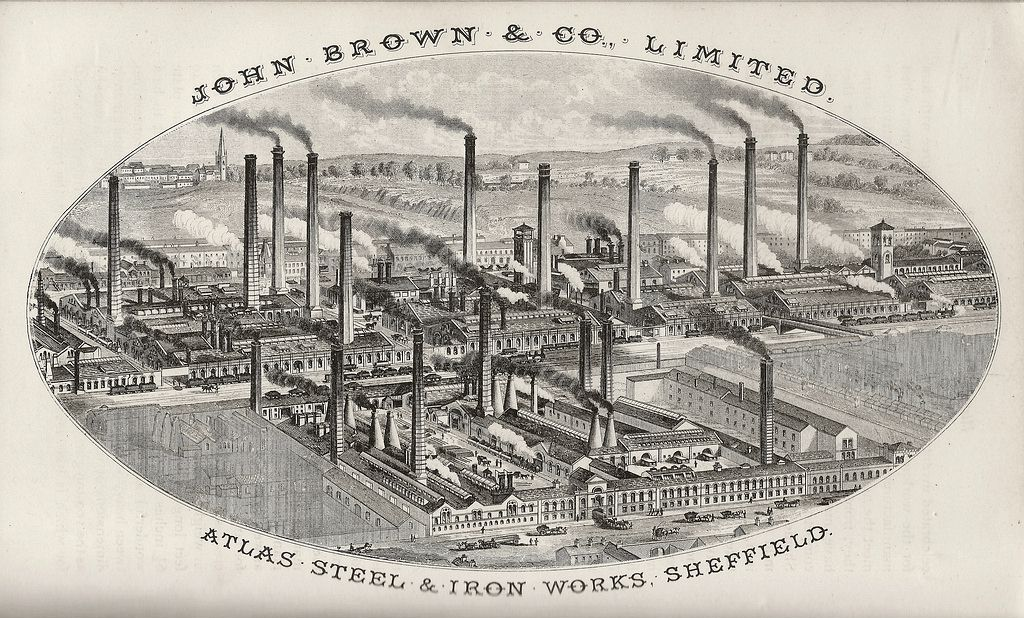
Atlas Steel and Ironworks

Brown's great achievement was the development of armour plating for war vessels. In 1860, he saw at Toulon the French ship La Gloire. She was a timber-built 90-gun three-decker, cut down and coated with hammered plate armour, four and a half inches thick. This contrivance occasioned the British government so much uneasiness that they ordered ten 90- and 100-gun vessels to be similarly adapted. Brown, from a distant inspection of La Gloire, came to the conclusion that the armoured plates used in protecting her might have been rolled instead of hammered. He was at that time mayor of Sheffield, and he invited the premier, Lord Palmerston, to inspect the process. Palmerston's visit was followed in April 1863 by one from the lords of the admiralty, who saw a plate rolled to twelve inches thick and fifteen to twenty feet long. The latter visit was the subject of an article in Punch (18 April 1863). The admiralty were convinced of the merits of Brown's methods, and the royal commission on armour plates ordered from his works nearly all the plates they required. In a few years, he had sheathed fully three-fourths of the British navy.

In 1856, he concentrated in Savile Street, Sheffield, the different manufactures in which he had been engaged in various parts of the town. His establishment, styled the Atlas Works, covered nearly thirty acres, and increased until it gave employment to over four thousand artisans. He undertook the manufacture of armour plates, ordnance forgings, railway bars, steel springs, buffers, tires, and axles, supplied Sheffield with iron for steel-making purposes, and was the first successfully to develop the Bessemer process, and to introduce into Sheffield the manufacture of steel rails. He received frequent applications from foreign governments for armour plates, but invariably declined such contracts unless the consent of the home government was obtained. During the civil war in America he refused large orders from the northern states.

=== Retirement ===
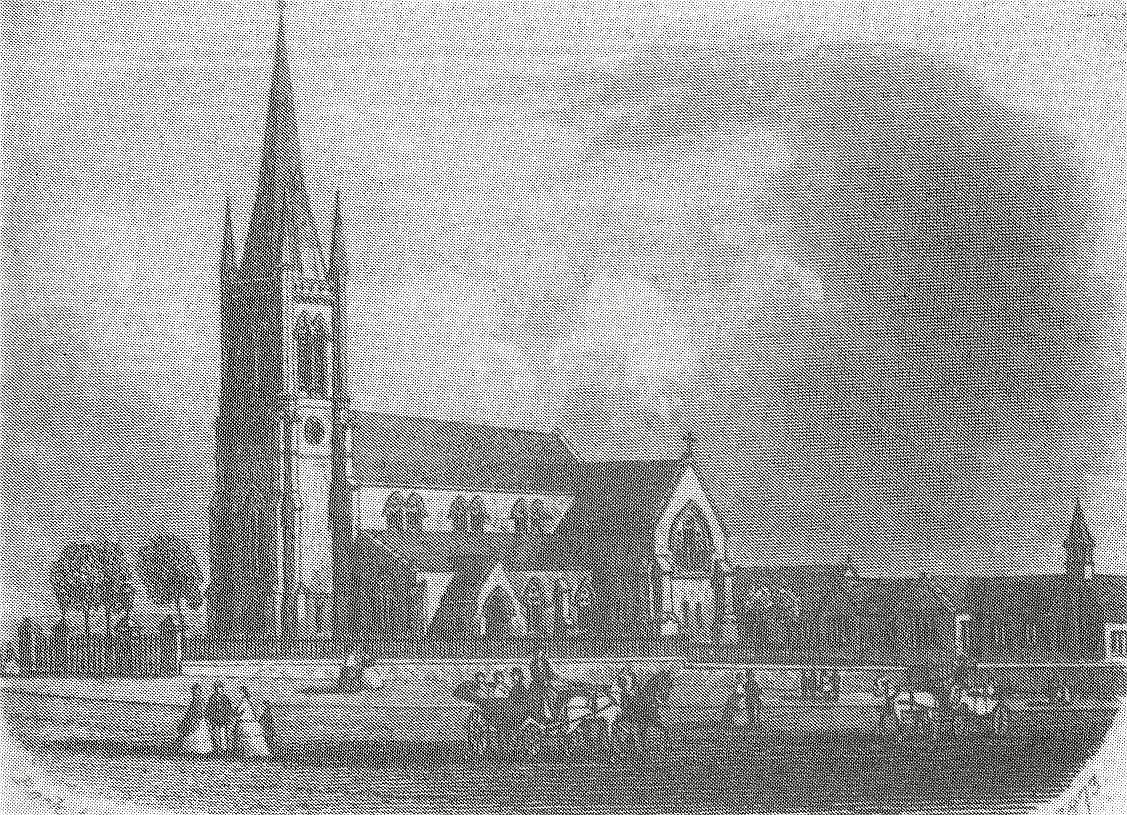
All Saints, Brightside, Sheffield

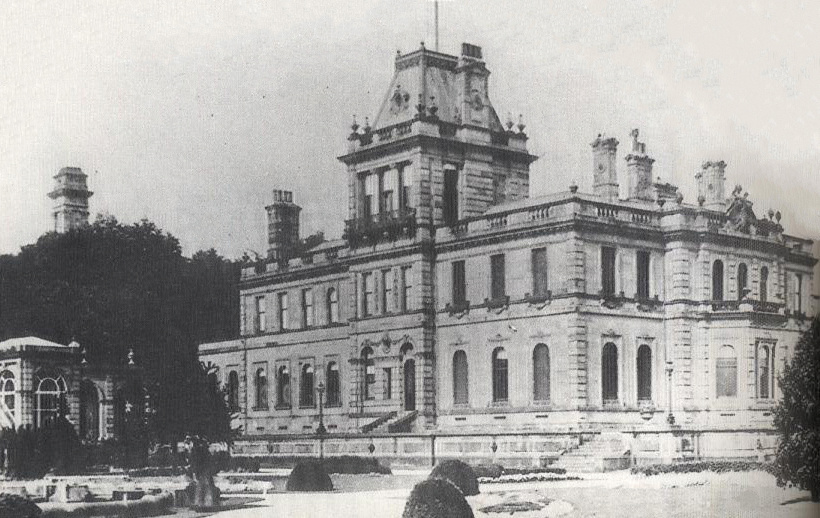
Endcliffe Hall in 1865

In 1864, his business was converted into a limited liability company, and he retired to Endfield Hall, Ranmoor, near Sheffield. He was Mayor of Sheffield in 1862 and 1863, and master cutler in 1865 and 1866, and was knighted in 1867. In 1865 he had Endcliffe Hall built as his private residence, this was and still is the largest private house ever built in Sheffield. Between 1866 and 1869, he funded the building of All Saints Church, Brightside, Sheffield, designed by Flockton and Abbott to accommodate the increasing numbers of employees at Atlas Ironworks. All Saints was demolished in 1977 and replaced by St Peter's in 1980.

== Merger ==
In 1902, Sheffield steelmakers John Brown & Company exchanged shares and came to a working agreement with neighbouring company Thomas Firth & Sons, the companies continuing under their own management until they finally merged in 1930 Forming Firth Brown Ltd.

== Personal life ==
Brown married Mary Schofield, daughter of Benjamin Schofield in 1839. Mary's sister Louisa was married to Rowland Staniforth, son of Thomas Staniforth of Thomas Staniforth & Co.

== See also ==
- John Brown & Company – In 1899, the company John Brown created purchased a shipyard on the River Clyde, and went on to become one of the most famous shipbuilders of the 20th century.
