= London & Associated Properties =

Property Corporation

- Company type: Public
- Traded as: LSE: LAS
- Industry: Property investment
- Headquarters: London, W1; United Kingdom
- Key people: Sir Michael Heller (Chairman)
- Website: lap.co.uk

London & Associated Properties is a property corporation listed on the London Stock Exchange. It owns 42% of Bisichi Mining.

== Operations ==
- King Edward Court, Windsor, Berkshire
- Kings Square, West Bromwich
- Market Row, Brixton, London
- Orchard Square, Sheffield
