= William Herbert Hatfield =

William Herbert Hatfield (10 April 1882 – 16 October 1943) was an English metallurgist who contributed to the development of stainless steel.

== Early life ==
Hatfield was born in Sheffield on 10 April 1882 and studied metallurgy at University College, Sheffield, being awarded the Mappin Medal in 1902. In 1907 he married Edith Seagrave. In 1913 his research resulted in the award of the degree of Doctor of Metallurgy.

== Career ==
Hatfield was appointed Director of the Brown - Firth Research Laboratories in Sheffield in 1916 (succeeding Harry Brearley and continuing Brearley's work on stainless steel), and later joined the Board of Messrs Thomas Firth and John Brown Limited.

Hatfield is credited with the invention in 1924 of 18/8 stainless steel (18% chromium, 8% nickel); he also invented 18/8 stainless with titanium added, now known as 321.

In 1940 he devised "Rex 78", a stainless steel alloy for use in Frank Whittle's turbojet engine project, the material being first used in the Power Jets W.1.

He authored a variety of technical papers on metallurgy, with particular reference to rust, acid and heat-resistant steels and cast iron.

There is an Annual memorial lecture held in December each year at Sheffield University, called the "Hatfield Memorial Lecture" funded by a Trust set up in 1944. The lecture subject is related to metallurgy.
