= Portland Works =

Cutlery works in Sheffield, England

Coordinates: 53.36996°N 1.47410°W

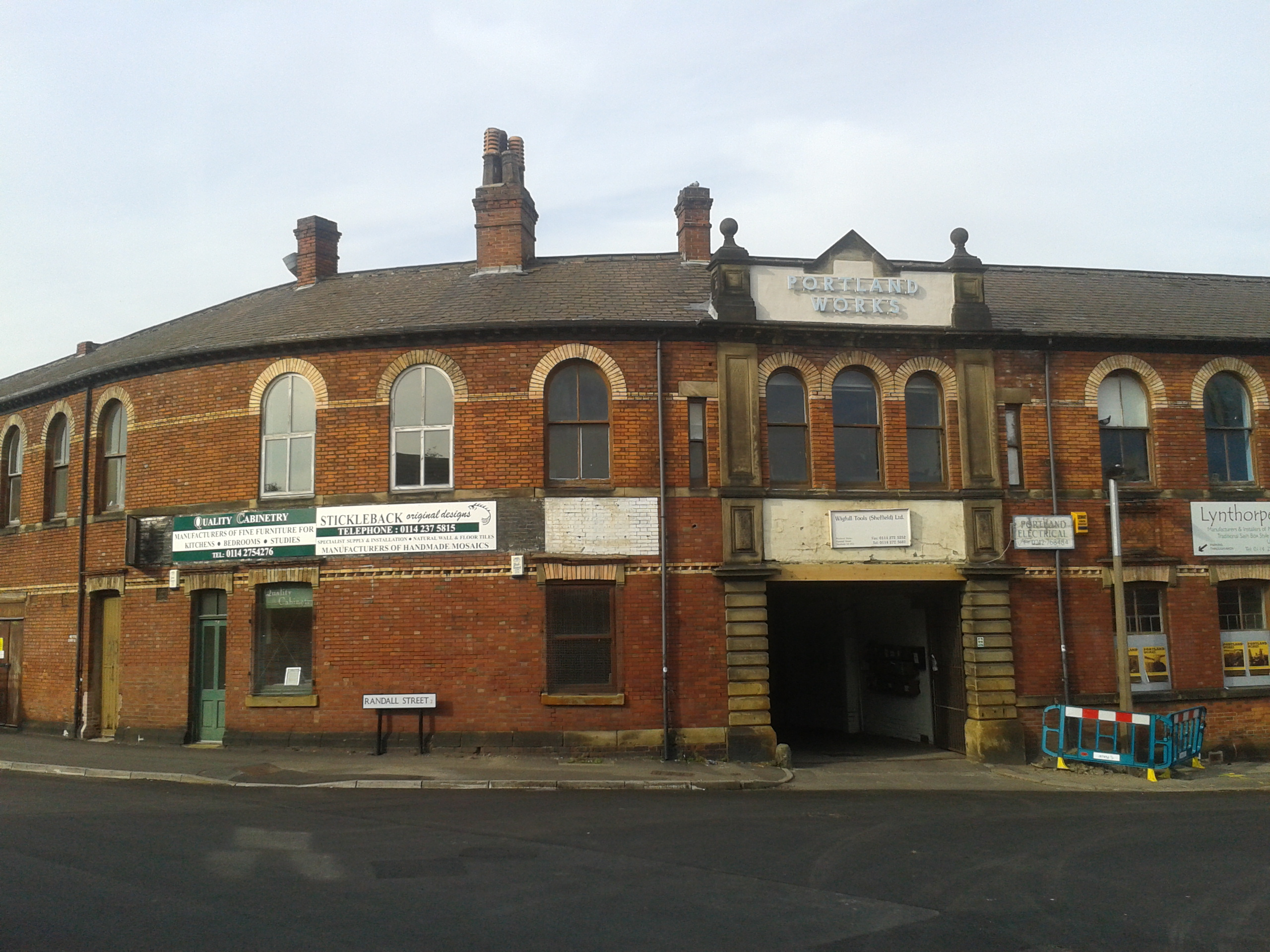
Part of Portland Works

Portland Works is a former cutlery works in the Highfield area of Sheffield in England. Built in 1877, it is now a Grade II* listed building and one of the last remaining working examples of a purpose built metal trades factory. In early 2013, it was bought by nearly five hundred people, through one of the country's largest community share issues. Today Portland Works operates a collection of workspaces for traditional and modern craftspeople and is home to more than 30 small businesses.

== History ==
The building, designed by architect JH Jenkinson was constructed in the late 1870s as a cutlery works. Three two- and three-storey ranges of brick-built workshops, offices and showrooms lie around a courtyard containing an octagonal chimney and some more recent structures. The central part of the rear range of workshops was reduced from three to two stories, following a fire. It was occupied for many years by R. F. Mosley, before being split into separate workshops. When first constructed, it was partially mechanised. When surveyed by English Heritage in 1995, it still retained hand forges and a steam-grinding room.

In 1914, through a collaboration between Harry Brearley, Ernest Stuart and R. F. Mosley at Portland Works, this became the first place in the world to manufacture stainless steel cutlery and this remains, to this day, one of the site's many activities. The city of Sheffield in itself is strongly associated with its steel industry heritage not least in sporting world, with the ice hockey team known as the Sheffield Steelers and one of the local football teams, Sheffield United being nicknamed 'The Blades'. Bramall Lane, Sheffield United's football ground, is within walking distance of Portland Works.

== Tenants ==
Portland Works exists as a centre for small manufacturing, independent artists and craftspeople. In November 2020, more than 30 small businesses were located within the 2600 square metre floor space. These include knife makers, engravers and engineers; cabinetmakers and joiners; jewellers and silver platers; artists; guitar makers; photographers and a Yorkshire based gin distillery.

== Music and art ==
=== Musicians ===
Portland Works has been associated with the music and art scene for a number of years. Bands such as Kimmy Yeah, Dosch and Big Eyes Family Players use Portland Works to practise, and there are studio facilities for use by other bands. Def Leppard used the works for early band rehearsals.

=== Artists ===
As well as musicians, a number of artists make use of the space at Portland Works, including Mary Sewell and Linda Doughty. One of the most notable pieces of artwork created by any of the artists in Portland Works is that depicting the ghost of Portland Works (a painting by Mary Sewell).

In Spring 2019, Portland Works was the subject for a new painting by British artist, Joe Scarborough. Titled "Life in the Big Village", the painting depicted a cutaway view of Portland Works set within a wider Sheffield city backdrop. A limited edition series of prints was subsequently made available for purchase

=== Theatre ===
In July 2020, Portland Works formed a partnership with Only Lucky Dogs Theatre Ltd to produce new, original theatre performances in the building's recently renovated "Makerspace".

== Campaign ==
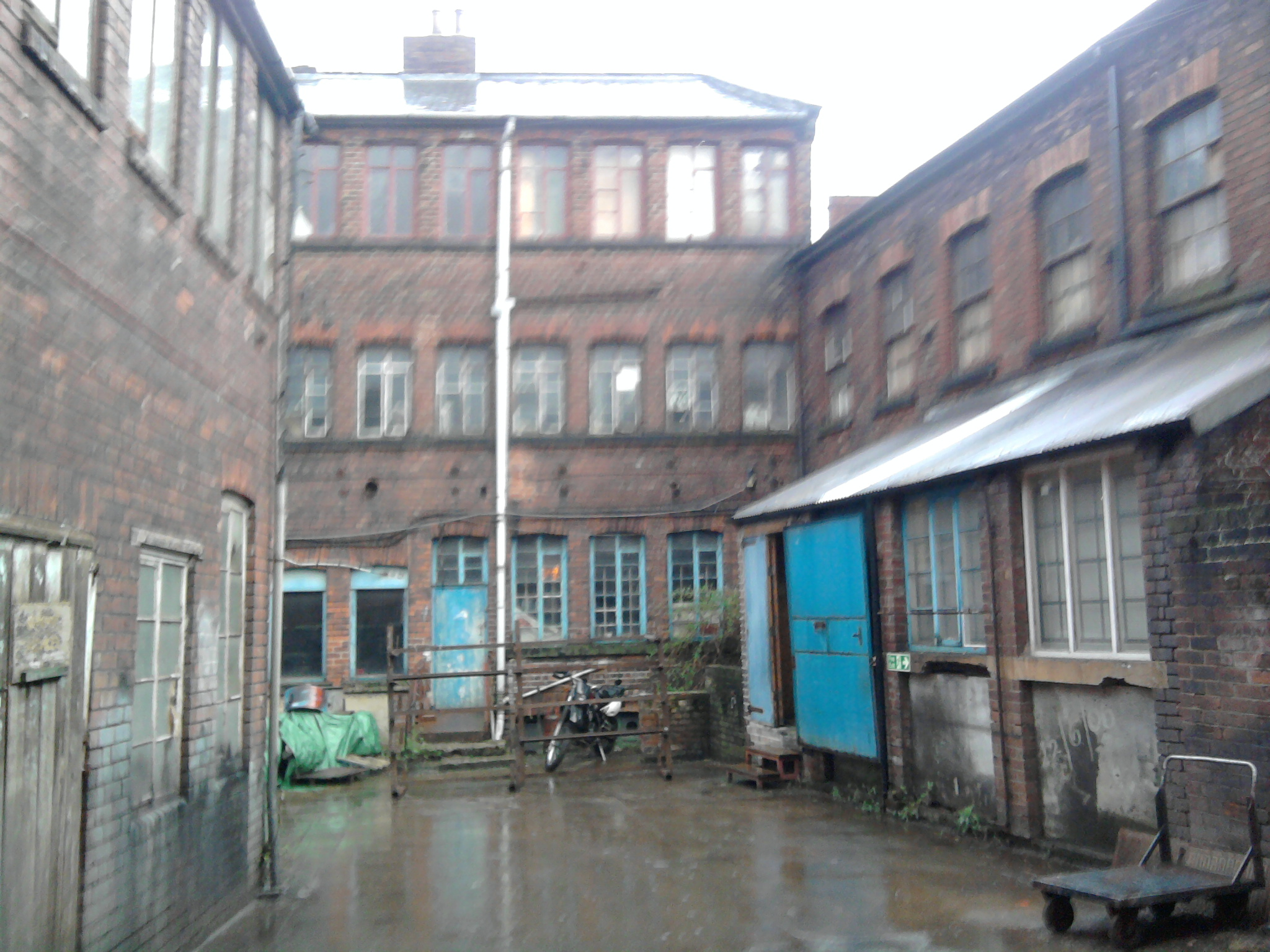
A view inside Portland Works

Portland Works is one of very few Sheffield metal trades buildings to have a continuous history of manufacturing since its construction, in 1877. For many years it was the home of R. F. Mosley's cutlery business. In 2009, a planning application was submitted for Portland Works to be converted into residential flats. As a result of this, concerned tenants and supporters set up a campaign to save Portland Works and offer an alternative future based on the existing mix of tenants. The 'Save Portland Works' campaign group became a Community Benefit Society in 2011, operating on co-operative principles. The Portland Works website outlines the campaign, through which almost £500,000 was eventually raised, with help from the Architectural Heritage Fund website to buy the works outright in early 2013.

The building is now community owned and operated by over 500 shareholders through one of the largest community benefit societies in the UK. Since 2013 a group of volunteers have been renovating the building, working to preserve as much of the original fabric as possible. By late 2017 about 25% of the Works had been so restored. The volunteers have focussed on retaining as much of the original fabric as possible, leading to extensive work being done to retain original pitch-pine window frames, hand forging replacement window catches and pointing the brickwork with lime mortars. Interiors are being done equally sensitively whilst attempting to provide some degree of modern comforts, such as roof insulation, good lighting and fire alarms. Meanwhile much work is being done in 2018 on restoring many of the complex roofs, funded by an HLF grant.

A shared meeting space has been created from two street-side workshops, for community and educational use, and a small museum has been built in an adjacent room, celebrating the Mosley family cutlery business and the people who worked there.

"Robert Fead Mosley" by Anna de Lange (published 2013) outlines the history of the works.
