= Brenton See =

Australian artist (born 1986)

- Born: 1985 or 1986 (age 39–40)
- Occupation: Muralist
- Website: www.brentonsee.com.au

Brenton See (born 1985/1986) is an Australian artist, known for painting murals, especially of birds.

See, whose mother is also an artist, studied graphic design at a technical and further education college and undertook an apprenticeship as a tattoo artist.

Locations for his murals include Perth Zoo.

See, a resident of the Fremantle suburb Hilton, has written on his website:

Ever since I was a child I have been fascinated by creatures big and small... An interest in birds came in my early teens... My mother, an amazing craft person herself had always been a massive influence on my creativity and pushed me to start creating my own works.

== Works ==
See's public murals include:

- 2014: Exterior and interior painted wall murals, Little Wing Corner Gallery, Subiaco, Perth WA
- 2014: Interior painted wooden mural, Ball & Chain Bar, Fremantle, Perth WA
- 2015: Exterior wall Fresh Provisions car park Mt Lawley, Perth WA
- 2015: Interior mural Waldecks garden Centre Stirling, Perth WA
- 2015: Exterior mural Woolworths Fremantle, Perth WA
- 2015: Exterior and interior murals St Patricks Primary school Fremantle, Perth WA
- 2015: Exterior and Interior murals Our Lady of Mt Carmel School Hilton, Perth WA
- 2015: Pash Frozen yogurt exterior portable mural Fremantle WA
- 2015: Sea Shepherd action mural, Fremantle WA
- 2016: Exterior wall mural Flying Scottsman carpark Mt Lawley, Perth WA
- 2016: Exterior wall mural Rosemount Hotel Carpark, Perth WA
- 2016: Telstra Exchange building exterior mural, Perth WA
- 2016: Highgate Primary School exterior mural, Highgate Perth WA
- 2016: Mt Hawthorn Festival exterior mural, Mt Hawthorn Perth WA
- 2016: Esplanade Hotel Fremantle interior mural, Fremantle WA
- 2016: Caffe Amaretto carpark exterior mural
- 2016: Ashfield Primary School exterior mural, Ashfield WA
- 2016: Live canvas Painting, State Theatre Perth WA
- 2016: Dampier mural project (three exterior murals). Dampier WA
- 2016: Exterior wall mural for Infill property group. Hamilton Hill WA
- 2016: The Chippery & Co exterior mural, Norhbridge WA
- 2016: Wembley Downs Primary School. Three exterior murals, Wembley Downs WA
- 2016: St Patricks Primary School. Exterior mural. Fremantle WA
- 2016: Hongkies Hong Kong Kitchen restaurant, Northbridge WA
- 2016: Subiaco Vet exterior mural, Subiaco WA
- 2016: Mulberry Tree childcare external mural, North Perth WA
- 2017: Mulberry Tree childcare exterior mural, Tuart Hill WA
- 2017: Kerry Street Pear Tree coffee shop exterior mural, Hamilton Hill WA
- 2017: Mulberry Tree Childcare, Tuart Hill WA
- 2017: Lions Park exterior mural x2, Dampier WA
- 2017: Exterior murals for MSC.org, opposite Joes Fish Shack, Fremantle WA
- 2017: Exterior mural for Heartwalk, Kalgoorlie WA
- 2017: Interior mural Kolbe Catholic College, Rockingham WA
- 2017: Exterior mural Maida Vale Primary School, Maida Vale WA
- 2017: Interior mural Screenwest department ABC Perth, Perth WA
- 2017: Exterior mural Piney Lakes Sensory Playground, Winthrop WA
- 2018: Wheat silos in Newdegate, Western Australia
- 2018: Lions shed in Cowaramup, Western Australia

== See also ==
- Sarah Yates, aka Faunagraphic, a similar artist, working in Sheffield, England
