= Sarah Yates =

British painter

- Other name: Faunagraphic
- Occupations: Artist; Muralist
- Website: www.faunagraphic.com

Sarah Yates (born 1987 Blackburn, England) working under the name Faunagraphic, is a British artist, known for painting murals, especially of birds. She also paints on canvas.

From the age of 16, Yates studied graphic design at college. She has worked in Belgium, Bulgaria, Cyprus, France, Germany, Greece, Romania, and the United States, and has been featured on the BBC programmes Springwatch and Countryfile.

Her commissions include a 42 feet (13 m) mural of Harry Brearley, on Howard Street, Sheffield, to mark the 100th anniversary of his invention of stainless steel.

MURAL FESTIVAL EVENT LIST

Derbyshire wildlife Trust, Wild About Derby Event, The Museum of making Derby - 2022 - Painted (2 large Peregrine Falcons)

Rise Up Residency, Margate, UK 2022 - Painted - (Large Heron)

Heart of Glass - Parr St Helens 2022 - Painted - (Woodpecker amongst Nature and Glass orb)

Possibilities, Heywood Manchester UK 2021 - Painted - (Firecrest and Goldfinch)

Gravity Festival - Paris - Notorious brand France 2021 - Painted (Great Tit & Painted Lady Butterfly)

London Mural Festival, Walthamstow 2021 - Painted (Kestrel and magnolia Flowers)

BBC Countryfile mural 2020

Culpeer for Change Mural - Plovdiv 2019

Cheltenham Mural Festival 2019

GARGAR Festival Penelles Catalonia - 2019 - Painted (Eagle on collaboration wall with Rocket01)

Habitat - GRAFFPOST - Mural Project - Sofia Bulgaria 2019

Woodside Festival - Derbyshire Wildlife Trust 2018

Graffpost Mural project - Sofia Bulgaria 2018

Camden London - 2017

Fun City - Varna Bulgaria - 2017

We All Write Festival - Ahtopol Bulgaria 2017

Feature Walls - Sheffield UK 2016

Blackburn Openwalls UK 2016

Urban collectiors - Bucharest Romania 2016

Endangered 13 - Humannature Art - London Tower Hamlets

Waxwings - New Horizons - Stoke on Trent

My Wild - Tatton Flower Show (installation) 2015

Sand Sea Spray Blackpool 2014

Sprayport Festival - Southport 2014

Halle Germany - 2014

Private Client Projects

Knowhow Offices - Sheffield Uk 2014

== See also ==
- Brenton See, a similar artist working in Perth, Western Australia
