= Bisichi Mining =

Bisichi PLC
- Formerly: Bisichi Tin Company Public Limited Company (1910–1988); Bisichi Mining Public Limited Company (1988–2020)
- Company type: Public Limited Company
- Traded as: LSE: BISI
- Industry: Mining
- Founded: October 13, 1910; 115 years ago
- Headquarters: London, W1, United Kingdom
- Key people: Sir Michael Heller (Chairman)
- Website: bisichi.co.uk

Bisichi PLC is a mining and property corporation listed on the London Stock Exchange. It was founded in 1910. It operates the Black Wattle coal mine in Middelburg, Mpumalanga, South Africa. Its retail property investments are managed by London & Associated Properties.
