= Harry Brearley =

English metallurgist (1871–1948)

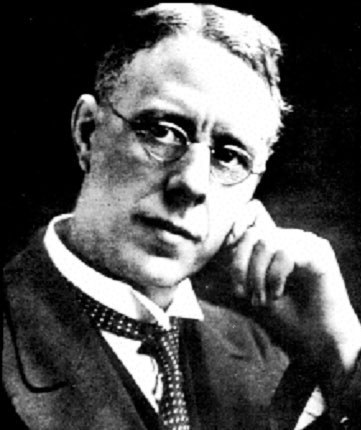
- Born: 18 February 1871; Sheffield, England
- Died: 14 July 1948 (aged 77); Torquay, Devon, England
- Occupations: Metallurgist, inventor
- Known for: The invention of stainless steel

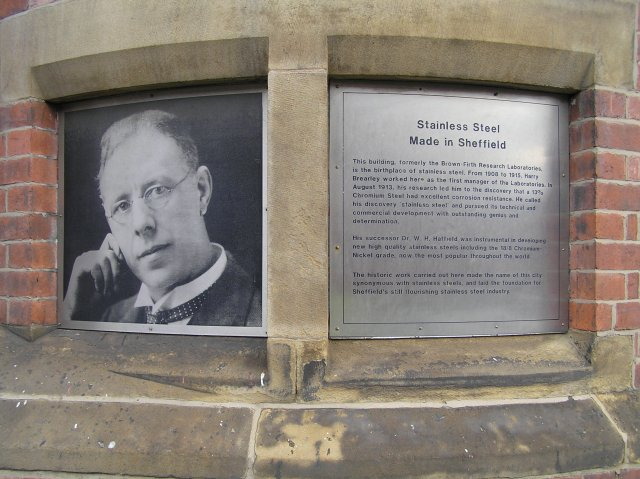
Monument to Harry Brearley at the former Brown Firth Research Laboratories in Sheffield, England

Harry Brearley (18 February 1871 – 14 July 1948) was an English metallurgist, credited with the discovery of "rustless steel" (later to be called "stainless steel"). Based in Sheffield, he enabled affordable cutlery for the masses, and an expansion of the city's traditional cutlery trade.

== Life ==
Brearley was born on 18 February 1871 in Sheffield, England, the son of John Brearley, a steelworker, and his wife, Jane Brearley (née Senior). He left Woodside school at the age of twelve to enter his first employment as a labourer in the steelworks where his father worked, later getting the post of general assistant in the company's chemical laboratory. He married Helen Theresa Crank (1874–1955) on 23 October 1895.

For several years, in addition to his laboratory work, he studied at home and later in formal evening classes, to specialize in steel production techniques and associated chemical analysis methods.

In his early thirties, Brearley had earned a reputation as an experienced professional and for being very astute in the resolution of practical, industrial, metallurgical problems. It was in 1908, when two of Sheffield's principal steelmaking companies innovatively agreed to jointly finance a common research laboratory (Brown Firth Laboratories) that Harry Brearley was asked to lead the project.

After leaving Brown Firth, Brearley joined Brown Bayley's Steel Works, also in Sheffield; he became a director of the firm in 1925.

In 1941, Brearley created a charitable trust The Freshgate Trust Foundation, a grantmaking charity operating in Sheffield and South Yorkshire. His aim was to provide a "Fresh Gate" or new opportunity to people like him born into modest circumstances so that they may experience travel, education, the arts and music. The foundation is still operating as a registered charity awarding grants for charitable purposes in South Yorkshire.

Brearley died on 14 July 1948, at Torquay. He was cremated at Efford Crematorium, Efford, near Plymouth on 16 July 1948 and his ashes were scattered in the Efford Crematorium Garden of Remembrance.

== Stainless steel ==
In the troubled years immediately before the First World War, arms manufacturing increased significantly in the UK, but practical problems were encountered due to erosion (excessive wear) of the internal surfaces of gun barrels. Brearley began to research new steels which could better resist the erosion caused by high temperatures (rather than corrosion, as is often mentioned in this regard). He began to examine the addition of chromium to steel, which was known to raise the material's melting point, as compared to the standard carbon steels.

The research concentrated on quantifying the effects of varying the levels of carbon (C, at concentrations around 0.2 weight %) and chromium (Cr, in the range of 6 to 15 weight %).

=== The accidental discovery ===
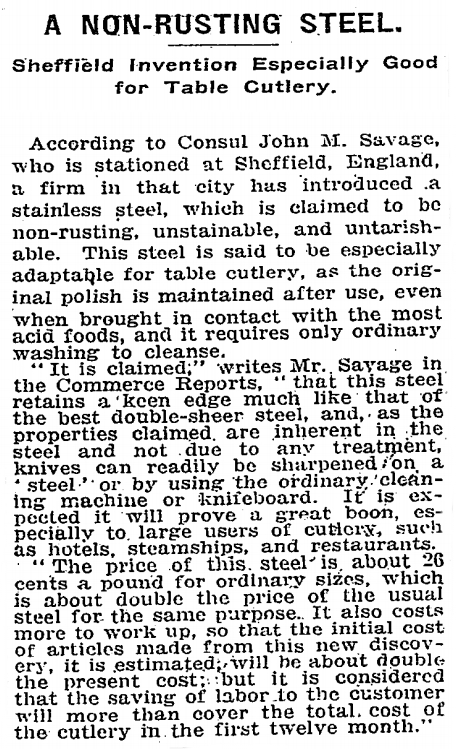
Announcement of Brearley's stainless steel discovery as it appeared in the 1915 New York Times.

In order to undertake metallography to study the microstructure of the experimental alloys (the main factor responsible for a steel's mechanical properties), it was necessary to polish and etch the metallic samples produced. For a carbon steel, a dilute solution of nitric acid in alcohol is sufficient to produce the required etching, but Brearley found that the new chromium steels were highly resistant to chemical attack.

=== Development ===
It was probably Harry Brearley's upbringing in Sheffield, a city famous for the manufacture of cutlery since the 16th century, which led him to appreciate the potential of these new steels for applications not only in high-temperature service, as originally envisioned, but also in the mass-production of food-related applications such as cutlery, saucepans and processing equipment etc. Up to that time carbon-steel knives were prone to unhygienic rusting if they were not frequently polished and only expensive sterling silver or electroplated nickel silver (EPNS) cutlery was generally available to avoid such problems. With this in mind Brearley extended his examinations to include tests with food acids such as vinegar and lemon juice, with very promising results.

Brearley initially called the new alloy "rustless steel"; the more euphonic "stainless steel" was suggested by Ernest Stuart of R.F. Mosley's, a local cutlery manufacturer at Portland Works, and eventually prevailed, although Mosley's used the "Rusnorstain" trademark for many years. It is reported that the first true stainless steel, a 0.24 wt% C, 12.8 wt% Cr ferrous alloy, was produced by Brearley in an electric furnace on 13 August 1913. He was subsequently awarded the Iron and Steel Institute's Bessemer Gold Medal in 1920. The American Society for Metals gives the date for Brearley's creation of casting number 1008 (12.8% chromium, 0.44% manganese, 0.2% silicon, 0.24% carbon and 85.32% iron) as 20 August 1913.

Virtually all research projects into the further development of stainless steels were interrupted by the 1914–18 War, but efforts were renewed in the 1920s. Brearley had left the Brown Firth Laboratories in 1915, following disagreements regarding patent rights, but the research continued under the direction of his successor, Dr W. H. Hatfield. It is Hatfield who is credited with the development, in 1924, of a stainless steel which even today is probably the widest-used alloy of this type, the so-called "18/8", which in addition to chromium, includes nickel (Ni) in its composition (18wt% Cr, 8wt% Ni).

== Legacy ==
In 2013, in the Sheffield University Varsity Brewing Challenge, Sheffield University named their beer, brewed by Thornbridge, Brearleys, to commemorate 100 years since Harry Brearley invented stainless steel.

A 42 feet (13 m) mural of Brearley, marking the 100th anniversary of his invention of stainless steel, was commissioned for the side of a building on Howard Street, Sheffield, and was painted by the artist Sarah Yates (aka "Faunagraphic").

== Books ==
- H. Brearley & F. Ibbotson (1902) The Analysis of Steel-works Materials
- H. Brearley (1911) The Heat Treatment of Tool Steel
- H. Brearley (1914) The Case-Hardening of Steel
- H. Brearley (1918) The Heat Treatment of Steel
- H. Brearley (1933) Steel Makers
- H. Brearley (1941) Knotted String (autobiography)

== See also ==
- List of people from Sheffield
- Elwood Haynes
- Portland Works
