= Michael Heller (businessman) =

British business executive (1936–2023)

Sir Michael Heller
- Born: Michael Aron Heller; 15 July 1936; London, England
- Died: 30 January 2023 (aged 86)
- Education: Harrogate Grammar School
- Alma mater: St Catharine's College, Cambridge
- Occupation: Businessman
- Known for: Bisichi Mining, philanthropy
- Spouse: Morven Heller

Sir Michael Aron Heller (15 July 1936 – 30 January 2023) was a British business executive and philanthropist.

== Early life ==
Michael Aron Heller was born in London on 15 July 1936, and educated at the Harrogate Grammar School in Harrogate, North Yorkshire, England. He graduated from St Catharine's College, Cambridge, where he received a Master of Arts degree in 1955.

== Business career ==
Heller served as the Chairman of Bisichi Mining. He also served as the Chairman of London & Associated Properties. Additionally, he served as the Chairman of Electronic Data Processing.

== Philanthropy ==
Heller co-founded the Michael & Morven Heller Charitable Foundation in 1988. Thanks to a charitable gift they made to the Magen David Adom UK Friend Society in 2006, a Mobile Intensive Care Unit which drives pregnant women in Israel to the nearest hospital was named in their honour. Eight years later, in 2008, as a result of another donation, an ambulance was also named in their honour.

In 2010, they attended a fundraising dinner for the British ORT, a Jewish charity.

They also contributed to the Hampstead Theatre and the London Jewish Cultural Centre. They donated to the Save Van Dyck for the National Portrait Gallery to acquire Anthony van Dyck's self-portrait.

Heller served as the Deputy Chairman of the Conservative Friends of Israel. By 2012, he had donated over GBP£100,000 to the Conservative Party. In 2014, he attended a GBP£50,000 dinner with Conservative Prime Minister David Cameron. He also served as the Deputy Chairman of the Centre for Policy Studies, a center-right think tank based in London. He later served as a member of its Board.

Heller was named a Fellow Commoner by his alma mater, St Catharine's College, in 2003. He received an honorary degree from Sheffield Hallam University in 2010.

Heller was knighted in the 2013 New Year Honours "for charitable services".

== Personal life and death ==
Heller was married to Morven Livingstone, Lady Heller (b. 1940), daughter of Dr Julius Livingstone, a family doctor, and Pearl (née Levy). Morven was raised with her younger sister, human rights lawyer Frances Raday, in Manchester. Together they resided in Hampstead, north London.

Heller was a member of the Royal Automobile Club, a private members' club. He also collected modern art.

Heller died on 30 January 2023, at the age of 86.
