= Orchard Square =

- Orchard Square in 2026
- Location: Sheffield, South Yorkshire, England
- Coordinates: 53.381719°N 1.470363°W
- Opened: 1987
- Owner: London & Associated Properties plc
- Num. of stores: 27
- Floors: 2
- Public transit: B Y City Hall
- Website: orchardsquare.co.uk

Orchard Square is a small open-air court shopping centre located in Sheffield, England. It opened in 1987 and contains several stores, notably Schuh, Clarks, Waterstone's (with its own instore coffee house), Subway and TK Maxx (which replaced the original food court). Orchard Square also features Sheffield Creative Guild, La Coupe hair salon, Anne Heppell, Michael Spencer Jewellers, War Games Emporium and Costa.

The centrepiece of the Square is a chiming clock with moving figures that depict Sheffield's cutlery trade. To mark the centre's 21st year, Orchard Square was re-developed to facilitate the expansion of the TK Maxx to a three-level 45,000 sq ft (4,200 m^{2}) anchor store into space formerly occupied by the Stonehouse pub. The re-development was finished in October 2008, and retailers began trading in new premises shortly before Christmas 2008. As a result of the re-development the clock no longer chimes and the figures no longer move

Orchard Square features a customer loyalty card called the VIP Card. Shoppers can sign up for the card by visiting the Orchard Square website, www.orchardsquare.co.uk, or by filling in one of the application forms and putting it in the collection box by the toilets near Waterstone's. The VIP card is not a points scheme – card holders simply show the card at participating stores to receive various discounts. Regular competitions are also held for VIP card holders.

A number of public houses and restaurants are situated in the square, notably The Museum, which is situated on the site of a former mortuary, and has operated as a pub since 1897.

The Square is the site of the former works of John Brown & Co., which grew into one of the larger steel companies prior to nationalisation, with part of their later works site becoming Meadowhall Shopping Centre.
