= Shirle Hill =

Mansion in South Yorkshire, England

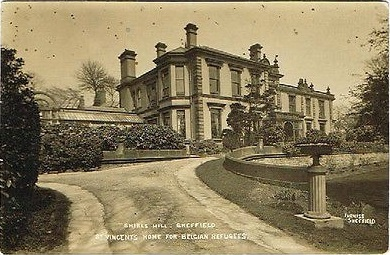
- Shirle Hill

- Shown in South Yorkshire

Geography
- Location: Cherry Tree Road, Sheffield, South Yorkshire, England
- Coordinates: 53.3645°N 1.4933°W

Organisation
- Care system: NHS

Services
- Emergency department: No

History
- Founded: 1950s
- Closed: 2012

Links
- Lists: Hospitals in England

Shirle Hill is a mansion and former health facility on Cherry Tree Road, Sheffield, South Yorkshire, England.

== History ==
The house was completed in 1809. It became the home of Sir John Brown, the industrialist, from around 1853 and Brown entertained Lord Palmerston there in 1862. From 1865 it was occupied by William Bragge, managing director of John Brown & Company, who commissioned a large additional wing, designed by Frith Brothers and Jenkinson in the Italianate style, for the house. During the First World War, it was known as St Vincent's and served as a home for Belgian refugees. It later became a school and mental health facility for children with special needs before being converted for residential use in 2012.
