= Firth Brown Steels =

Steel company in the UK

Firth Brown Steels was initially formed in 1902, when Sheffield steelmakers John Brown & Company exchanged shares and came to a working agreement with neighbouring company Thomas Firth & Sons. In 1908 the two companies came together and established the Brown Firth Research Laboratories and it was here, in 1912, under the leadership of Harry Brearley they developed high chrome stainless steel. The companies continued under their own management until they formally merged in 1930 becoming Firth Brown Steels. The company is now part of Sheffield Forgemasters.

== History ==
=== Thomas Firth & Sons ===
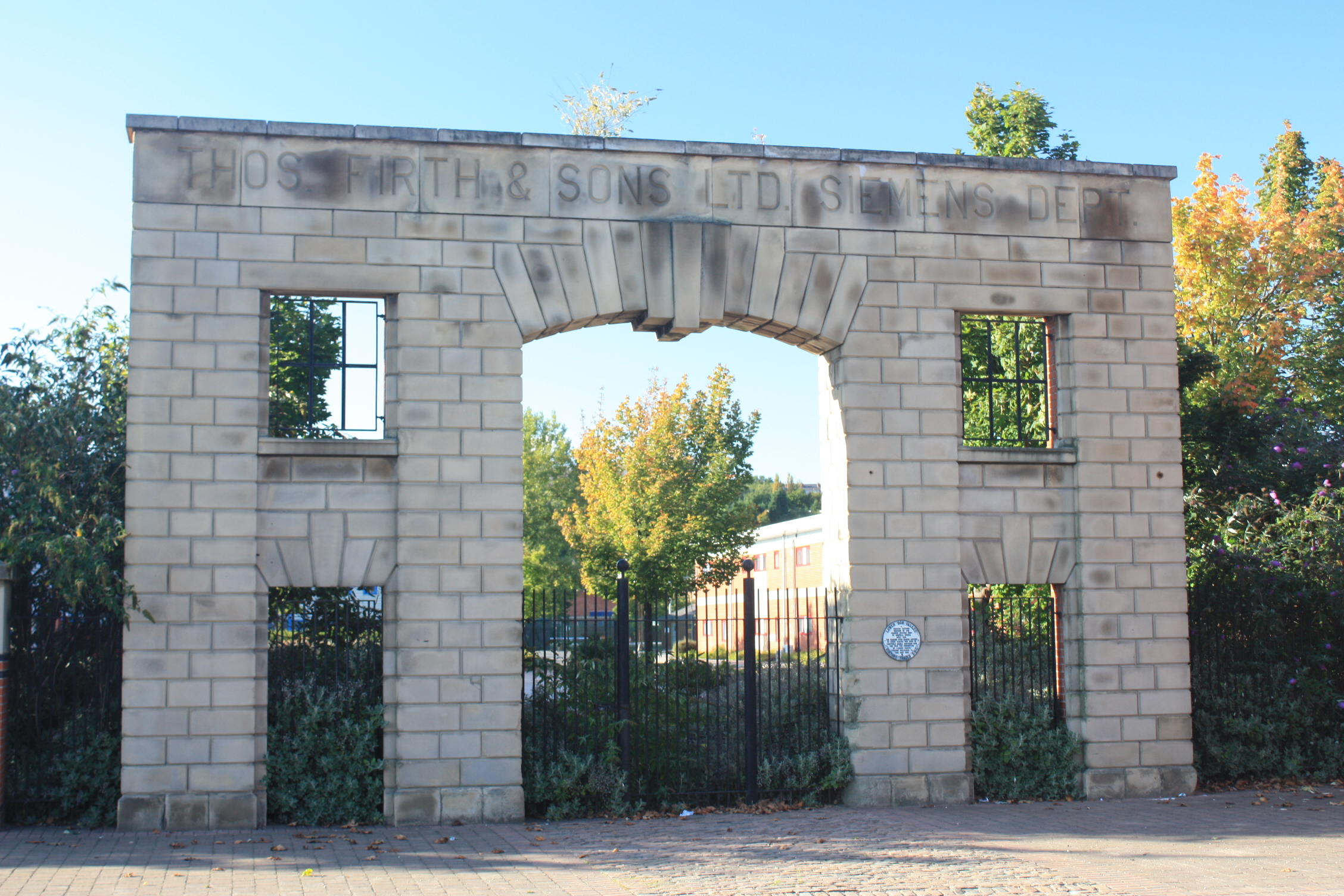
The Gateway from Thomas Firths, Norfolk Works (relocated to present site) in Sheffield.

In the late 1830s Thomas Firth was head melter at Sheffield crucible steelmakers Sanderson Brothers. He had fathered ten children, seven boys and three girls.

Two of the sons, Mark and Thomas junior followed in father's footsteps and started work at Sanderson Brothers but in 1842 left to set up their own business in Charlotte Street, Sheffield, their father joining them shortly afterwards. In ten years their business had grown and it was necessary to find larger premises. With land available they moved to a large site in Savile Street, Sheffield, adjacent to the works set up by John Brown. It was named Norfolk Works and had crucible furnaces, a file making shop and what was, at the time, the largest rolling mill in Sheffield.

In the 1850s and '60s Thomas Firth supplied Samuel Colt with most of the iron and steel used at his firearms factories both at Hartford Connecticut and the short-lived facility in Pimlico, London. Business grew and moved into the armaments market directly, the company installing two Nasmyth Steam forge hammers in 1863 which were used to forge heavy artillery pieces. In 1871, Firth's cast the thirty-five ton Woolwich Infant gun and 5 years later they produced an eighty-ton gun.

Mark, whilst at his Norfolk Works, suffered a stroke on 16 November 1880 and died at his Sheffield home 12 days later; he was buried in the General Cemetery. The company, however, continued.

=== John Brown and Company ===
John Brown founded his company in the 1840s to manufacture steel files. Over the years the emphasis moved to the manufacture of railway track, made from steel provided by the new Bessemer process, and later to rail coach springs. Shipcladding and shipbuilding interests came into the company portfolio and finally, in the 1950s, general construction.

Following an eight-year role in successfully selling files and cutlery around the world in 1844, John Brown started in his own right a steel-making company in Orchard Street, Sheffield, on the site of the present Orchard Square shopping development. There was no room for expansion on the site and his second works was opened in Furnival Street, a short distance away. Business expanded rapidly and more new premises were needed, this time in Holly Street, just over the road from his original works. Having works scattered throughout the city centre area made for production problems and because of this, on 1 January 1856, he opened a totally new works on a single site on the edge of the town, in Savile Street which he named Atlas Works.

In 1846, whilst still at Orchard Square, he invented the conical railway buffer and became a market leader in the United Kingdom. Once settled on the new Atlas Works site he decided to make use of the steel puddling process. Whilst the steel produced by this method is not of the high quality which was being made by the crucible process, it was ideal for making railway springs and buffers and, importantly, cheaper to produce.

=== Merger and takeovers ===
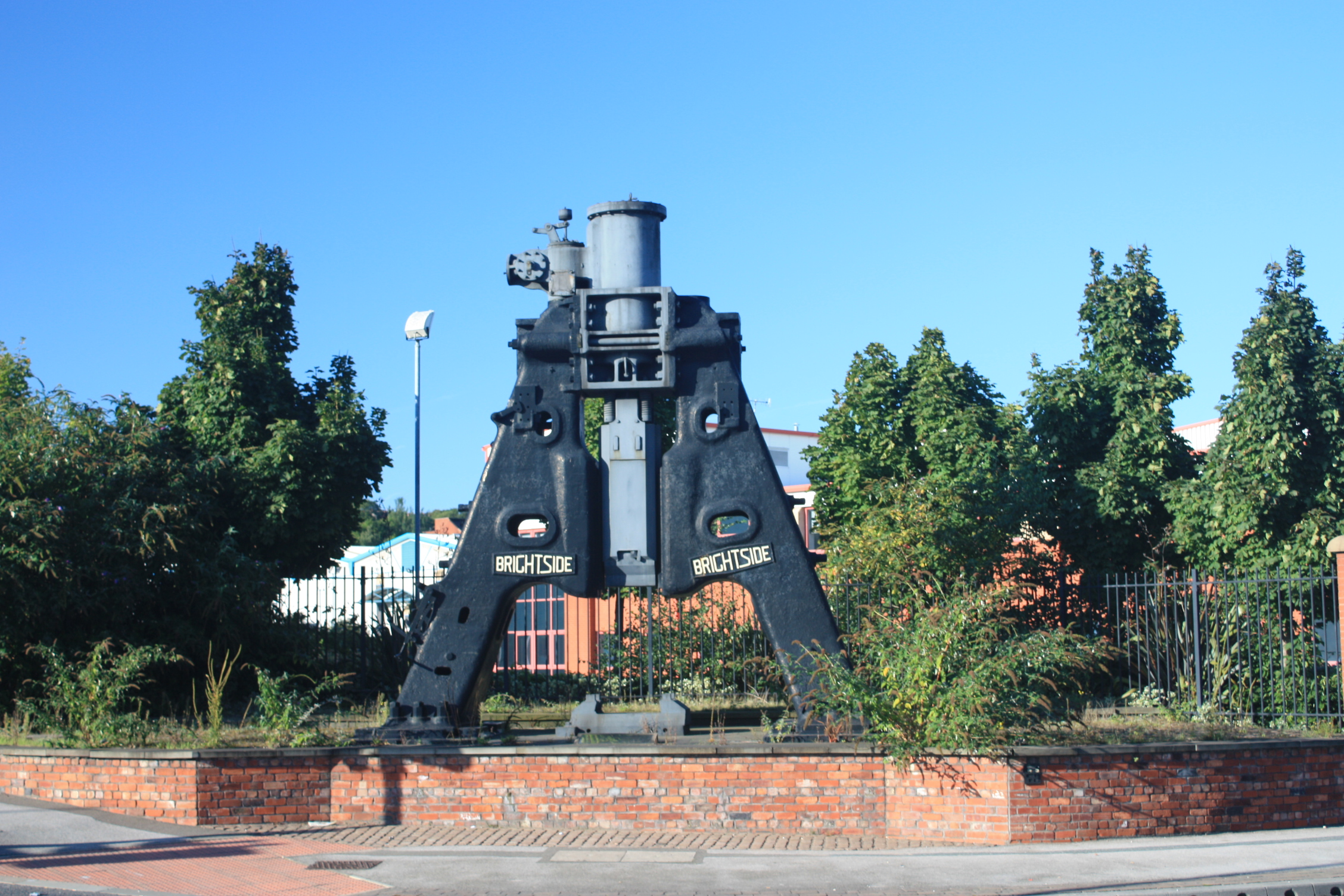
A Preserved Drop Forging Hammer on the Roadside in the Brightside area of Sheffield, near the works it used to be part of.

In 1902 Sheffield steelmakers John Brown & Company exchanged shares and came to a working agreement with neighbouring company Thomas Firth & Sons, the companies continuing under their own management until they finally merged in 1930.

In 1934 the stainless steel business, based at the Staybrite Works, Sheffield, was split off as a jointly owned company with English Steel Corporation Ltd. and was re-incorporated as Firth-Vickers Stainless Steels Ltd.

In 1936, in an attempt to extend and diversify its business interests they bought a considerable number of shares in Westland Aircraft Ltd. of Yeovil and the following year they purchased Markham & Co., of Chesterfield a company well known for its machinery, especially its winding engines and ancillary machinery for the mining industry, and tunnelling machines, which were used in excavations for the London Underground, the Moscow Metro, and the Paris Metro.

In 1957, the company acquired the Parkhead Forge in Glasgow, that had been formerly owned by William Beardmore and Company, before eventually closing the site in 1976.

In 1973 Firth Brown merged with the Derby and Manchester-based wire-making firm Richard Johnson and Nephew, to form Johnson and Firth Brown Ltd (JFB).

=== Sheffield Forgemasters ===
In 1982 Johnson Firth Brown and its near neighbour, British Steel Corporation's River Don Works, amalgamated to form Sheffield Forgemasters, with a 50:50 division of the shares between JFB and the government. The following year the company hit trouble and the shareholders voted to write off debt, sack the company's board and set up a rescue package with new management.

In 1998 the company was sold in two sections to American buyers; the aerospace section was sold to Allegheny Teledyne and the River Don and Rolls section to Atchison Castings. The latter business failed and the company went into liquidation in 2003. Only after clearing many hurdles did it become the subject of a management buyout.

Sheffield Forgemasters is now one of the oldest established steel making companies in the world.

== Marine engineering ==
In the late 1890s a spate of company mergers left John Brown's in the position where it could be forced out of the lucrative Admiralty market unless it could find another way for its products to be sold and used by the Government. The company looked around shipbuilders for a potential purchase, a yard which had plenty of Admiralty work and would be amenable to a takeover. This yard was found in the shape of the Clydebank Shipbuilding and Engineering Co., and this was bought 1899 for a sum of around 1 million GBP. The newly acquired yard became the shipbuilding division of the John Brown group.

During the first decade of the 20th century, the company succeeded becoming a leader in marine engineering technology with the development of the Brown-Curtis turbine, the propelling machinery chosen by the Royal Navy for many of its major warships.

Following the end of hostilities in 1918 orders for new ships and guns fell. Foreign competition and workers' strikes compounded Firth Brown's problems. Although the shipyards received a few orders, some from Australia, it was not until a 1931 order from the Cunard Line to build the RMS Queen Mary that things began to look up. The Cunard order was followed by one from Canadian Pacific and a further liner order from Cunard (for Queen Elizabeth). The British government ordered two sloops, two destroyers, and a 9,000-ton cruiser to follow keeping the yard busy, and profitable, through the first half of the 1930s.

By the mid-1960s, the company gave notice that its shipyard was uneconomic and potentially faced closure. In 1967, as the Cunard liner Queen Elizabeth 2 neared completion, the shipyard became part of Upper Clyde Shipbuilders but this was the beginning of the end, in 1971 UCS went into liquidation.

== Railways ==
In 1938 Firth Brown were approached by Oliver Bulleid, CME of Southern Railways, to manufacture a new type of wheel for his locomotives. Bulleid wanted a disc wheel, rather than the traditional spoked wheel, as he believed this gave a number of advantages; it would be both lighter and stronger, and, with less need for counterweighting, would reduce the hammer effect on the rails. Bulleid wanted the wheel to be manufactured in a single casting, rather than being assembled in sections, as with the American Boxpok design. Firth Brown were able to meet all these requirements, developing new processes in doing so, which were patented as the Bulleid Firth Brown locomotive wheel. These were used on all Bulleid locomotives thereafter.

== Stainless steel ==
As with many inventions there is an element of luck in the finding of a new type of steel and it is just so with stainless steel. With the coming together of Firth and Brown to build a joint research facility (Brown Firth Laboratories) in 1908, a project was instigated to study one of the problems affecting armaments production. In charge of this was Harry Brearley. The problem concerned the erosion of the internal surfaces of gun barrels and Brearley was charged with finding a suitable material which would offer better resistance to the erosion caused by high temperatures and he began to examine the addition of chromium to a standard carbon steel.

The well told story is that Brearley noticed in his sample bin one of his pieces which had not shown signs of rusting after being exposed to air and water. This was further examined and analysed; a new steel, which he called "rustless steel", was born, the first commercial cast coming from the furnaces in 1913. Its name was changed the more euphonic "stainless steel" following a suggestion from Ernest Stuart of R.F. Moseley's, a local cutlery maker, and this eventually prevailed.

Brearley also appreciated the potential of these new steels for applications not only in high temperature service, as originally envisaged, but also in the mass production of food-related applications such as cutlery, saucepans and processing equipment etc.

=== 18/8 Staybrite ===
Virtually all research into the further development of stainless steels was interrupted by the First World War, but started again in the 1920s. Although Harry Brearley resigned from the Brown Firth Laboratories in 1915, following a disagreement over patent rights, the research continued under the direction of his successor, Dr. W. H. Hatfield. It is he who is credited with the development, in 1924, of a stainless steel which is still the widest-used alloy of this type, the so-called "18/8" – Staybrite, which in addition to chromium, includes nickel in its composition.

Stainless steel was developed for a variety of industrial uses but it became clear that it could have uses around the home. It was first shown in this context at the "Daily Mail" Ideal Home Exhibition, staged at London's Olympia in 1934. A large area, sponsored by Firth Brown, was named "Staybrite City", (taking its name from the trade mark name of the company's stainless steel). Stands within the area included that of J & J Wiggin and the Old Hall tableware exhibited there proved to be a resounding success. Dr. W H Hatfield commissioned Harold Stabler, one of the country's leading industrial designers, to design a new range of high quality tea and coffee services for Old Hall. They were extremely elegant but subsequently proved to be expensive to manufacture.

18/8 has since been standardised internationally as SAE 304.

=== Rex 78 ===
A specialised high-temperature steel devised in 1939 was Rex 78 and its derivatives, Rex 78 being used on the turbine blading of Frank Whittle's early jet engines such as the Power Jets W.1.
