= Thurlstone =

Village in South Yorkshire, England

Coordinates: 53.525°N 1.629°W

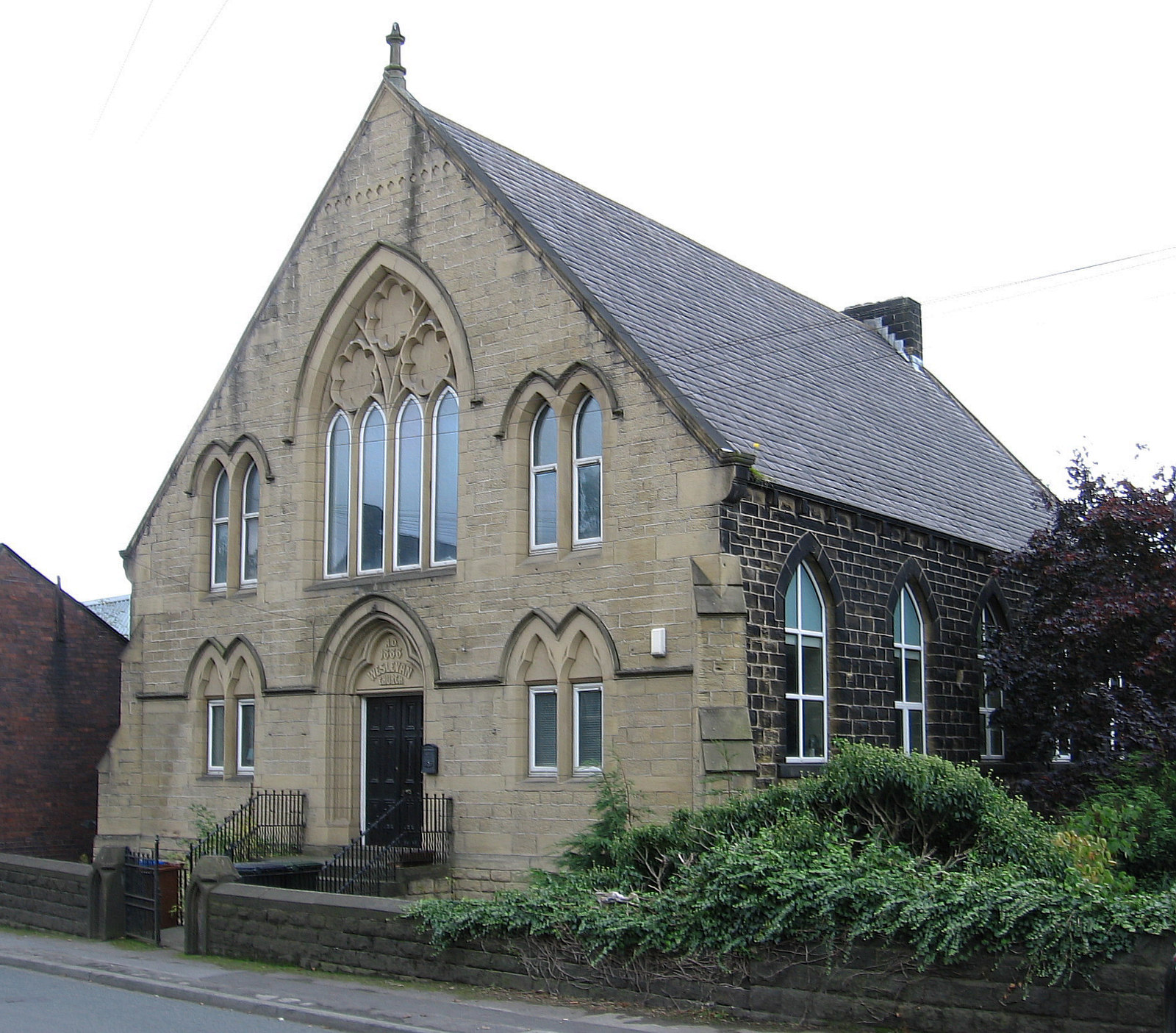
- Thurlstone – Wesleyan Church

- Location within South Yorkshire
- OS grid reference: SE232034
- Civil parish: Penistone
- Metropolitan borough: Barnsley
- Metropolitan county: South Yorkshire
- Region: Yorkshire and the Humber
- Country: England
- Sovereign state: United Kingdom
- Post town: SHEFFIELD
- Postcode district: S36
- Dialling code: 01226
- Police: South Yorkshire
- Fire: South Yorkshire
- Ambulance: Yorkshire
- UK Parliament: Penistone and Stocksbridge

Thurlstone is a village and former civil parish, now in the parish of Penistone, in the metropolitan borough of Barnsley, in South Yorkshire, England. Originally it was a small farming community. Some industries developed using water power from the River Don such as corn milling, wire drawing and various wool and cloth processes. Most of these are now gone and only James Durrans (carbon products) and Service Direct owned by 'Don Eddie' remain. The village is now a dormitory for the urban areas of South and West Yorkshire. The village now falls in the Penistone West ward of the Barnsley MBC.

Its name is believed to be of Old English origin, possibly referring to the god Thunor. Other sources argue that its name is taken from thirled (pierced) rock which is found at its location. The nearby village Thurgoland may have a similar derivation.

The parish church is the Church of St Saviour. It is situated about 8 miles (13 km) from Barnsley, 14 miles (23 km) from Huddersfield, 17 miles (27 km) from both Sheffield, and Glossop, 27 miles (43 km) from Leeds, and 28 miles (45 km) from Manchester.

== Governance ==
Thurlstone was formerly a township in the parish of Penistone, from 1866 Thurlstone was a civil parish in its own right, on 1 April 1938 the parish was abolished and merged with Penistone, part also went to form Dunford. In 1931 the parish had a population of 2,640. In 1894 Thurlstone became an urban district, on 1 April 1938 the district was abolished and merged with Penistone Urban District and Penistone Rural District.

Thurlstone was originally in the Wapentake of Staincross which more or less corresponds with today's Barnsley Borough Area.

== Notable people ==
- Nicholas Saunderson – A prominent member of the scientific community in the 18th century was born in the village.
- John Stones – England international professional footballer, "The Barnsley Beckenbauer" hails from the village.

== Images ==
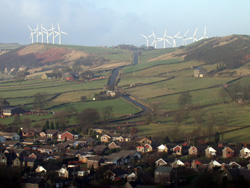
Looking over to Royd Moor Wind Farm from Thurlstone.

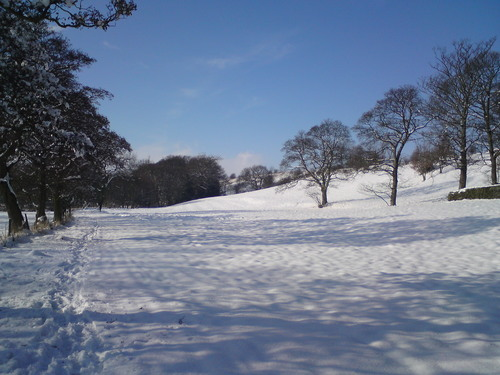
Work Bank Lane in Thurlstone during the 2 February 2009 Snow in the UK.

== See also ==
- Listed buildings in Penistone
