= Saint John the Baptist Church, Penistone =

Church of England church in South Yorkshire, England

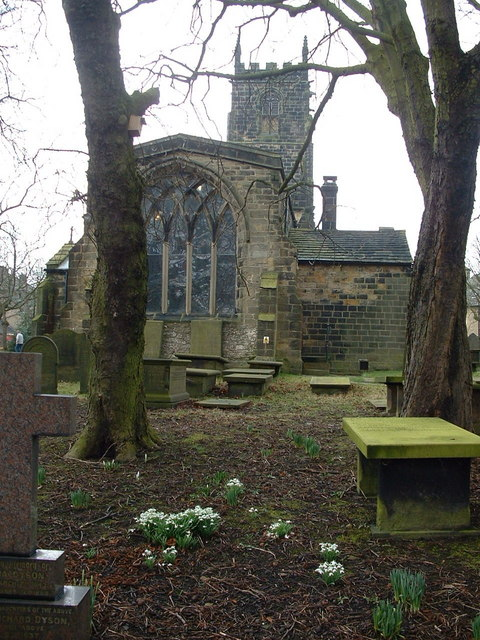
- St John the Baptist, seen from the churchyard
- Saint John the Baptist Church, Penistone
- 53.5259°N 1.6297°W
- OS grid reference: SE 24651 03316
- Denomination: Church of England
- Churchmanship: Broad Church

History
- Dedication: St. John the Baptist

Architecture
- Heritage designation: Grade I listed building
- Designated: 23 June 1965

Administration
- Province: York
- Diocese: Wakefield
- Parish: Penistone

Saint John the Baptist Church, Penistone Parish Church, or Penistone Church is a Church of England church in the Parish of Penistone, near Barnsley, in South Yorkshire, England. The church is a Grade I listed building and is located in the centre of the town of Penistone.

== History ==
There are records which show priests belonging to a church in Penistone from the year 1200. However, masonry work in the church indicates parts could be over 1000 years old. There are also remains of a Saxon cross building into the church walls, possibly indicating an even older Christian involvement in the area. A further cross base and stump lie in the churchyard.

The 80 ft (24 m) tower is around 500 years old, having been erected around 1500.

The lychgate entrance to the church yard was constructed in 1959 as a memorial to Rev. Canon William Turnbull, who was vicar at the church 1855–1915, while the stainless steel weathervane on top of the tower, in the shape of a fish, was a handmade gift from local resident; Arnold Lesley Smith (1916–1986), in 1975. The fish is an early Christian symbol and its stainless steel represents local industry.

The church windows contain a large amount of stained glass, much of it many hundreds of years old. New glass has been installed, most notably in 1992, to celebrate the 600th anniversary of Penistone Grammar School.

The church tower has two clockfaces – one on the west side, and another on the south side. The tower holds a total of 8 bells.

In 2006 the church was the location of a service attended by Mayors and civic heads from across Yorkshire as part of the Yorkshire Day celebrations being hosted in Penistone. The same year saw the creation of a new Heritage and Sensory Gardens (St Johns Gardens) in the lower end of the church yard, including millstones with historical local dates and a memorial to Nicholas Saunderson, who was Lucasian Professor of Mathematics at Cambridge University.

The church was subject to interior work in 2006, with the creation of new community facilities, under the auspices of Revd David J. Hopkin.

== See also ==
- Grade I listed buildings in South Yorkshire
- Listed buildings in Penistone
