= Millhouse Green =

Village in South Yorkshire, England

Coordinates: 53.52412°N 1.67265°W

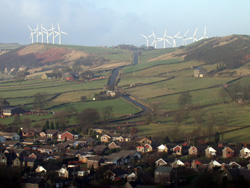
Looking over to Royd Moor Wind Farm across the eastern edge of Millhouse Green

Millhouse Green is a village in the Metropolitan Borough of Barnsley on the north banks of the River Don to the west of Penistone in the English county of South Yorkshire.

Millhouse Green forms part of the Metropolitan Borough of Barnsley and Penistone civil parish. The village falls within the Penistone West ward of the Barnsley MBC.

== Transport and local services ==
Millhouse Green is located on the A628 road at its junction with the B6106, which runs to Holmfirth in West Yorkshire. It is home to the expected amenities of a village of this size. There is a small shop near the centre which sells freshly made food and a small selection of groceries. The Millhouse Green Institute is a village hall which plays host to small events and has a crown green bowling square and tennis court at the rear. There is also a pub, the Blacksmith Arms, and further out from the centre, the Windmill Nursery, which has a cafe, the Windmill Coffee Shop, is located next to Royd Moor Wind Farm.

== Education ==
The village is home to Millhouse Primary School a small, mixed primary school. It has from 100 - 140 students depending on intake.

== See also ==
- Listed buildings in Penistone
