= Hartcliff Folly =

Stone structure in England

Coordinates: 53.5130°N 1.6636°W

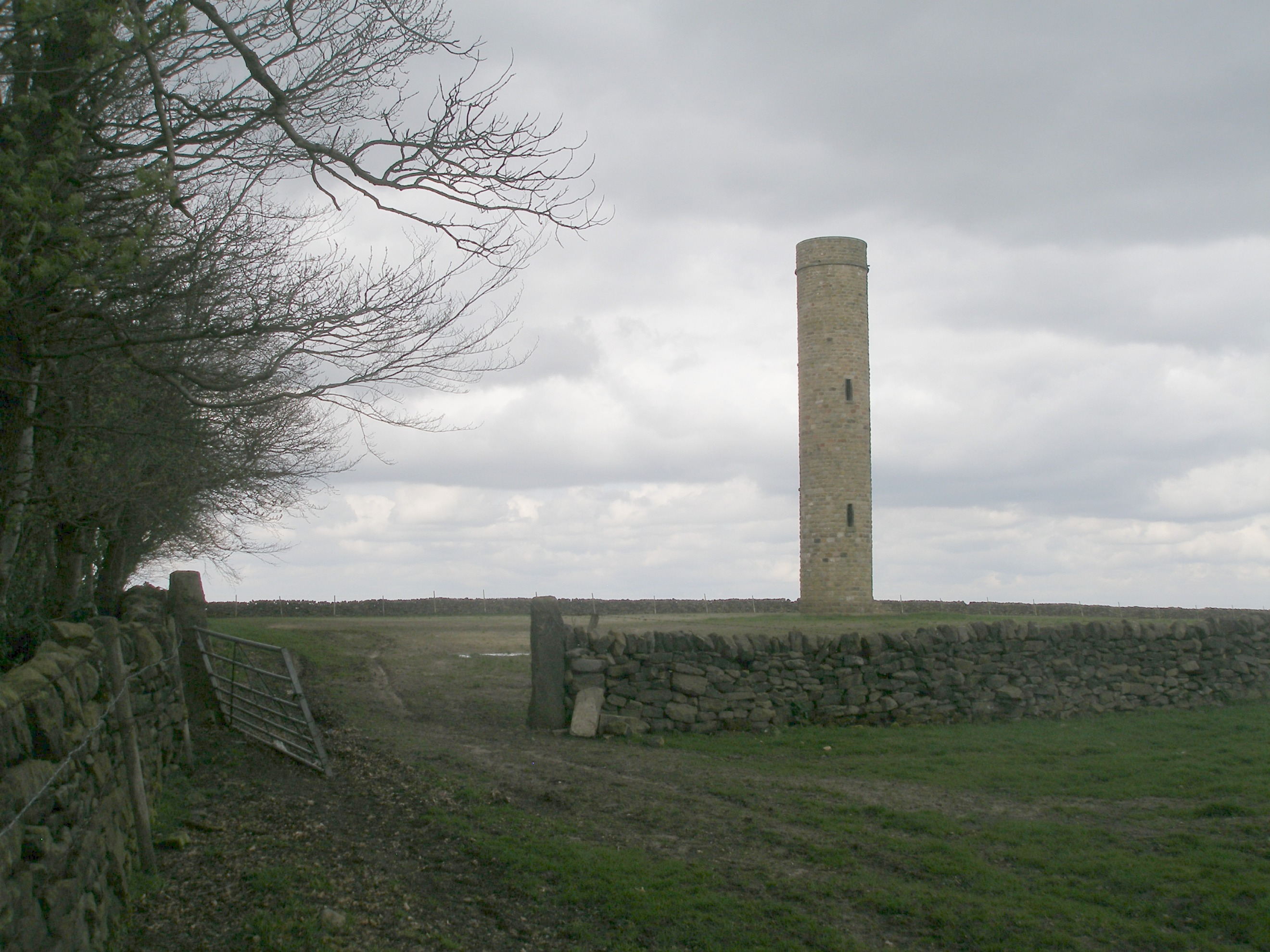
Hartcliffe Folly, Near Penistone

The Hartcliff Folly (or Tower) is a stone structure 1.2 miles (2 km) south-west of Penistone in South Yorkshire, England. The folly was built in 1856 by a linen merchant called Henry Richardson and stands at 1,175 feet (358 m) above sea level. Richardson also built Hartcliffe Lodge before becoming the first Mayor of the borough of Barnsley. The tower may be a Folly (a structure built for no reason other than to demonstrate the social and economic status of its owner), but it has an internal spiral staircase and some believe that it was used as a viewing platform for game shooting. Another idea is that it was used as a look out for Mr. Richardson returning from Manchester on business.

The furthest landmark visible from the tower is Hawkstone Park in Shropshire (60 miles away).

The Folly had fallen into disrepair but was restored in 2002 by Mr. Jeff Pears, upon whose land it is sited. He rebuilt it at his own expense as a gift to the community of Penistone. It has since occasionally been open to the public, such as on 1 August 2006 when Penistone hosted the 'Yorkshire Day' celebrations.

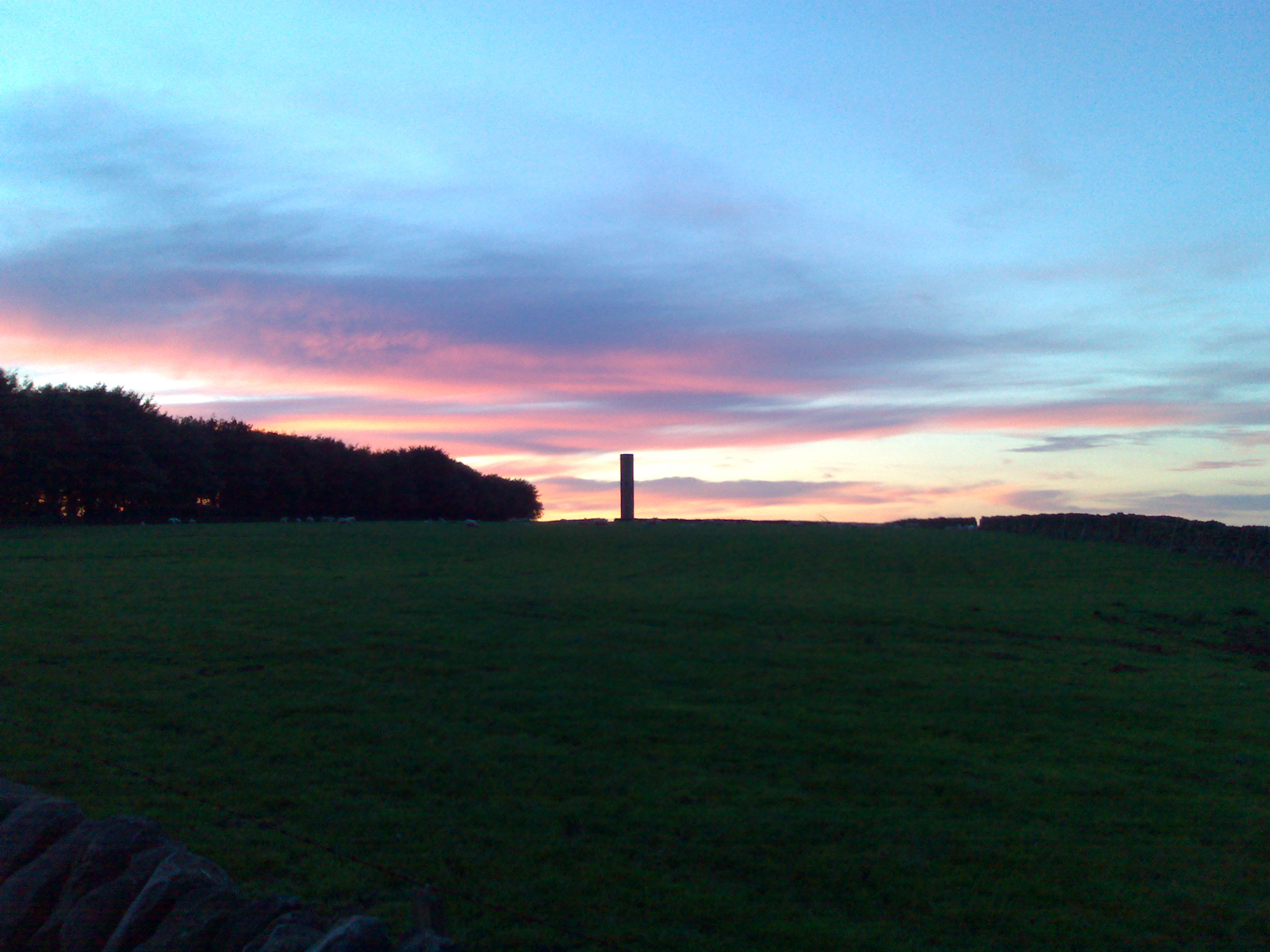
Hartcliff Folly at Sunset, Near Penistone
