= Penistone Show =

British agricultural show

Penistone Show is a one-day agricultural show held annually in Penistone in South Yorkshire, England, UK. The show has been held most years for the last 150 years and is always held on the second Saturday in September (so it will always fall between 8 and 14 September.)

It is said to be the largest one day show in the North of England, with visitor numbers exceeding 10,000 in some years.

The show consists of a number of different competition classes, from livestock to show jumping and dog shows to horticulture, handicrafts and photographs. The show also offers entertainment and displays from choirs and brass bands to sheep shearing, singing and dry stone walling.

The show has almost been held annually without fail. A few years were missed due to the World Wars however. The foot and mouth disease troubles in 2001 did not cause Penistone show to be cancelled. Instead the show went ahead without the livestock. In 2007 another foot and mouth crisis also eliminated the livestock element again. However, the sanctions were lifted just in time to allow the cattle and sheep classes to go ahead. The goat and pigs were unable to make an appearance.

In recent years Penistone Community Radio (formerly Penistone FM) has also been broadcasting live during show day.
