= Penistone Town Hall =

Municipal building in Penistone, South Yorkshire, England

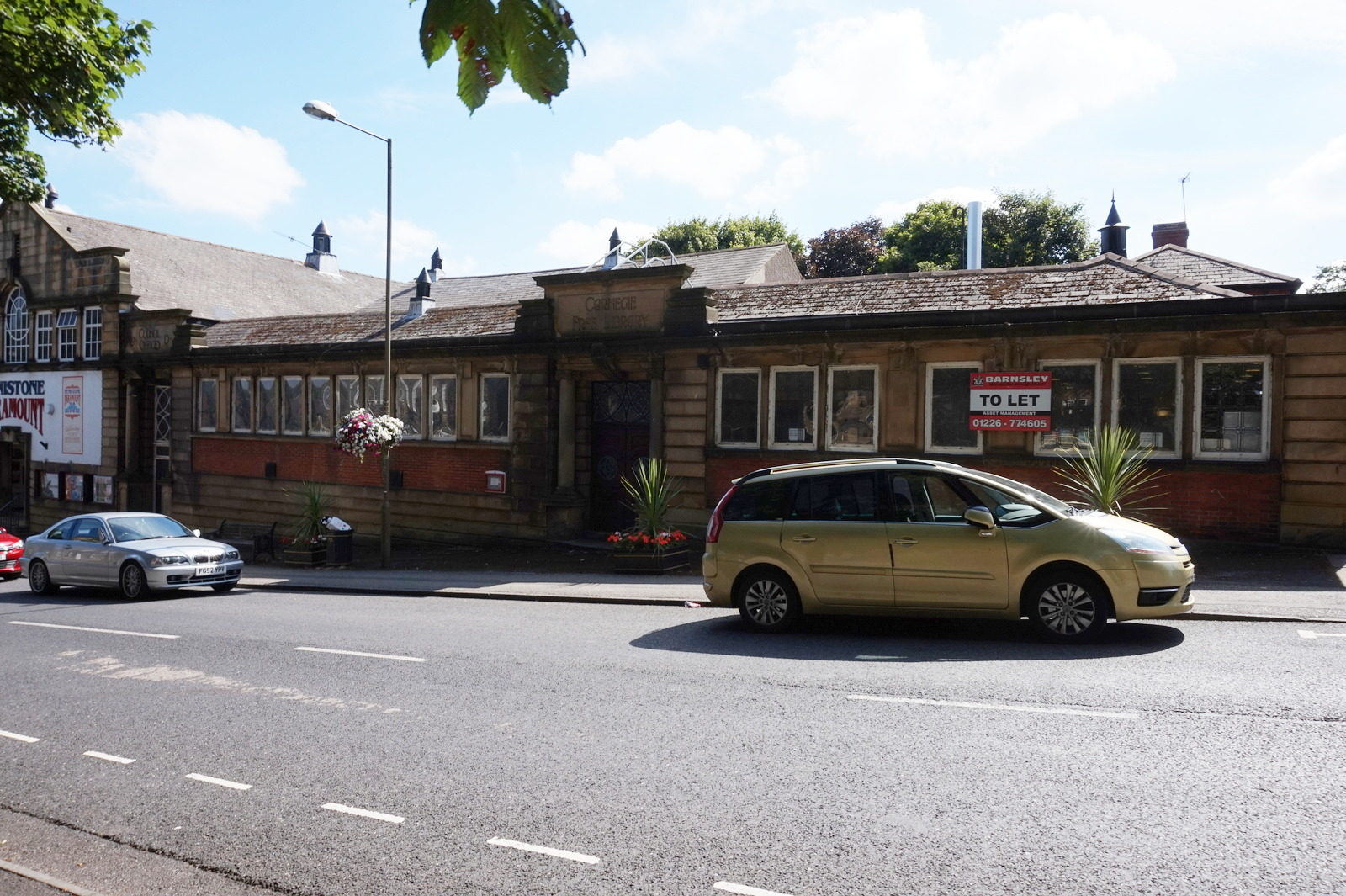
- The building in 2016

- Shown in South Yorkshire
- 53.5255°N 1.6284°W
- Location: Shrewsbury Road, Penistone

History
- Built: 1914

Site notes
- Architect: Henry R. Collins
- Architectural style: Art Deco style

Penistone Town Hall is a municipal building in Shrewsury Road in Penistone, a town in South Yorkshire, in England. It serves as the meeting place of Penistone Town Council.

== History ==
Following significant population growth, largely associated with its status as a market town, a local board of health was formed in Penistone. After the local board of health was succeeded by an urban district council in 1894, the new council decided to commission new council offices as well as a Carnegie library and an assembly hall. The site they selected, on the south side of Shrewsbury Road, was acquired from the Sheffield Shrewsbury Hospital Trustees.

The new council offices were designed by Henry R. Collins in the Art Deco style, built in stone dressings at a cost of £1,000 and were officially opened by Alderman Edward Woodhead on 31 October 1914. The two-storey council offices block, which was well set back from the road, formed part of a larger complex with the assembly hall to the east and the library to the west. Access to the council offices was through a rusticated entrance section, which featured a doorway with a square fanlight flanked by Ionic order columns supporting an entablature and a panel inscribed with the words "Council Offices". Internally, the principal room was the council chamber.

The council offices were used as a British Army recruitment centre during the First World War, and for dances during the Second World War. The library services relocated to new premises in the High Street in 1966, and the whole of the former library wing was converted into council offices. The first floor of the council offices block was occupied by a masonic lodge.

The building continued to serve as the offices of Penistone Urban District Council for much of the 20th century, but ceased to be the local seat of government when Barnsley Metropolitan Borough Council was formed in 1974. The building subsequently became the offices and meeting place of Penistone Town Council. In February 2022, Barnsley Metropolitan Borough Council proposed a refurbishment, converting the council chamber into a multifunctional area, adding an exhibition space, and introducing an internal link with the former assembly hall, now known as the Penistone Paramount Cinema.
