= Eileen Colwell =

British librarian

- Born: 16 June 1904
- Died: 17 September 2002 (aged 98)
- Occupation: Librarian

Eileen Hilda Colwell (16 June 1904 – 17 September 2002) was an English pioneer children's librarian, "the doyenne of children's librarianship in Great Britain".

== Life ==
Born at The Manse, Robin Hood's Bay, Fylingdales, near Whitby in the North Riding of Yorkshire, Colwell was the third daughter of Methodist minister Richard Harold Colwell and his wife Gertrude (née Mason). After her education at Penistone Grammar School, she obtained a scholarship and studied librarianship at University College London. She had become interested in the idea of a children's library at an early age but the UCL course (then the only one of its kind in the country) did not cover the subject.

After leaving college she worked at Bolton Library in Manchester before obtaining the new post of Children's Librarian for the Hendon Urban District in North London in October 1926. Hendon Free Library had come about largely due to the efforts of Sarah Bannister who was a district councillor. After mostly providing schools with "book cupboards" Colwell built the children's collection (2,000 volumes) from scratch. In 1929 Colwell was made permanent children's librarian with the opening of Hendon Library where she remained for forty years. She pioneered the use of story telling hours (sometimes with a puppet called Jacko), and let the children help with the running of the library.

In 1937, Colwell and Ethel Hayler founded the Association of Children's Librarians, which would ten years later evolve into the Youth Library (now group) Section of the Library Association. She would go on to fight for librarians to be included in judging in the Carnegie Medal and Kate Greenaway Medal. In 1965 she was made an MBE. In 1967 she left Hendon, and for a while lectured at Loughborough University. She made several radio programmes with the BBC, and between 1966 and 1967 she appeared as a storyteller on the BBC children's programme Jackanory narrating in several episodes.

== Death and legacy ==
Colwell died in 2002. Her archive, the Eileen Colwell collection of children's literature, is held at the Seven Stories museum. In 2012 the council agreed to refurbish Hendon Library despite calls to close it. The council noted Colwell's contribution and the "blueprint she created" for children's librarians.

== Works ==
- Princess Splendour And Other Stories (1969)
- The Magic Umbrella And Other Stories Of Telling (1977)
- Autobiography, Once Upon A Time (2000)
