= Penistone Grammar School =

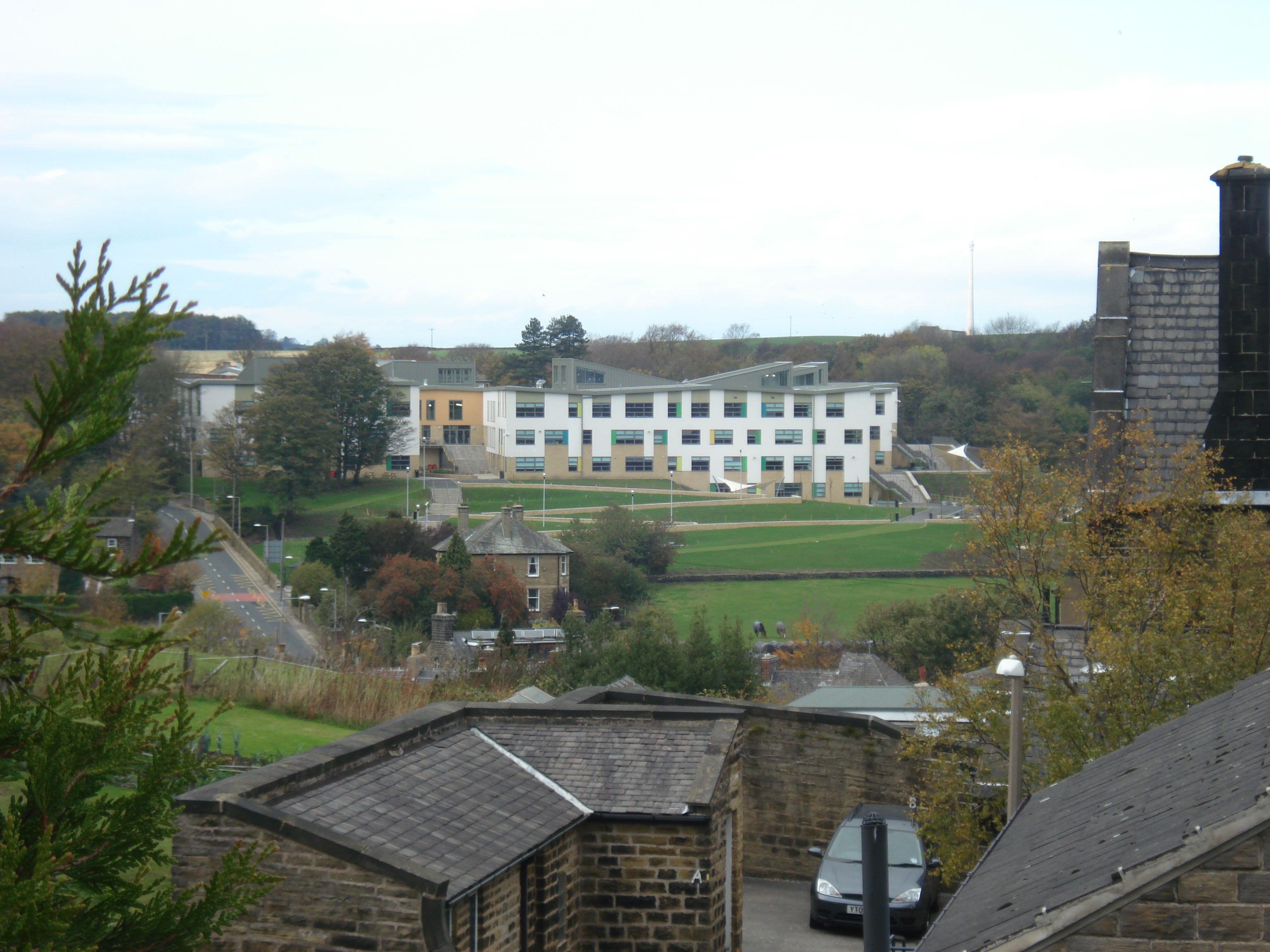

Location
- Huddersfield Road; Penistone, South Yorkshire, S36 7BX; England; 53.5327°N 1.6361°W

Information
- Type: Community school Comprehensive school
- Mottoes: Disce aut discede (traditional, Learn or Leave) "Never Stop Flying" (current)
- Established: 1392; 634 years ago
- Founder: Thomas Clarel
- Local authority: Barnsley
- Department for Education URN: 106653 Tables
- Ofsted: Reports
- Headteacher: Paul Crook
- Gender: Co-educational
- Age: 11 to 18
- Enrolment: 1,922
- Capacity: 1,877
- Sixth form students: 224
- Colours: Red and Black. (Houses: Green – Colwell, Light Blue – Saunderson, Cyan – Weirfield, Orange – Fulford, Purple – Bowman, Yellow – Armitage)
- Endowment: £39 million (2024)
- Website: www.penistone-gs.uk

Penistone Grammar School (PGS) is a large co-educational secondary school with a sixth form located in Penistone, South Yorkshire, England.

Founded in 1392, it is amongst the oldest extant schools in England, with alumni including Nicholas Saunderson, the probable inventor of Bayes' theorem, in the 18th century. At various times in its history it has been single-sex and mixed, free and fee-paying, selective and comprehensive, boarding and day. It has undergone several moves and extensions, and today houses around 1922 pupils from age 11 to 18. PGS' Ofsted overall rating is grade 2 ('Good'), following an inspection in February 2023.

== History ==
The school was founded as the Free Grammar School of Penistone (then often spelt 'Peniston') in 1392, when it is recorded that a gift of land was made by Thomas Clarel, Lord of the manor at Penistone, to John Del Rodes "and others". The land, Kirk Flatt, was situated in the town centre on a site opposite St. John the Baptist Church (a site later rebuilt as the Sheffield Union Bank, which later became an HSBC branch, and is today the Vault restaurant).

Penistone Grammar School's foundation deed: Thomas Clarel, Dominus (that is Lord) de Peniston in 1392, granted to John del Rodes and others a piece of land in the Kirk-flatt, sicut se extendit et jacet inter quinque lapides per manus predicti Thomas Clarel pro metis positos, with license to grave turf on the Moors of Penistone.

Thomas Clarel was born 28 Edward III 1355, and died by drowning in the River Don, on 1 May 1442. His will was dated 20 November 1441, and he was buried in the friary church, Tickhill, near the family's hall. The school was originally an all-boys grammar school, accepting both boarders and day pupils.

In 1443 the Free Grammar School of Penistone received further bequests and in 1547, after the dissolution of the chantries, the school continued as the free school for the children of Penistone. Following further endowments, the school was rebuilt in 1714.

PGS played a role in creating association football. In 1836, headmaster Samuel Sunderland brought a football game to PGS from the University of Cambridge. At that time, most schools had their own ball games but when students at Cambridge wanted to play together they had to agree on one style, which later was published as the Cambridge rules. His PGS student John Charles Shaw took this game to the first two FA clubs, Sheffield F.C. in 1857 and Hallam F.C. in 1860, which first wrote their own Sheffield rules then merged them with Cambridge's to create the modern laws of the game in 1863. Another student, John Marsh, founded Sheffield Wednesday F.C. in 1867.

In 1886, the Charities Commission restructured the school, replacing the majority of its trustees with local government representation.

In 1893, the school withdrew from its town centre site to a position about half a mile north-west of the town centre, at Weirfield House. The school remains on this site.

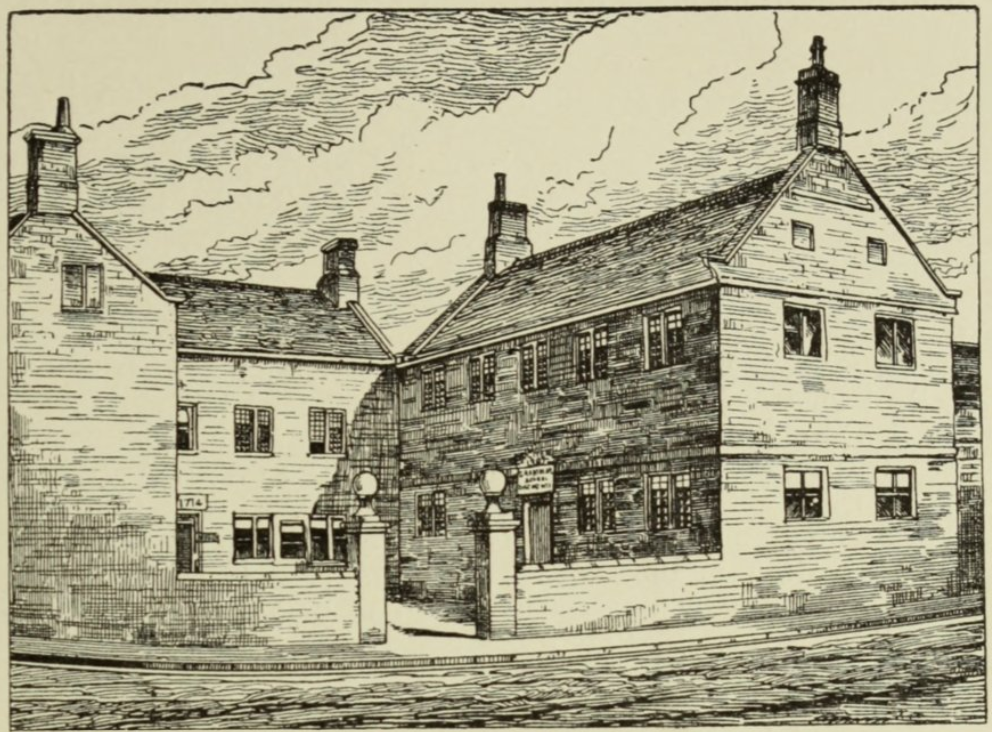
Penistone Grammar School at Kirk Flatt, from Dransfield's History of Penistone. Datestone: 1714. The main entrance of the later bank was built on the exact location of this school gate.

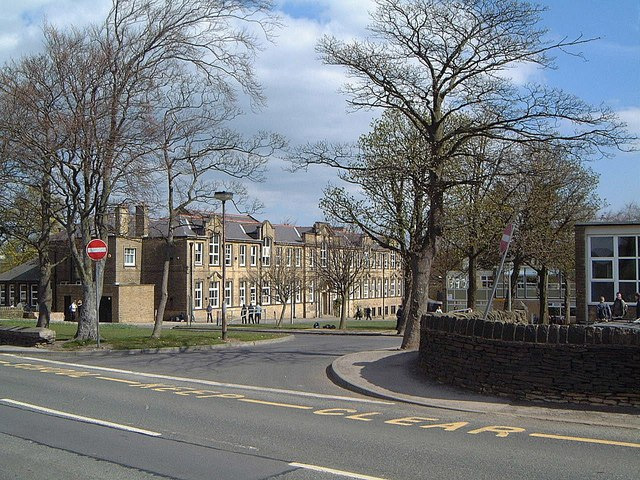
Fulford Hall; opened 28 October 1911, demolished 2014

Girls were admitted for the first time in 1907 (though mixed-sex classes were not until 1911). Fulford was the last headmaster to see boarders, with PGS becoming a day school in 1921.

On 28 October 1911, under the tenure of Mr Fulford, the Fulford building opened (though not called that at the time), at a cost of £8,000 (plus £780 for furnishings and equipment). Several other buildings were erected, and in 1974, PGS purchased the former Penistone Union Workhouse, later named 'Netherfields', which became the school's sixth form.

The school moved to allow open access to local pupils with partial selection for more distant pupils from 1957, then became fully comprehensive in 1969. The school has retained its grammar school name and traditions such as the house system and speech night.

In 2011 the school entirely demolished all buildings (except Weirfield and its Stables, which were converted into flats) and replaced them with a new modern building.

The school uses a badge based on the coat of arms of the founding family, the Clarels, which shows six martlets, from which the school colors red and black are derived. The school's traditional motto is "Disce Aut Discede" ("Learn or leave") but since 2010 it has used "Never Stop Flying", a reference to martlets having no feet so always being in flight.

== Present day ==
A £35-million school building opened on 2 May 2011, with a complete demolition of the old buildings, except for Fulford, the Stables, and Weirfield. Fulford, erected in 1909, was demolished in 2014 after protest from past students and locals.

In 2017, Penistone Grammar School introduced a controversial, zero tolerance style behaviour management scheme, under which pupils are reprimanded (known as 'getting a line') for even minor issues such as forgetting a pen or leaving a shirt untucked.

After internal remodelling in 2018, work started on a £4.3 million two-storey extension in 2019, providing an additional 250 places at the school. The building was opened to students in September 2020, and is linked to the main school by a walkway through the science department. The block is home to the modern foreign languages department and several science classrooms.

As of 2022, Penistone Grammar School is the only secondary school in the Metropolitan Borough of Barnsley not to have academy status, remaining under the control of the Local Authority.

The sixth form at Penistone currently has 300 students in attendance. Penistone Grammar School is the only school in the Local Education Authority of Barnsley to have a sixth form alongside its secondary provision.

The school maintains a 30-acre site in the west of Penistone, including extensive playing fields, used mostly for association football, rugby, cricket, and athletics. Facilities include a gym, dance studio, 3G football pitches and tennis courts. It has a theatre and music studios. It has a Combined Cadet Force.

=== Secondary results ===
Penistone Grammar School's secondary results are the best of any school in the Barnsley local authority, achieving an above average Progress 8 score of 0.46. In 2023, 83% of pupils passed English and maths, with 66% of pupils achieved a grade 5 (strong pass) or higher.

=== Sixth Form results ===
The sixth form is selective and has been within the top 10% of providers nationally for over five consecutive years. The majority (55%) of grades secured are A* or A, and in 2022, the average result was an A-.

== Penistone Grammar School Foundation ==
The Penistone Grammar School Foundation is a charity (number 529458) established in January 1957, but registered in 1965. It owns much of the school's old Kirk Flatt site and its current estate, which generates income for the school, including from renting out facilities for local community use outside of school hours. The foundation is separate from local authority control, with its own governors, providing the school with some independence. Foundation funds are used to cover additional activities such as clubs and trips selected by the foundation, and sixth form student bursaries. Bursaries currently include unconditional, equal cash payments distributed to all students selected for sixth form entry, and additional hardship funds for students in need.

== Houses ==
The school maintains a house system, with each being named after locally significant people and its former buildings.

Current houses at PGS
House	Colour	Named after
Armitage	Yellow	Heather Armitage – British Olympic sprinter
Bowman	Purple	Eric Fisher Bowman – Headmaster 1928–1958
Colwell	Green	Eileen Colwell – Children's library pioneer
Fulford	Orange	Joseph Woodward Fulford – Headmaster 1893–1921
Saunderson	Light blue	Nicholas Saunderson – Mathematician and former student (1682–1739)
Weirfield	Cyan	Weirfield House – Former schoolhouse and staff area from 1893 until c. 2011

Former houses at PGS
House	Colour	Named after
Armitage	Yellow	Armitage family – Local gentry
Bosville	Blue	Bosville family of Gunthwaite – Local land owners
Clarel	Red	Thomas Clarel – Founder
Dransfield	Green	John Ness Dransfield – Local historian and author of A History of the Parish of Penistone (1906)
Netherfield	Green	Netherfield Union Workhouse – Former home to the sixth form college

== List of headmasters ==
List of headmasters at Penistone Grammar School since 1392
Years	Name	Notes
c.1392–1433	John Del Rodes	Custos of Saint John's Chapel
c.1433–1450	John Smyth	Chaplain
1450–1472	William Wordsworth	Chantry Priest at St Mary's
1472–1477	William Walker	Chantry Priest at St Mary's
1477–1534	William Addy Snr	Chantry Priest at St Mary's
1534–1556	William Addy Jnr	Chantry Priest at St Mary's
1556–1613	John Hyde	
1613–1630	Richard Hey	Died 28 May 1630
1630–1644	John Coatehill	Died 8 May 1644
1644–1666	George Didsbury	Died 24 April 1666
1666–1668	John Revel	Resigned
1668–1702	Nathan Staniforth	Died 24 November 1702
1702–1726	John Ramsden	Died 12 March 1726. Buried in the same grave as Nathan Staniforth at Penistone Church.
1726–1751	Jonathan Perkin	Died 3 May 1751
1751–1776	Francis Haigh	Died 15 November 1776
1776–1786	Joseph Horsfall	Resigned
1786–1836	Jonathan Wood	Wrote a biography of Nicholas Saunderson. Died 22 April 1836
1836–1855	Samuel Sunderland	Brought football from Cambridge to PGS. Vicar of Penistone. Died 18 July 1855.
1855–1867	John Wesley Aldom	Resigned
1867	Alfred Steane	Resigned after three months
1867	George Curtis Price	Appointed but declined
1867–1868	Walter Mooney Hatch	Resigned after a few months
1868–1884	Theophilus Jackson	Resigned
1884–1885	Othman Blakey	Resigned
1885–1888	Harry Hardy	Resigned and became assistant 1888
1888–1892	Lionel Ernest Adams	Resigned
1893–1921	Joseph Woodward Fulford	
1921–1928	Guy Wilfred Morris	Resigned, became Master at Colfe's Grammar School.
1928–1958	Eric Fisher Bowman	
1958–1976	Wilfrid Burgess Simms	
1976–1997	Martin Antony (Tony) Bould	Retired 1997. Died 6 October 2014
1997–1999	Andrew ('Andy') White	
1999–2002	Pamela Caunt	
2002–2007	Glynis Gower	Retired
2007–2017	Joanne Higgins	Resigned, became CEO of Dudley Academies Trust
2017–	Paul Crook	

== Notable Old Penistonians ==
- Nicholas Saunderson (1682–1739) – mathematician and Lucasian Professor at Cambridge University 1711–1739
- Ebenezer Elliott (1781–1849) – poet
- John Charles Shaw (1830–1918) – captain of the first football club
- John Marsh (1843–1880) – founder of Sheffield Wednesday F.C
- Alec Glassey (1887–1970) – Liberal MP for East Dorset 1929–1931
- Eileen Colwell (1904–2002) – pioneer children's librarian
- Sir Leonard Crossland (1914–1999) – Ford UK chairman
- Max Walters (1920–2005) – botanist
- Geoffrey Allan Crossley (1920–2009) – diplomat and British Ambassador to Colombia and the Holy See
- Noel Moore (1928–2008) – civil servant who oversaw the decimalisation project
- Neil Robinson (1929–2009) – Archdeacon of Suffolk 1987–1994
- Alan Mercer (1931–2014) – Professor of Operational Research
- Heather Armitage (1933–) – British gold medal sprinter
- Roland Boyes (1937–2006) – Labour MP for Houghton and Washington (1992–1997); MEP for Durham 1979–1984
- David Hey (1938–2016) – historian
- Anne Campbell (1940–) – Labour MP for Cambridge, 1992–2005; Chair of the Fabian Society
- Jean Bacon (1942–) – Professor of Computer Science at the University of Cambridge
- Paul Copley (1944–) – actor
- Marie Tidball (1984–) – Labour MP for Penistone and Stocksbridge (2024–)
- Katherine Brunt (1985–) – England Women's Cricketer
- Marc Roberts (1990–) – professional footballer
- John Stones (1994–) – England footballer
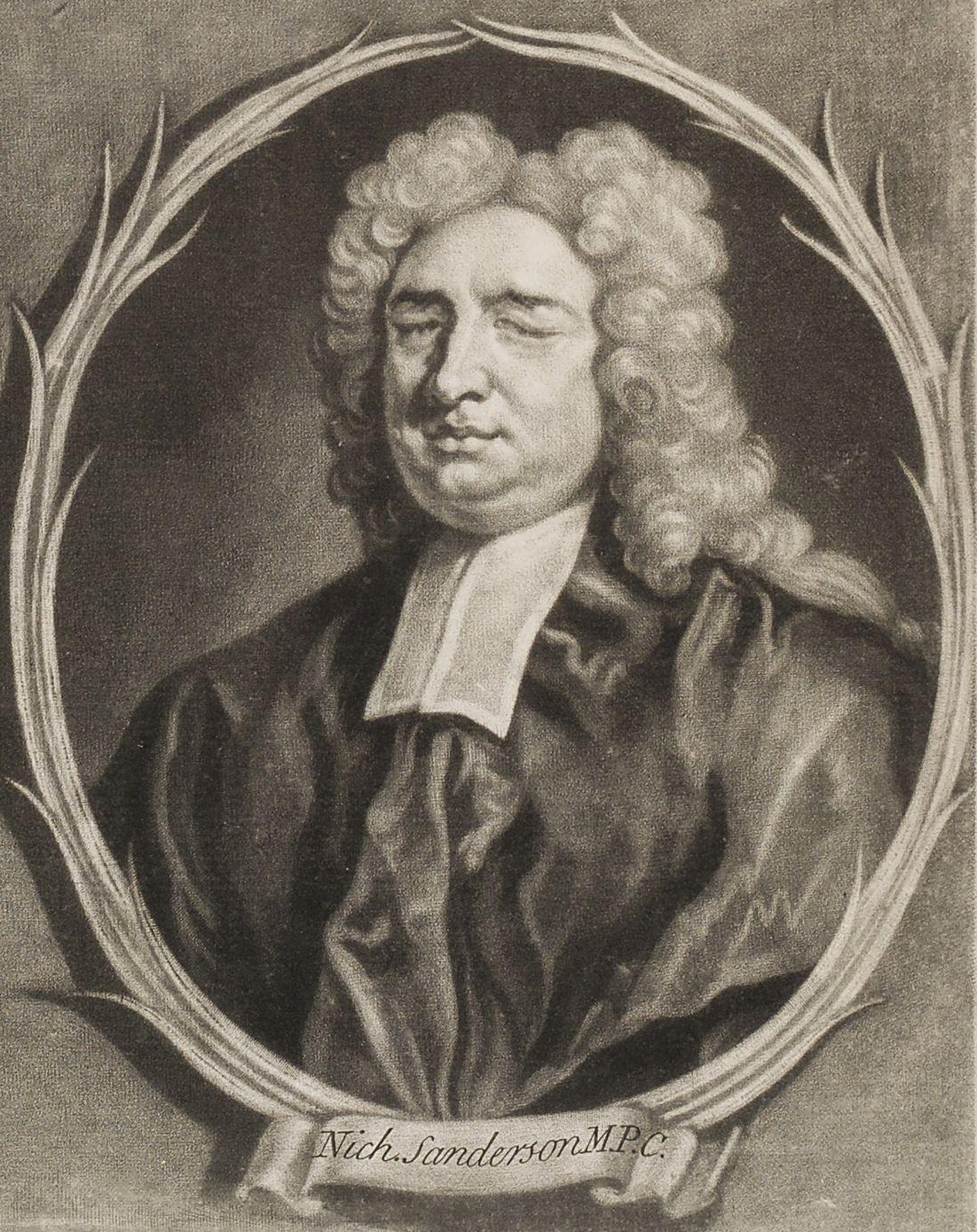
Nicholas Saunderson, mathematician

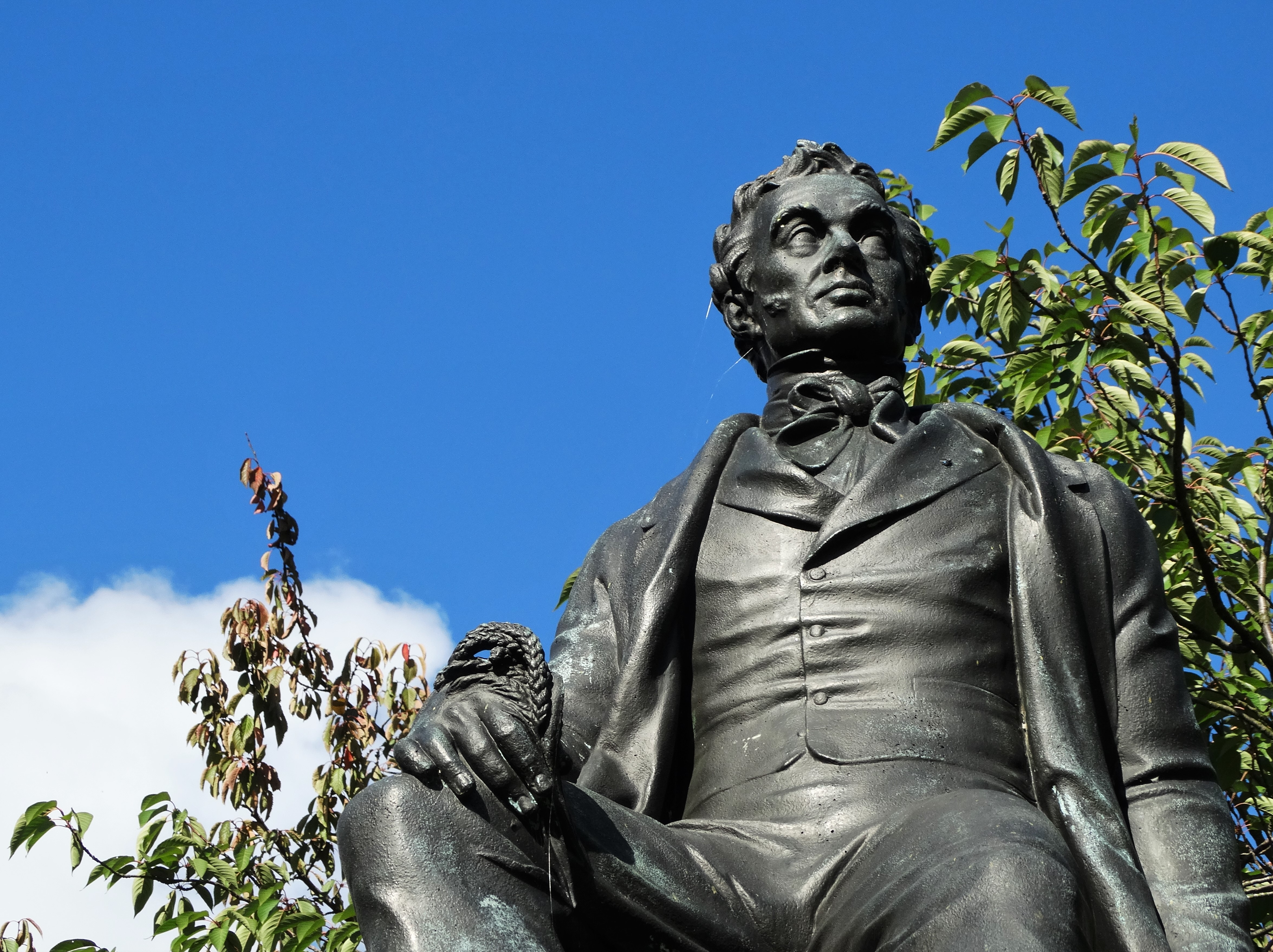
Statue of Ebenezer Elliott, poet

Alec Glassey, former Member of Parliament

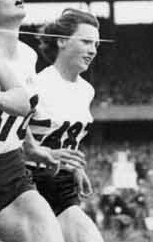
Heather Armitage, Olympian

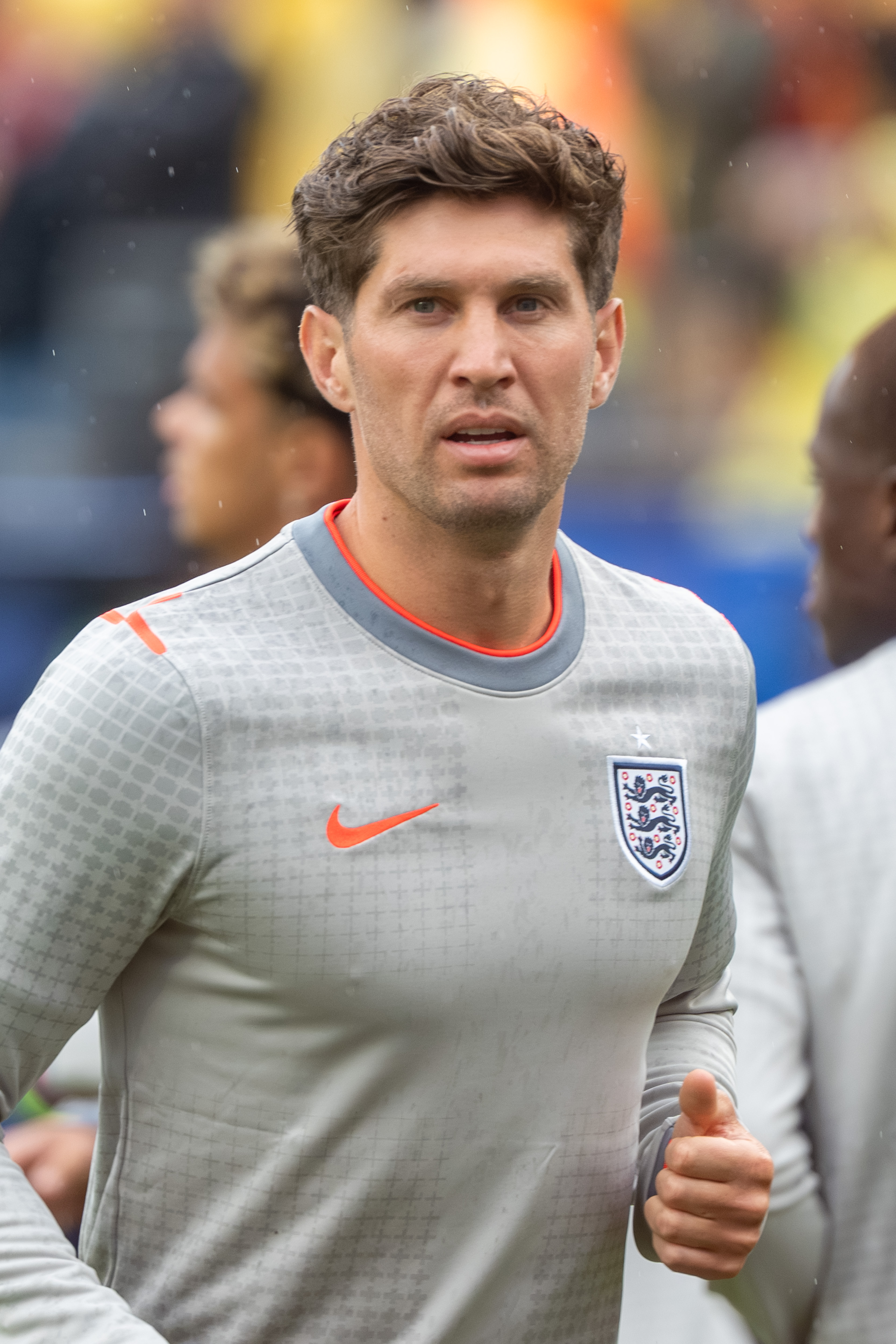
John Stones, footballer

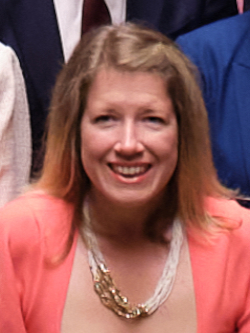
Dr Marie Tidball MP, politician

== See also ==
- List of the oldest schools in the United Kingdom
