= Noel Moore =

Noel Ernest Ackroyd Moore (25 November 1928 – 30 May 2008) was a British civil servant who was responsible for running the process leading to the decimalisation of the UK's currency in 1971. He was later principal of the Civil Service College.

== Early life ==
Born in Yorkshire, on 25 November 1928, Moore was the son of a monumental mason. Schooled at Penistone Grammar School, he went up to Gonville and Caius College, Cambridge on a scholarship to read modern languages, graduating in 1950. During his time at Cambridge he won a half-blue for chess, and developed what would be a lifelong interest in the history and culture of Europe. University was followed by National Service, a period in the ranks was followed by a commission as a second lieutenant in the Royal Army Educational Corps.

== Civil service ==
Moore entered the Post Office in 1952 in the grade of assistant principal. He initially retained an army commission in the Territorial Army, transferring to the Intelligence Corps on 26 November 1952. He was promoted to lieutenant on 16 February 1953, acting captain on 1 June 1954 and substantive captain on 25 November 1955. He transferred to the TA reserve of officers on 2 May 1956. He was promoted to the grade of principal in 1957.

Moore began his association with decimalisation in 1961 when he was appointed secretary to the British Committee of Inquiry on Decimal Currency, chaired by John Giffard, 3rd Earl of Halsbury. From 1966 he played the same role for the Decimal Currency Board, chaired by Lord Fiske, effectively giving him day-to-day responsibility for managing the transition to decimal currency. Despite the scale of the project, it encountered few problems, and the changeover was largely free from problems. His 1973 book, The Decimalisation of Britain’s Currency is considered the definitive account of the changeover.

With the successful conclusion of decimalisation, Moore transferred to the Civil Service Department in 1972, with the grade of under secretary. He was much concerned with improving management in the civil service, ultimately serving as principal of the Civil Service College in Sunningdale from 1981 to 1986.

== Retirement ==
Following Moore's retirement in 1986 he continued to be in demand as an advisor to the European Union on how to manage the transition to the Euro. He also advised the Bank of England for an exhibition marking 25 years since the introduction of the decimal currency. In 2000 he was interviewed for Funny Money, a documentary about decimalisation in Channel 4's Secret History series.

With his wife, Mary, whom he had married in 1954, he was a regular volunteer at an Oxfam shop in Brentwood. Mary died in January 2008. Moore died of a brain tumour on 30 May 2008, leaving two sons.
