= Penistone Paramount Cinema =

Coordinates: 53.5254°N 1.6281°W

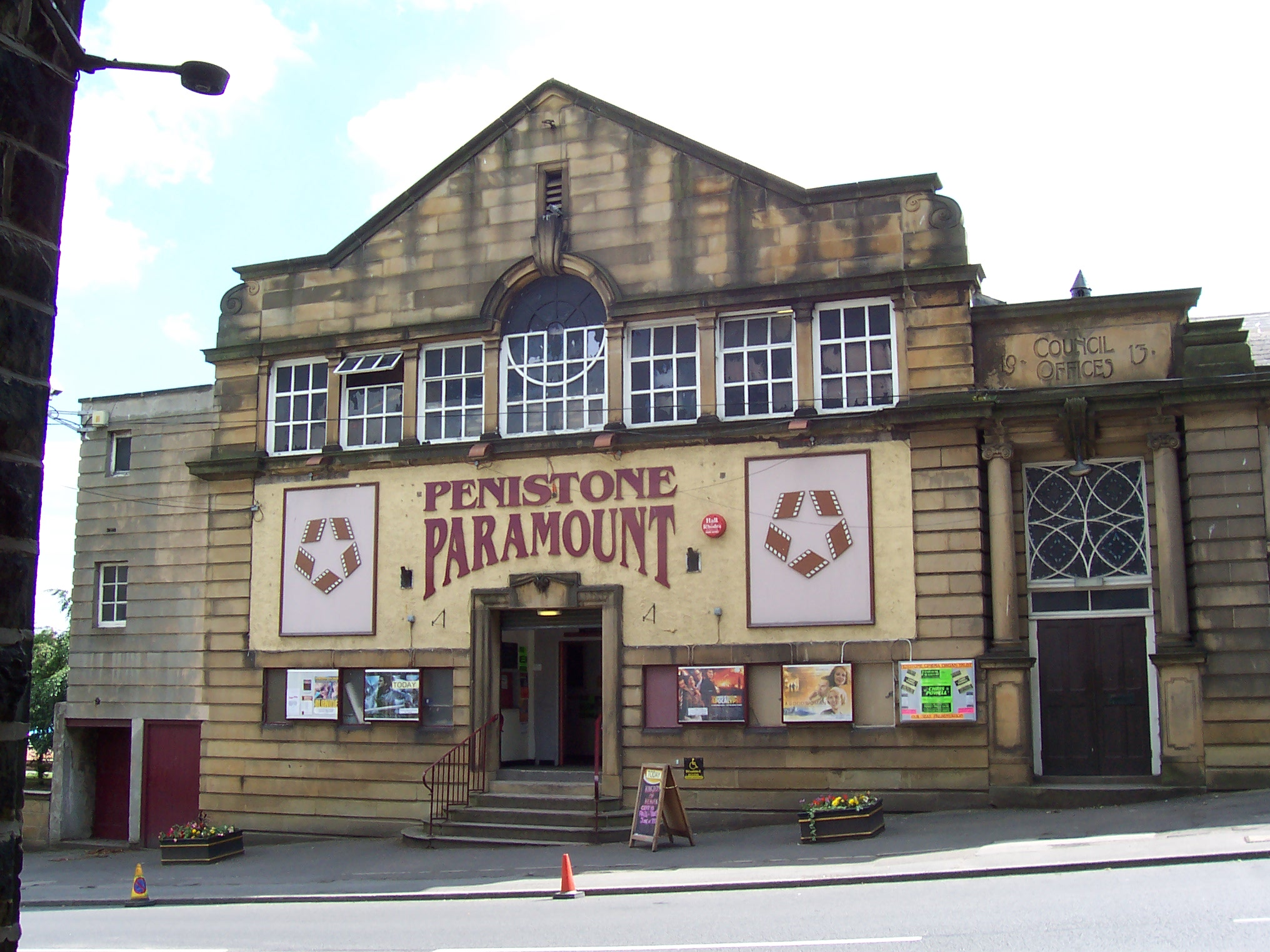
The cinema in Penistone

The Penistone Paramount Cinema is a community cinema and theatre in Shrewsbury Road in Penistone, near Barnsley, in the heart of the South Yorkshire Pennines. Besides the film releases, there are also live shows and monthly organ concerts.

== History ==
The Compton Organ

The building was commissioned as an assembly hall for the town and formed part of a larger complex including council offices and a library. It was designed by Henry R. Collins in the Art Deco style, built in brick and stone and was opened by the mayor of Huddersfield, Joseph Blamires, on 31 October 1914.

The design involved a rusticated main frontage facing onto Shrewsbury Road. It featured a doorcase with an architrave and a keystone. There was a row of seven windows on the first floor and an open pediment above. It became the Town Hall Picture House showing silent films on 20 November 1915. It proved successful, and with a balcony added in the 1920s, could seat 900 people. A stage and bar were added in the 1960s. In 1986, it was renamed as the Metro Cinema.

The Compton Organ was built by the John Compton Organ Company in London, for the Paramount Theatre in Birmingham, in 1937. The organ was removed from there, when the cinema was refurbished and made into a multiplex, in 1988. It was then transferred to the Regal in Oswestry, where it stayed until the cinema closed in 1994. It then went into storage for six years. In 2000 The Penistone Cinema Organ Trust purchased the organ, and all of the 1,000 pipes were cleaned out as part of the organ restoration. The trust then entered into an agreement with the council for the organ to be based in the cinema. The cinema was then renamed as the Paramount in honour of the new organ.

The building itself remains the property of Barnsley Metropolitan District Council, and is leased out to Penistone Town Council to keep it open as a cinema. The cinema was featured on the BBC Politics Show in January 2007 as an example of how a small provincial community cinema can survive. It was used as the cinema setting for episode 2 of the television series, Brief Encounters, in 2016, and it was refurbished at a cost of £100,000 in summer 2020.
