= Penistone FM =

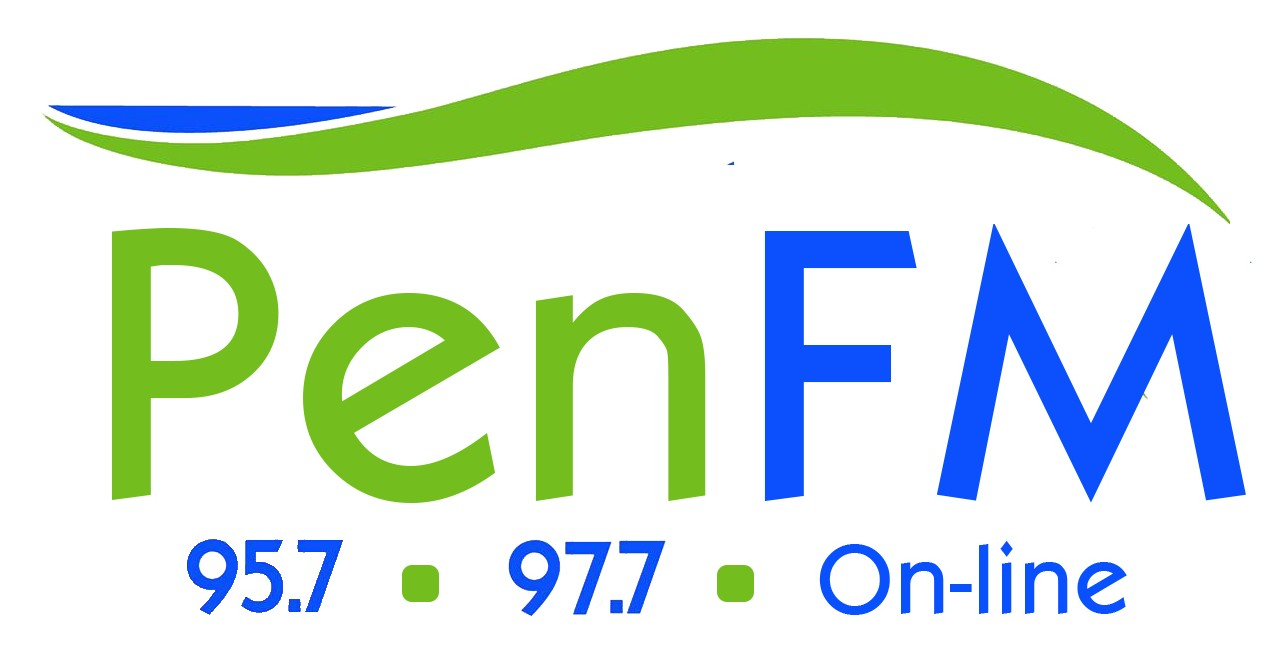

Penistone; United Kingdom
- Broadcast area: Penistone and Stocksbridge
- Frequencies: 95.7 and 97.7 MHz

Ownership
- Owner: Penistone Community Radio Limited

History
- First air date: 6 June 2009

Links
- Website: penistonefm.co.uk

Penistone FM or Pen FM is a community radio station based in Penistone, South Yorkshire, England, serving Penistone and Stocksbridge and broadcasting on FM and online.

== History ==
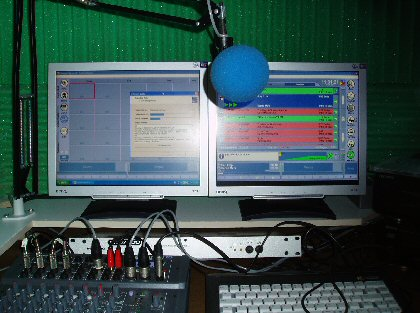
Penistone FM studio equipment in 2007

Penistone Community Radio was co-founded in 2005 by Martin Sugden. Trial broadcasts started in September 2006. The station was successfully granted its license by Ofcom in December 2007.

The official launch of Penistone FM occurred on Saturday 6 June 2009, broadcasting on 95.7 MHz. Its five-year contract was renewed in 2014.

As of 2016, the station has about forty volunteers.

Initially, the station was based at above a shop on the High Street. In 2015, the station moved its studios to a new base at Penistone 1 in the town centre.

In 2020, the station along with several other local ones came together for plans to apply for small-scale DAB transmissions across Sheffield and Rotherham. However their bid was failed and instead was granted to Shefcast Digital consisting of Link FM and Sheffield Live!.

In 2024, the station's five-year Ofcom contract was renewed to run until 2029.

== Transmission ==
The main transmitter, broadcasting at 95.7 MHz, is located on a hill near the village of Hoylandswaine, very close by a transmitter belonging to Dearne FM. The station could also be picked up in parts of Barnsley, Sheffield and other areas in the region, but lacked coverage in the Stocksbridge Valley due to geographical reasons. In August 2023, a second aerial based in Wortley was installed and began broadcasting on 97.7 MHz, covering Stocksbridge.

== Ventures ==
Penistone FM sponsored the Fox Valley Food Festival in 2024, a year after it started serving Stocksbridge.
