= Whitefaced Woodland =

Breed of sheep

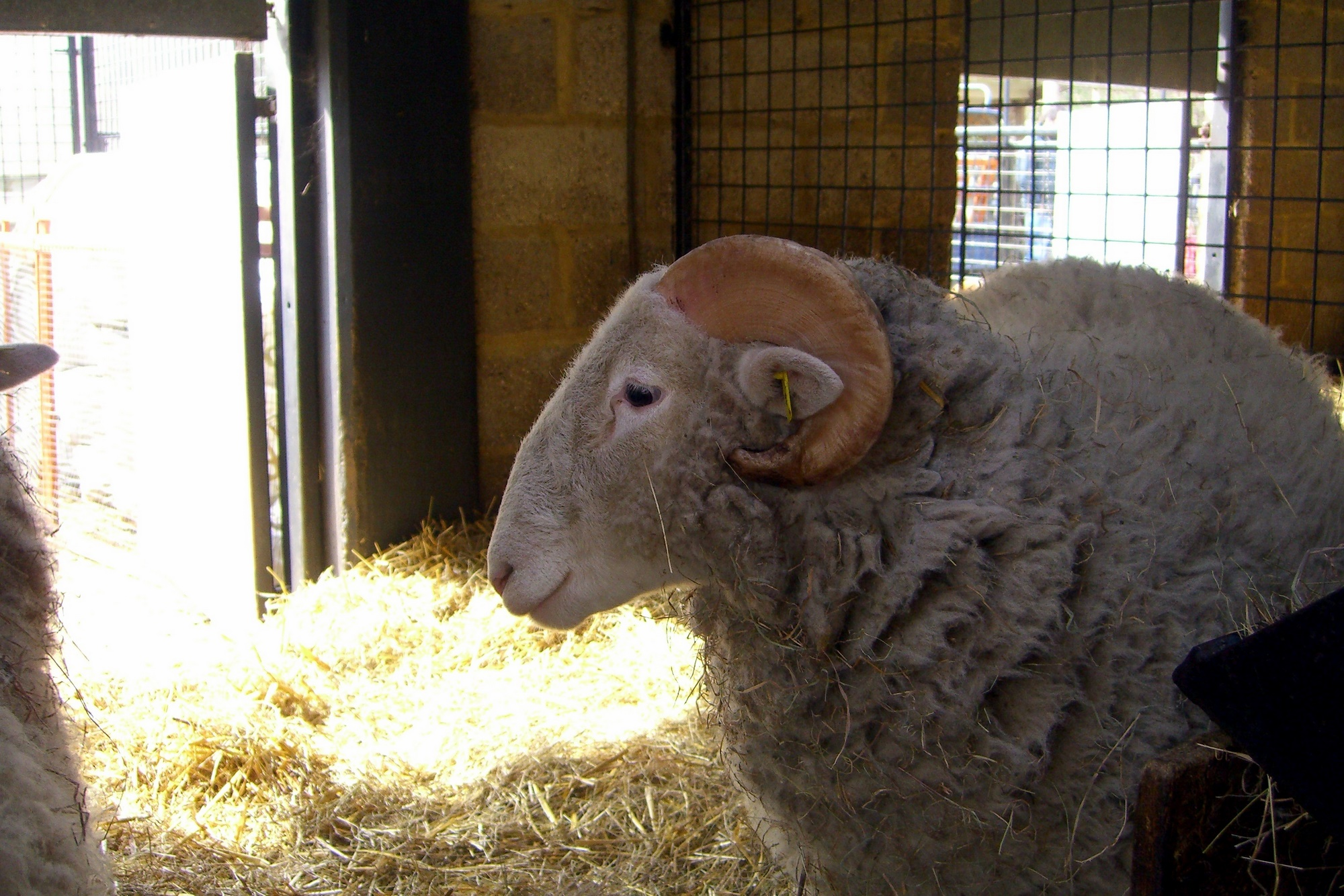
- Country of origin: England
- Wool colour: White

Whitefaced Woodland is a breed of sheep. It originated on the Pennine hills around the Woodland Valley, which links Derwent and Ladybower to the Snake Pass and Glossop. It is also known as Penistone sheep, after the Yorkshire town Penistone where sheep sales have been held since 1699. It is thought to be closely related to the Swaledale and the Lonk. The Whitefaced Woodland is listed as a priority breed by the Rare Breeds Survival Trust, a group that catalogues at-risk sheep breeds with small registered numbers.

== Breed Standard ==
The Whitefaced Woodland is one of the largest of the British hill breeds, strong-boned and robust with good conformation. Both sexes are horned, the male having heavily spiralling horns. The tail has a distinctive muscular appearance, and it is traditional to leave the rams’ tails long, but to dock the ewes’ tails somewhere between the legal minimum length and the hock. The wool is white and finer than that of many other hill breeds, the staple length being 15-20cm (6-8 inches) and the Bradford Count is 44-50, although the wool on the britch is coarser.

The head is strong and the face and muzzle are broad. The skin of the muzzle may be wholly or partly pink. The face is white, though very fine speckles are permitted on ewes. Black spots and black rings around the eyes are strongly discouraged. Eyes should be golden. The extreme Roman nose should be avoided. Horns should emerge flat from the back of the head and not appear goat-like. Slabbing of horns to prevent intrusion into the face is permissible. Extremely wide horns are discouraged and goat-like horns are not permitted.

The body should be heavy and deep with a broad, straight back. Narrow or angular shoulders are discouraged. Legs are strong boned and straight, with low pasterns strongly discouraged. Very light speckling on females is discouraged and no dark colouration is permitted on males.

The fleece is white, with no black or coloured wool permitted. Tufts of wool on the head are strongly discouraged, as are beards of coarse hair on the chest, especially of rams. A “tight jacket” which does not part down the sheep’s back is preferred, but fineness and quality of the fleece will be to some extent dependent on location of the sheep and on breeder preference.
