= Listed buildings in Penistone =

Penistone is a civil parish in the metropolitan borough of Barnsley, South Yorkshire, England. The parish contains 82 listed buildings that are recorded in the National Heritage List for England. Of these, one is listed at Grade I, the highest of the three grades, three are at Grade II*, the middle grade, and the others are at Grade II, the lowest grade. The parish contains the town of Penistone, the villages of Cubley, Hoylandswaine, Millhouse Green, and Thurlstone, and the surrounding countryside. Most of the listed buildings are houses, cottages and associated structures, farmhouses and farm buildings. The other listed buildings include churches and a chapel, items in a churchyard, and a former vicarage, a wayside cross, a boundary marker, a guide stoup, milestones, bridges, a railway viaduct, a former cloth hall, a former bank, a former nail workshop, coal drops, a war memorial, and a telephone kiosk.

== Key ==
Grade	Criteria
I	Buildings of exceptional interest, sometimes considered to be internationally important
II*	Particularly important buildings of more than special interest
II	Buildings of national importance and special interest

== Buildings ==
Name and location	Photograph	Date	Notes	Grade
St John's Church, Penistone; 53.52596°N 1.62960°W		Early 13th century	The church incorporates earlier material, and has been extended and altered, with the chancel and the south chapel dating from about 1300, and the tower from about 1500. The church is built in stone with a lead roof, and its external appearance is in Perpendicular style. It consists of a nave with a clerestory, north and south aisles, a south porch, a chancel with north and south chapels and a north vestry, and a west tower. The tower has three stages, diagonal buttresses, a large west door with a decorated moulded surround, and above it is a three-light window, clock faces, gargoyles, and an embattled parapet with crocketed pinnacles. The aisles are embattled, and the clerestory is also embattled and has pinnacles.	I
Greyhound stone 53.51197°N 1.65802°W		Medieval (probable)	A boundary marker set into a stone wall, it is in sandstone. The stone is rectangular, and contains an elliptical panel with a bas-relief carving of a running greyhound. Above it are later inscribed initials.	II
Wayside cross 53.51469°N 1.64848°W		Medieval (probable)	The remains of the cross are in millstone grit. They consist of a square base with chamfered scorners, and a cambered shaft with a square section. On the west side is inscribed the letter "T".	II
Cross and shaft 53.52576°N 1.62976°W		Late medieval (probable)	The cross base and shaft are in the churchyard of St John's Church, Penistone. They are in millstone grit, and the cross base is square with chamfered corners. The shaft is square, slightly cambered, and has housing at the top.	II
Cross base 53.52605°N 1.63004°W		Late medieval (possible)	The cross base is in the churchyard of St John's Church, Penistone. It is in millstone grit, and has corner spurs and a square socket.	II
Kidfield House and barn 53.54520°N 1.61906°W	—	Late medieval	The farmhouse and the adjoining barn, which dates probably from the 16th century, are timber framed, and were encased in stone in the 17th century. They have quoins and a stone slate roof, the house forming a cross-wing to the barn. The house has a chamfered plinth, two storeys and an attic, two bays, and chamfered gable copings on cut kneelers with apex finials. It contains a doorway with a moulded surround, imposts, a dated and initialled Tudor arched lintel, and decorated spandrels. The windows are mullioned with hood moulds. The barn has four internal bays, an outshut on the right, and it contains a large square-headed cart entry.	II
Barn east of Nether Mill House; 53.53113°N 1.63105°W	—	16th century (probable)	The barn is cruck framed, and was later encased in stone. It has a stone slate roof, five internal bays, and outshuts on the front. It contains cart entries and windows. Inside, there are three cruck trusses.	II
Barn west of Pinfold Farmhouse; 53.54049°N 1.60718°W	—	16th century (probable)	A cruck barn, encased in stone in the 17th century, and extended in the 18th century, it has quoins and a stone slate roof. There are three internal bays, and an additional bay to the right. The barn contains a central square-headed cart entrance with an oak lintel and a quoined surround, and there is an opposing square-headed cart entry. Inside, there are two cruck trusses.	II
Cat Hill Farmhouse; 53.54312°N 1.62748°W		1634	The farmhouse is in stone on a chamfered plinth, and has a stone slate roof with moulded gable copings, roll-top parapets, and finials. There are two storeys and attics, a three-bay front, and a rear kitchen wing with two bays. The middle bay is a two-storey gabled porch that has an elaborate doorway with a moulded surround, imposts, a deep shaped lintel and a hood mould. The outer bays are also gabled, and the windows are mullioned or mullioned and transomed. The kitchen wing is gabled and contains a Tudor arched doorway.	II*
Nether Mill House; 53.53098°N 1.63142°W	—	1636	A rendered farmhouse that was later extended, it has quoins, and a stone slate roof. There are two storeys, three bays at the front, and at the rear are a two-storey wing, a single-storey gabled wing, and an outshut. The central doorway has a chamfered and quoined surround, and a dated and initialled Tudor arched lintel, and the windows are mullioned.	II
26 and 28 Towngate, Thurlstone; 53.52955°N 1.64982°W	—	17th century	A pair of houses that were later altered, they are in stone, and have a stone slate roof with chamfered gable copings on moulded kneelers and shaped finials. There are two storeys, seven bays, and a gabled cross-wing on the left projecting at the rear. The windows are mullioned, including a ten-light window in the top floor. At the rear is an arched doorway in the middle bay.	II
Wall and gateway, Bullhouse Hall; 53.52053°N 1.68258°W		17th century	The front garden wall is in stone with roll-top coping. It contains a gateway flanked by panelled stone piers with moulded capitals. These support a lintel carrying a sculpted seated lion flanked by urns.	II
Carr Head Farmhouse; 53.54443°N 1.64084°W	—	17th century	The farmhouse is in stone, with quoins, and a stone slate roof with chamfered gable copings on moulded kneelers on the right. There are two storeys and two bays. Most of the windows are mullioned, there are some single lights, and most have hood moulds. On the right return is a 20th-century porch.	II
Ecklands Cottage; 53.51917°N 1.67485°W	—	17th century	The cottage is rendered, with quoins, and a stone slate roof with chamfered gable copings on moulded kneelers. There are two storeys and three bays. The central doorway has a plain surround and a decorative hood mould. The mullions have been removed from the windows, which are 20th-century casements.	II
Nether Lea Farmhouse and barn 53.54344°N 1.62748°W	—	17th century	The house and the barn, which dates from the 18th century on an earlier core, are in stone with stone slate roofs. The house has quoins, two storeys and an attic, and the front is gabled with a ball finial. The doorway is on the right, and the windows are mullioned. The barn is at right angles on the left, and has a segmental-arched cart entry, a stable door and a square pitching hole, and at the rear is a threshing door and smaller doorways. Between the house and the barn is a cruck frame.	II
Nook Farmhouse; 53.54005°N 1.60329°W	—	17th century	The farmhouse, which was extended to the rear in the 19th century, is in stone with quoins, and a stone slate roof with a chamfered gable coping to the left on a decorated kneeler. There are two storeys, three bays, and a rear extension. In the right gable end is a doorway with a cambered head, the windows are mullioned with some mullions removed, and there is a continuous hood mould over the ground floor openings.	II
Barn west of Royd Farmhouse; 53.53002°N 1.67416°W	—	17th century	The barn is in stone with quoins and a stone slate roof. There are two outshuts on the front, and probably five internal bays. The barn contains opposing square-headed cart entries.	II
Royd Moor Farmhouse; 53.53427°N 1.66675°W	—	17th century	The north part is the earliest, with the main part of the farmhouse dating from the early 18th century. It is in stone on a chamfered plinth, with quoins, and a stone slate roof with chamfered gable copings on moulded kneelers. There are two storeys and a T-shaped plan. Most of the windows are mullioned, some with hood moulds, and there is a single-light window with a round head. Most of the entrances have been altered.	II
Shore Hall Farmhouse and Stone Roof; 53.52140°N 1.66576°W	—	17th century	A house later altered and divided into two dwellings, they are in stone, with quoins, and a stone slate roof with chamfered gable copings on moulded kneelers on the right. There are two storeys, and an L-shaped plan, with the two dwellings linked at right angles by an arched, dated and initialled lintel. Most of the windows are mullioned, some with hood moulds.	II
Water Hall; 53.52979°N 1.62975°W	—	17th century	A house, later altered and divided, it is in stone, rendered on the right, and has a stone slate roof with chamfered gable copings on moulded kneelers. There are two storeys and attics, and a front of three gabled bays, the left bay lower and projecting. The doorway is in the centre, on the front most windows are sashes, and in the right two bays is a continuous hood mould on each floor. At the rear are three gables, a doorway, most of the windows are mullioned, and there is a round-headed stair window. The two right gable apices contain an octagonal window and a quatrefoil.	II
Bullhouse Hall and cottage 53.52068°N 1.68295°W	—	1655	A large house in stone on a chamfered plinth, with continuous hood moulds, and a Welsh slate roof with chamfered gable copings on cut kneelers, and finials. There are two storeys and attics, and four gabled bays, the second and fourth bays projecting. The main doorway is in the third bay, and has a moulded surround and imposts, and a decorative initialled and dated lintel. The windows are mullioned and transomed. The cottage is a projecting gabled wing on the left, and is rendered.	II*
2 Bullhouse; 53.52072°N 1.68311°W	—	1676	The front of the house was rebuilt later. The house is in stone with quoins and a stone slate roof. There are two storeys and three bays. In the centre is a Tudor arched doorway with a moulded surround, a dated and initialled lintel, and a hood mould. The windows on the front are sashes, and at the rear are cross windows and mullioned windows with hood moulds.	II
Summer House, Bullhouse Hall; 53.52108°N 1.68237°W	—	1686	The summer house is in stone, with quoins, modillion eaves brackets, and a hipped stone slate roof, with ball finials on the apex and at the corners. There is a single storey and a basement, a square plan, and a single bays. Steps lead up to a doorway with a moulded surround and a slightly arched dated lintel, over which is a continuous hood mould. Each of the other fronts contains a cross window.	II*
Bullhouse Lodge; 53.52132°N 1.68186°W	—	1687	The house was extended to the right in the late 18th century. It is in stone with quoins, and a stone slate roof with gable copings on moulded kneelers, chamfered on the left, and plain on the right. There are two storeys and five bays. The original doorway is partly blocked and has a slightly cambered initialled and dated lintel; to the right is a 20th-century doorway. Most of the windows are mullioned.	II
Stable range and cottage, Bullhouse Hall; 53.52055°N 1.68292°W	—	1688	The stable range attached to the left wing of the hall is in stone, and has a Welsh slate roof with gable copings on plain kneelers. On the front are two entrances with shallow segmental heads, a central Diocletian window, and two round arched windows with an oculus above. At the rear is a cottage with a Tudor arched entrance. In the left gable end is a doorway with a quoined surround and a dated and initialled lintel, two cross windows, and a continuous hood mould.	II
Royd Farmhouse; 53.52995°N 1.67363°W	—	1690	The farmhouse is in stone on a chamfered plinth, and has a stone slate roof with chamfered gable copings on cut kneelers, and a ball finial on the right apex. There are two storeys and an attic, seven bays, and a lean-to extension on the rear. In the fifth bay is a blocked doorway with a moulded surround and a deep dated lintel, and to the left are two inserted doorways. The windows are mullioned, and over the ground floor openings is a continuous hood mould, rising as a hood over the doorway.	II
Bullhouse Chapel and minister's house 53.52016°N 1.68272°W		1692	The chapel and the attached cottage, which is slightly later, are in stone with stone slate roofs. The chapel has a chamfered plinth, a single storey, a rectangular plan, a moulded eaves cornice, moulded gable copings on cut kneelers, and ball finials. The central gabled porch has an elliptical-headed entrance and a moulded surround, and the doorway has a shallow segmental head and a dated keystone. The cottage is attached at the rear on the right, and has two storeys.	II
Barn range east of Bullhouse Hall; 53.52067°N 1.68236°W	—	1695	A stone barn that has a roof of Welsh slate at the front, asbestos at the rear, chamfered gable copings on moulded kneelers, and apex finials. There are two storeys, an L-shaped plan, and eight internal bays. The barn contains two segmental-headed cart entries, four smaller entrances with quoined surrounds, two pitching holes, and chamfered slit vents.	II
1 Bullhouse; 53.52088°N 1.68269°W	—	17th or Early 18th century	An outbuilding, later a house, it is in stone, and has a Welsh slate roof with chamfered gable copings on moulded kneelers, and apex finials. There are two storeys, a doorway on the left with a cambered head, and an altered window to the right, and in the upper floor are two-light windows. On the front are two other doorways, one blocked, the other partly blocked and approached by steps. At the rear is a brick extension.	II
Jane Greaves graveslab 53.52590°N 1.62940°W	—	c. 1703	The graveslab is in the churchyard of St John's Church, and is to the memory of Jane Greaves. The slab has an elaborate centre panel with initials, the date and a motif in relief, and an inscription, and the border is carved with vines and scrolls.	II
Former stable building northwest of 2 Bullhouse; 53.52081°N 1.68322°W	—	Early 18th century (probable)	The former stable range is in stone with a stone slate roof, two storeys and four bays. The openings include four entrances with massive quoined surrounds, a cart entry with a segmental head, square windows, and slit vents.	II
Far Westhorpe Farmhouse; 53.53983°N 1.63341°W	—	Early 18th century	The farmhouse is in stone, rendered at the sides and rear, with quoins, and a tile roof with chamfered gable copings on moulded kneelers. There are two storeys, three bays, and a continuous single-storey rear outshut. The original doorway is partly blocked, and has a chamfered surround and a deep shaped lintel, and there is a 19th-century inserted doorway to the left. The windows are mullioned, with some mullions removed, and there is a continuous hood mould over the ground floor openings.	II
Barn west of Far Westhorpe Farmhouse; 53.53972°N 1.63393°W	—	Early 18th century	The barn is in stone, partly rendered, with an asbestos roof. There are four internal bays, and it contains square-headed cart entries, a chamfered entrance, and round-arched windows.	II
Nether Mill Farmhouse and Cottage; 53.53129°N 1.63118°W	—	Early 18th century	Two houses in stone, rendered at the rear, with a stone slate roof, and forming an L-shaped plan. They both have two storeys and three bays. The house has quoins, and a central doorway with a quoined surround and a deep lintel. The windows are mullioned, and there is a hood mould above the doorway and the window to its left. The cottage, projecting on the left, has a loading door on each floor of the gable end, a central porch, and mullioned windows.	II
Barn at Redminster Cottage; 53.52786°N 1.64888°W	—	Early 18th century	A stone barn with quoins and a stone slate roof. There are five internal bays, and continuous outshuts on both sides. In the centre of the front is a square-headed cart entry with a gabled red brick dovecote above. At the rear is a segmental-headed cart entry with a quoined surround, and in the right return is an entrance with a quoined surround.	II
Bank House Farmhouse; 53.52073°N 1.66012°W	—	1727	The house is in stone with a floor band and a tile roof. There are two storeys and three bays. The windows are mullioned, with some mullions removed. On the front is an initialled and dated plaque, and on the right return is a porch.	II
8 Market Street; 53.52594°N 1.63086°W	—	Early to mid 18th century	A shop in stone, with a floor band, a coved eaves cornice, and a stone slate roof with chamfered gable copings on moulded kneelers. There are three storeys and one bay. In the ground floor is a passage doorway with a deep lintel on the right, and a shop front to the left. The middle floor contains a sash window, and to the left is a blocked part of a transomed window. In the top floor is a former two-light window with the mullion removed, and a blocked window to the left. At the rear, the passage entry has a moulded surround.	II
Milestone near Netherfield Chapel; 53.53140°N 1.63562°W		Early to mid 18th century (probable)	The milestone is set into a wall on the west side of Huddersfield Road (B6462 road). It is a pillar with a square head, and is inscribed with the distances to London, Huddersfield, and Penistone.	II
Milestone near Cliffe Kennels; 53.53525°N 1.60904°W		1736	The milestone is on the north side of Barnsley Road (A628 road). It is a post with a roughly rounded top, and inscriptions that are partly obliterated.	II
5 and 7 Market Street; 53.52584°N 1.63055°W		Mid 18th century	A house with shops in stone, with floor bands, coved and moulded eaves cornices, and roofs of stone slate and tile with gable copings on moulded kneelers. There are three storeys, No. 5 has two bays, and No. 7 projects with one bay. In the ground floor are shop fronts, and the upper floors contain sash windows. On the front of No. 5 is a quoined entrance and a reset datestone. In the left return is a blocked arcade with three columns and a corner pier, all with capitals.	II
Barn south of Cat Hill Farmhouse; 53.54330°N 1.62714°W	—	Mid 18th century	The barn is in stone with quoins and a stone slate roof. It contains a central cart entry with an oak lintel, and other openings with quoined surrounds.	II
Boulder Bridge; 53.52593°N 1.61423°W		18th century (probable)	A footbridge over the River Don, it is in stone, and consists of a single depressed segmental arch. The bridge has stone parapets with flat copings, splayed ends, and a flat, flagged causeway.	II
Milestone, Barnsley Road; 53.53202°N 1.62772°W		18th century	The milestone is on the southeast side of Barnsley Road (A628 road). It consists of a stone pillar with a rounded top, and is inscribed with the distances to Manchester and Barnsley.	II
Milestone in churchyard wall 53.52614°N 1.62869°W		18th century	The milestone is built into the north wall of the churchyard of St John's Church, Penistone. It has a rounded top and flat faces, and the front is inscribed with the distance to Sheffield. Also on the front is a benchmark.	II
Milestone, High Bank Lane; 53.53245°N 1.67359°W		18th century	The milestone is on the southwest side of the lane, a former packhorse route. It consists of a flat-topped pillar with a partly obliterated inscription.	II
Robert Martin graveslab 53.52588°N 1.62973°W	—	1755	The graveslab is in the churchyard of St John's Church, Penistone, and is to the memory of two members of the Martin family. It is in stone, and has incised scroll decoration around the edge.	II
1 and 3 Market Street; 53.52597°N 1.63051°W		1763	A cloth hall, later converted into shops, originally with a U-shaped plan, it was infilled in the early 19th century. The building is in stone on a plinth, with rusticated quoins, and a hipped stone slate roof, glazed in the centre. There are two storeys, four bays at the front and seven along the sides. On the front, the two middle bays are recessed under an open modillion pediment with a parapet and acroteria. In the ground floor is a modern shop front, and a sash window above. The outer bays contain archivolted round-arched shop windows and sash windows above. Along the sides are round-arched windows in the ground floor and sashes above, and at the rear the middle bay projects under an open pediment, there are round-arched openings in the ground floor, and casement windows above.	II
8 and 10 Thurlstone Road; 53.52899°N 1.63456°W	—	Mid to late 18th century	A pair of stone cottages with quoins and a stone slate roof. There are two storeys, each cottage has one bay, and there is a rear outshut. The doorways are on the left, each with a deep lintel and a massive quoined surround. The windows are sashes on the left, and casements on the right.	II
Cross Royd Head Farmhouse and barn 53.52242°N 1.65456°W	—	Mid to late 18th century	A laithe house, it is in stone, with quoins, and a stone slate roof with chamfered gable copings on moulded kneelers. There are two storeys, the house has two bays and the barn has three. The house has two entrances, one blocked and the other with a porch, and the windows are mullioned. The barn has a cart entry with a stone lintel, partly blocked with brickwork to give a segmental-arched head, a small door to the right, and two square pitching holes.	II
1–9 Tenter Hill, Thurlstone; 53.52800°N 1.64717°W	—	Late 18th century	A row of five stone houses with quoins and a stone slate roof. There are three storeys, and each house has one bay. The windows either have single lights, or multiple lights with mullions, including one with 13 lights, some of which are blocked.	II
Bank House; 53.52242°N 1.65957°W	—	Late 18th century	A stone farmhouse with quoins and a roof with tiles at the front and stone slate at the rear. There are two storeys, two bays, and a rear outshut. In the centre is a doorway with a quoined surround and a deep lintel The windows are mullioned, with some mullions removed, and include a ten-light window in the upper floor.	II
Guide stoup 53.51264°N 1.66329°W	—	Late 18th century (probable)	The guide stoup is used as a gatepost, and is in millstone grit. It is a square post inscribed on three sides with pointing hands and the distances to nearby towns.	II
Kirkwood Farmhouse and farmbuildings 53.52173°N 1.61244°W	—	Late 18th century	The farmhouse and attached barn are in stone, the house with a stone slate roof, the barn with a Welsh slate roof, and both with two storeys. The house has two bays, quoins, a central doorway with a quoined surround, mullioned windows, and gable copings with cut kneelers on the right. The barn is at right angles, and contains a segmental-headed cart entry with a dated keystone, five stable doors, and two pitching holes.	II
Old Cubley; 53.51261°N 1.63164°W	—	Late 18th century	A pair of weavers' cottages in stone with quoins and a tile roof. There are three storeys and each cottage has one bay. In the centre, each cottage has a gabled porch, and the windows are mullioned, with some mullions removed, and some windows altered.	II
Redminster House; 53.52811°N 1.64858°W	—	Late 18th century	A house that was extended to the left in the 19th century, it is in stone on a plinth, with rusticated quoins, and a stone slate roof with gable coping on cut kneelers. There are three storeys and a T-shaped plan, with a front range of four bays, a rear wing, and an outshut on the left. The doorway has an architrave, a pulvinated frieze, and a triangular pediment. The windows on the front are sashes with architraves and keystones, and in the left extension are mullioned windows.	II
Carr House; 53.53213°N 1.67988°W	—	1782	Two houses later combined into one, it is in stone with quoins, and a tile roof with moulded kneelers. There are two storeys and three bays. The doorway on the front has a quoined surround and a deep lintel, and the windows are mullioned. In the left return is a reset doorway with an inscribed and dated lintel.	II
Barns north of Royd Moor Farmhouse; 53.53450°N 1.66703°W	—	1785	A barn and stable range, the stables slightly later, they are in stone with quoins, a stone slate roof, and they form an L-shaped plan. The barn contains a segmental-headed cart entry with a quoined surround and a dated and initialled keystone. To the right are two cart entries with a common jamb, and windows above. In the stable range are three entrances with quoined surrounds and deep lintels, and square pitching holes.	II
Two cottages, Royd Field; 53.51430°N 1.62749°W	—	c.1800	A pair of mirror-image cottages in stone, with quoins, and a Welsh slate roof with gable copings on moulded kneelers. There are two storeys, each cottage has one bay, at the rear is a continuous outshut, and on the right return is a small rendered gabled extension. The doorways are in the centre and have common jambs and deep lintels, and the windows are mullioned with three lights.	II
15, 17 and 19 Towngate, Thurlstone; 53.52897°N 1.64929°W	—	Late 18th or early 19th century	A row of weavers' houses, later three dwellings, they are in stone with quoins and a Welsh slate roof. No. 15 faces the road, and has a central doorway with a quoined surround, and single-light or mullioned windows. The other houses have rear doorways, and to the left is a passage entry. At the rear, Nos. 17 and 19 have doorways, No. 19 with a quoined surround. The windows are mullioned with some blocked lights, including a continuous 13-light window in the top floor.	II
Hillside; 53.52059°N 1.65981°W	—	Late 18th or early 19th century	Two houses, later combined into one, it is in stone with quoins and a stone slate roof. There are two storeys, three bays, and a later two-storey flat-roofed extension to the rear. The two entrances have quoined surrounds and deep lintels, and the windows are mullioned.	II
Weaver's house, Leapings; 53.52437°N 1.65683°W	—	Late 18th or early 19th century	The weaver's house is in stone with quoins and a stone slate roof. There are three storeys, three bays, and an outshut on the left. In the centre is a doorway, and flanking it are sash windows. In each of the upper floors is a continuous ten-light window, with some lights blocked.	II
104 and 106 High Street; 53.52204°N 1.63145°W		Early 19th century	A pair of houses in stone that have a stone slate roof with gable coping on a cut kneeler to the right. There are three storeys, and each house has one bay. The doorways are on the right and have quoined surrounds and deep lintels, and the windows are mullioned, with three lights in the ground floor and four in the upper floors. At the rear are paired lights.	II
9 Ingbirchworth Road, Thurlstone; 53.52989°N 1.65016°W	—	Early to mid 19th century	A weaver's house at the end of a row, it is in stone with a stone slate roof. There are three storeys and two bays. In the centre is a doorway with a quoined surround, the left bay contains single-light windows, and in the right bay are two-light mullioned windows. At the rear is a continuous nine-light window in the top floor, and in the left return are two blocked taking-in doors and the remains of stone stairs.	II
4 Rock Side, Thurlstone; 53.52719°N 1.64587°W	—	Early to mid 19th century	A pair of houses, later combined, the building is in stone, with a sill band, and a stone slate roof with a coped gable on the left. There are three storeys and three bays. On the front are two doorways, and in the lower two floors are sash windows. The top floor contains a continuous nine-light window.	II
Milestone near Fulshaw Cross; 53.51200°N 1.68341°W		Early to mid 19th century	The milestone is on the east side of Manchester Road (A628 road). It consists of a stone post with a rounded top, inscribed with the distances to Barnsley and to Manchester.	II
Milestone, Huddersfield Road; 53.53438°N 1.63719°W		Early to mid 19th century	The milestone is on the west side of Huddersfield Road (B6462 road). It consists of a stone post with a triangular section and a rounded top. The milestone is inscribed with the distances to Penistone and to Huddersfield.	II
Milestone opposite Towngate; 53.52746°N 1.64900°W		Early to mid 19th century	The milestone is on the south side of Manchester Road (A628 road). It is a flat-faced stone with a rounded top, and is inscribed with the distances to Barnsley and Manchester.	II
Milestone opposite 351 Manchester Road; 53.52428°N 1.67299°W		Early to mid 19th century	The milestone is on the southeast side of Manchester Road (A628 road). It is a flat-faced stone with a rounded top, and is inscribed with the distances to Barnsley and Manchester.	II
Former nailshop 53.53888°N 1.60144°W		Early to mid 19th century	The former nailmakers' workshops are in stone with a stone slate roof. There is one storey, and three cells. It contains various openings.	II
44, 46 and 48 Manchester Road and 2 Watering Place Road, Thurlstone; 53.52724°N 1.64979°W		Mid 19th century	A row of stone houses with a sill band, a moulded eaves cornice, and a Welsh slate roof with coped gables. There are two storeys at the front and four at the rear, a front of five bays, and a single-storey extension on the left. The middle three bays are symmetrical and contain a doorway with pilaster jambs and an ornamental lintel, flanked by windows, with a cornice over all. Above the doorway is a round-arched window, and most of the other windows are sashes. In each gable is a round-arched window.	II
Coal drops 53.52670°N 1.63292°W		Mid 19th century	The coal drops are in stone, and consist of six segmental-arched openings. They have imposts, a cornice, a blocking course, and keystones. There are wooden supporting beams for shutes across each opening.	II
Lamp standard 53.52586°N 1.62963°W	—	Mid 19th century	The lamp standard is by the porch of St John's Church, Penistone. It is in cast iron, and has a moulded octagonal stone base, a moulded fluted standard on four legs, and an octagonal lamp base.	II
Starling Bridge; 53.52292°N 1.66844°W		Mid 19th century	The bridge carries Birks Lane over the River Don. It is in stone, and consists of a single segmental arch. The bridge has pilaster buttresses on each side of the arch, parapets with massive grooved copings, and end piers with gadrooned corner bollards.	II
Penistone Bridge; 53.52910°N 1.63399°W		1866	The rebuilding of an earlier bridge, it was widened in 1915, and carries the A628 road over the River Don. The bridge is in stone, and consists of two segmental arches with a central triangular cutwater. It has pilaster buttresses, a band at the base of a coped parapet, and a plaque on the parapet.	II
St John's Church, Hoylandswaine; 53.54307°N 1.60946°W		1869	The church was designed by W. H. Crossland in Decorated style. It is built in stone with a slate roof, and consists of a nave, a north lean-to aisle, a south porch, a chancel with a north vestry, and a west tower. The tower has three stages, angle buttresses, a three-light west window, a stair tower on the south, a clock face, gabled merlons, and crocketed corner pinnacles.	II
Bridge, Water Hall Lane; 53.52971°N 1.62869°W		Late 19th century	A footbridge over the River Don, leading from Water Hall Lane to Watermeadows Park. It is in stone and consists of a single deep segmental arch with coped parapets.	II
Penistone Viaduct; 53.52809°N 1.62384°W		1885	The viaduct was built to carry the Penistone to Denby Dale railway line over the valley of the River Don. It is curved, about 1,100 feet (340 m) long, and rises 98 feet (30 m) above the river. The viaduct consists of 28 round arches, and an additional arch over the road at the south end, and it has a string course at the base of the parapet.	II
Former Midland Bank; 53.52619°N 1.63025°W		1894–95	The former bank, shops and offices are on a corner site, and are in stone, with moulded cornices between the floors, and a Westmorland slate roof. There are two storeys and an attic, and a curving front of ten bays. All the openings have elliptical-arched heads. In the centre is a doorway with a moulded surround, flanked by large shop windows with decorated spandrels. The doorway in the left bay has pilaster jambs, a pulvinated frieze, and a triangular pediment. The outer bays on each front have shaped gables and finials, and in the roof are three gabled dormers.	II
St Saviour's Church, Thurlstone; 53.52673°N 1.65848°W		1904–05	The church, which was designed by C. Hodgson Fowler, is in stone with a west wall in brick, a Welsh slate roof, and the aisle roofs in lead. It consists of a nave, a west porch, lean-to north and south aisles, and a chancel with a north vestry. The planned west tower was not built. On the west gable is a wooden bellcote. The windows in the aisles and chancel contain Decorated tracery, and the west window has three lights and Perpendicular tracery.	II
Vicarage, St Saviour's Church; 53.52655°N 1.65915°W	—	1906	The former vicarage was designed by Edgar Wood, and is in stone with a stone slate roof. There are two storeys at the front and three at the rear, and a front of three bays. The doorway is recessed, with splayed jambs, and a deep lintel. Over the doorway is a panel with two small lights and the date, and to the right is a canted bay window. The other windows are mullioned, some with transoms. At the rear and on the left return are three-storey canted bay windows, each with a coped gable.	II
Penistone War Memorial; 53.52602°N 1.63016°W		c. 1924	The war memorial forms part of the western wall of the churchyard of St John's Church, Penistone, and was designed by John Alfred Gotch. It is in sandstone, and consists of a Latin cross on a square tapering chamfered shaft 6 metres (20 ft) high. The shaft is on a moulded plinth, on a lower square plinth with angled wings and moulded capping. The lower plinth is on a semicircular and half-hexagonal base of three steps. On the lower plinth are slate panels with inscriptions, and the names of those lost in the two World Wars. The memorial is enclosed by a curving and half-coped wall ending in square panelled piers with square caps.	II
Telephone kiosk 53.52575°N 1.62998°W		1935	The telephone kiosk is near St John's Church, Penistone and is of the K6 type, designed by Giles Gilbert Scott. Constructed in cast iron with a square plan and a dome, it has three unperforated crowns in the top panels.	II
