= Alan Mercer =

- Born: 22 August 1931; Stocksbridge, West Riding of Yorkshire, England
- Died: 9 July 2014 (aged 82); Lancaster, Lancashire, England
- Scientific career
- Fields: Operational Research
- Workplaces: University of Lancaster

Alan Mercer (22 August 1931 – 9 July 2014) was a British professor of operational research (OR) at Lancaster University until his retirement in 1998. Mercer was one of the founding members of the Department of Operational Research at Lancaster in 1964, the first such department in Britain. He was also a founding editor of the European Journal of Operational Research (EJOR) in 1975, resigning from editing in 1998.

== Early life and career ==
Mercer was born in Stocksbridge, West Riding of Yorkshire, in 1931 and attended Penistone Grammar School before being offered an open scholarship to study mathematics at Sidney Sussex College, Cambridge. He then went on to join the Field Investigation Group of the National Coal Board in 1954, moving to the Theoretical Physics Division at the Atomic Weapons Research Establishment at Aldermaston in 1956. It was here that Mercer was one of a small team directly responsible for Britain's first hydrogen bomb. He also continued working in operational research (OR), taking over work by atomic spy Klaus Fuchs on stochastic processes after his arrest.

During this time he researched his PhD at Birkbeck, University of London, advised by David Cox. Shortly after being awarded his PhD in 1961, Mercer left Aldermaston to join Armour & Co. Ltd as the senior manager responsible for OR, statistics and data.

In 1964 Mercer was appointed to the Department of Operational Research at the newly established Lancaster University, with the first students arriving October 1964. He wanted a strong connection between the Department and industry; he persuaded Allied Breweries to start its own OR group with Lancaster's first PhD as its head after Mercer installed state-of-the-art quality control in its Burton-on-Trent brewery through his first private consultancy. Mercer continued to play a major role in OR, serving on the Council of the Operational Research Society from 1969 and being a founding editor of the European Journal of Operational Research (EJOR) from 1975. He also advised the Turkish government in the early 1970s on the introduction of OR to that country, and made regular trips to the Middle East Technical University campus in Ankara. In 1982 he was appointed for three years as Chairman of Lancaster's School of Management and Organisational Sciences, and set about integrating the departments into the Lancaster University Management School. He was the Head of Department from 1983 to 1992 after the sudden death of his predecessor, Mike Simpson, in July 1983.

Mercer retired in 1998, but continued to supervise his PhD students and give MSc lectures, whist also chairing most of the Department of Management Science PhD vivas for an additional 10 years.

== Personal life ==
Mercer met Iris Pigott in January 1950 at Sidney Sussex College, Cambridge, having both studied at Penistone Grammar School. They married in 1954 and had two sons, Nicholas and Jonathan.
