= Royd Moor Wind Farm =

Wind farm in Yorkshire, England

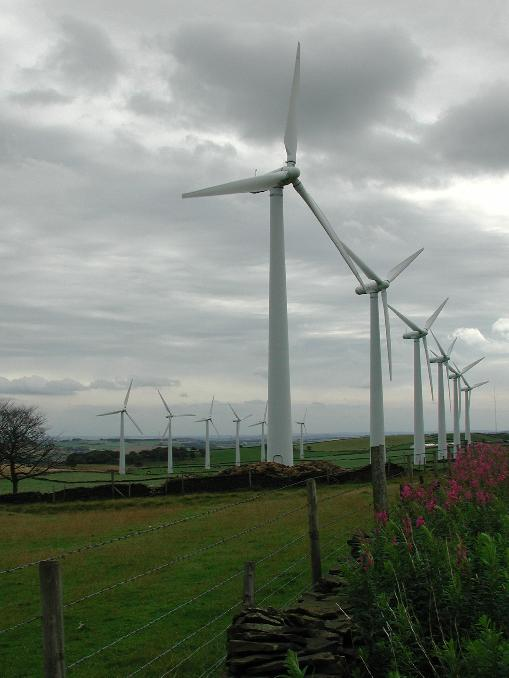
- Country: England
- Location: 6 km west of Penistone, Barnsley South Yorkshire
- Coordinates: 53°32′15″N 1°41′18″W
- Commission date: 1993
- Owner: E.ON

Power generation
- Units operational: 13 AN Bonus 450/37 turbines
- Nameplate capacity: 6 MW

External links
- Commons: Related media on Commons

The Royd Moor Wind Farm is located at Penistone, Barnsley, South Yorkshire, England, and consists of thirteen 450 kW turbines. The site is located approximately 6 kilometres (3.7 mi) north west of Penistone, above the A628 trunk road between Barnsley and Manchester. The turbines are set in two parallel, staggered rows of six and seven, on a ridge in hilly fell land lying 320 metres (1,050 ft) above sea level.

These turbines were completed in 1993 and are 35 metres (115 ft) in height to the hub and have a rotor diameter of 37 metres (121 ft). The maximum output is 6 mW, equivalent to the annual energy required to power 3,300 homes.

The original planning application was for a 25-year operation but an extension until the end of 2027 was granted in 2021.
