= Nicholas Saunderson =

English mathematician and scientist (1682–1739)

Nicholas Saunderson FRS
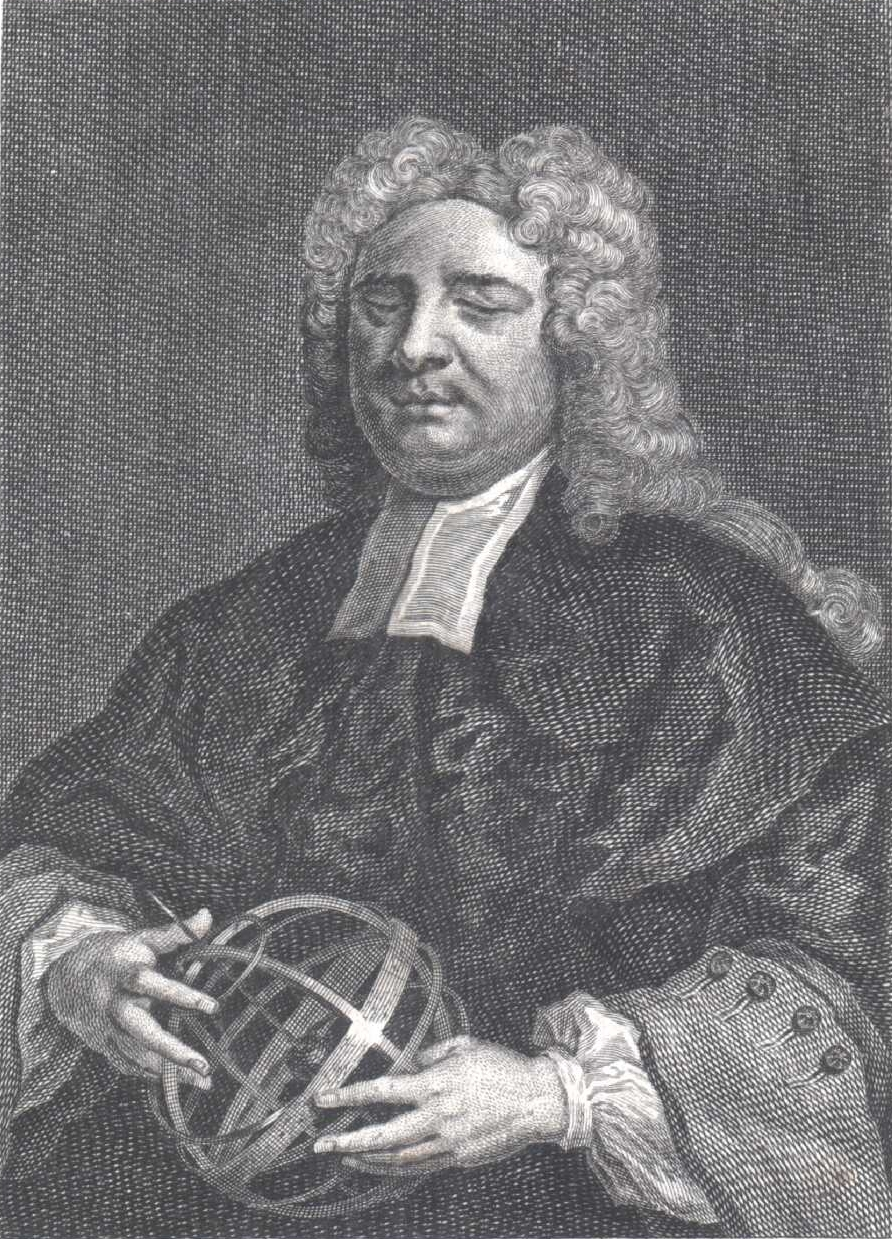
- Born: 20 January 1682; Thurlstone, Yorkshire, England
- Died: 19 April 1739 (aged 57); Cambridge, England
- Education: Penistone Grammar School; University of Cambridge
- Spouse: Abigail Dickons
- Children: 2
- Awards: Fellow of the Royal Society (1718)
- Scientific career
- Fields: Mathematics
- Workplaces: University of Cambridge

Nicholas Saunderson (20 January 1682 – 19 April 1739) was a blind English scientist and mathematician. According to one historian of statistics, he may have been the earliest discoverer of Bayes' theorem. He worked as Lucasian Professor of Mathematics at Cambridge University, a post also held by Isaac Newton, Charles Babbage and Stephen Hawking.

== Biography ==
Saunderson was born at Thurlstone, Yorkshire, in January 1682. His parents were John and Ann Sanderson (or Saunderson), and his father made a living as an excise man. When he was about a year old, he lost his sight through smallpox; but this did not prevent him from learning arithmetic through assisting his father. As a child, he is also thought to have learnt to read by tracing the engravings on tombstones around St John the Baptist Church in Penistone with his fingers. His early education was at the free school, Penistone Grammar School where he learnt French, Latin and Greek, taught by then-headmaster Nathan Staniforth. In 1700 a tutor taught him algebra and geometry, and in 1702 he attended Attercliffe Academy, near Sheffield, for logic and metaphysics. He was introduced to Cambridge via meetings with the local gentry at Underbank Hall, near Penistone.

In 1707, he arrived in Cambridge with his friend Joshua Dunn from Attercliffe Academy, a fellow-commoner at Christ's College. During this time, he resided in Christ's and could make use of the library but was not admitted to the university. He wanted to teach and with the permission of the Lucasian professor, William Whiston, Saunderson was allowed to teach, lecturing on mathematics, astronomy and optics. His teaching was highly appreciated.

Whiston was expelled from his chair on 30 October 1710; at the appeal of the heads of colleges, Queen Anne awarded Saunderson a Master of Arts degree on 19 November 1711 so that he would be eligible to succeed Whiston as Lucasian professor. He was chosen as the fourth Lucasian professor the next day, defeating the Trinity College candidate Christopher Hussey, backed by Richard Bentley, when the electors split 6 to 4 in his favour. On 6 November 1718 Saunderson was elected a fellow of the Royal Society. He was also a member of the Spitalfields Mathematical Society.

He was resident at Christ's College until 1723 when he married Abigail Dickons, daughter of William Dickons who was the rector of Boxworth, Cambridgeshire. They lived in Cambridge with their children John and Anne. He was created doctor of laws in 1728 by command of George II during a visit by the monarch to Cambridge. He died of scurvy, on 19 April 1739 and was buried in the chancel of the parish church at Boxworth near Cambridge.

Saunderson possessed the friendship of leading mathematicians of the time: Isaac Newton, Edmond Halley, Abraham De Moivre and Roger Cotes. His senses of hearing and touch were acute, and he was a good flautist. He could carry out mentally long and intricate mathematical calculations. He devised a calculating machine or abacus, by which he could perform arithmetical and algebraic operations by the sense of touch; it was known as his "palpable arithmetic", and was described in his Elements of Algebra. This book was prepared during the last six years of his life but published posthumously in 1740 by his widow and children aided by John Colson, the next Lucasian professor. This was used at the Royal Military Academy at Woolwich.

Another of his writings, prepared for his pupils, was published in 1751 as The Method of Fluxions applied to a select number of useful problems, together with … an explanation of the principal propositions of Sir Isaac Newton's philosophy.

== Mathematics ==
His importance was as a charismatic and skilled teacher at exactly the time when mathematics started to become important at University of Cambridge. Part of Saunderson's role as the Lucasian professor was to disseminate the Principia Mathematica so that it was accessible to undergraduates and college tutors. Ultimately through his teaching during his term in office, he reformed the decaying, traditional curriculum of Cambridge to emphasize mathematics and Newtonian natural philosophy, defending it from opponents. He provided the first systematic introduction to Differential calculus, detailed in his posthumous work The Method of Fluxions Applied to a Select Number of Useful Problems.

Saunderson did not follow the common practice of publishing his work; however, manuscripts of his lectures and treatises were in circulation and were used by a number of notable individuals including the astronomers James Bradley at Oxford University, Samuel Vince at Cambridge University and John Harrison for self-education prior to designing the marine chronometer. After he died, his work The Elements of Algebra in Ten Books was published in his name.

The discovery of Bayes' theorem remains a controversial topic in the history of mathematics. While it is certain to have been discovered before Thomas Bayes' time, there are several contenders for priority including Saunderson. At the time, much of mathematics research was performed through the exchange of private letters, and through verbal discussions, rather than publications. Historian of statistics Stephen Stigler concluded that Saunderson was the most probable discoverer after attempting to trace some of these letters and discussions, but has been challenged by other statisticians. Somewhat fittingly for a question about probability, it seems likely that the question will never be resolved completely but will remain as a probabilistic belief about Saunderson and others.

== Legacy ==
He appears as a fictional character on his deathbed in eighteenth-century novelist Denis Diderot's Letter on the Blind for the Use of those who can see, which discusses how man can acquire knowledge not only through perception, but also through reason. His character represents a person with no perception but endowed with logical genius, trying to comprehend God. This gives some indication of his celebrity status during his life, being used as an icon similarly to his chair's later occupant, Stephen Hawking, who also appears in debates about disability and genius.

In Penistone, St John's Gardens at St John's Church features a memorial to Saunderson. His birthplace in a nearby house on Towngate, Thurlstone, bore a "Hic Natus Est" inscribed stone; the house is long gone (1950s) but the stone is built into a wall in a small garden at nearby Townend. One of the old school buildings and a house of Penistone Grammar School, and a local residential street, Saunderson Gardens, are named after him.

In 2006, Saunderson's life was turned into a musical, No Horizon, written by Andy Platt, headmaster of Springvale Primary School in Penistone. The musical was performed at the Edinburgh Festival Fringe from 3–27 August 2016.

== See also ==
- Euclidean algorithm
- History of group theory
