= Penistone =

Town and civil parish in South Yorkshire, England

Coordinates: 53°31′30″N 1°37′45″W

- Town
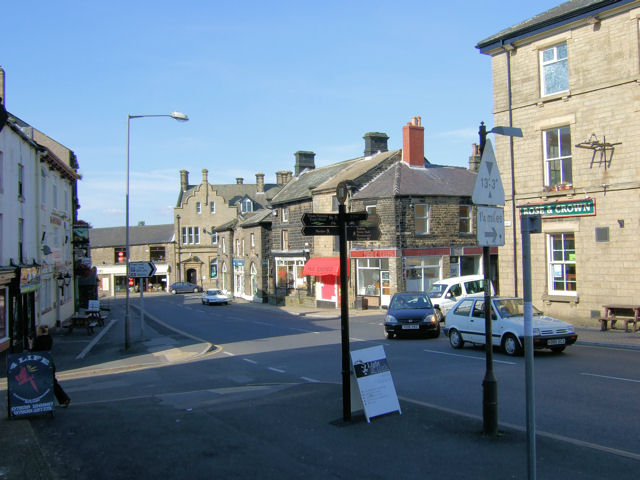
- Market Street, Penistone

- Location within South Yorkshire
- Population: 24,760 Wards (East and West) 2021
- OS grid reference: SE 245 033
  - London: 155 mi (249 km) SSE
- Civil parish: Penistone
- Metropolitan borough: Metropolitan Borough of Barnsley
- Metropolitan county: South Yorkshire
- Region: Yorkshire and the Humber
- Country: England
- Sovereign state: United Kingdom
- Post town: SHEFFIELD
- Postcode district: S36
- Dialling code: 01226
- Police: South Yorkshire
- Fire: South Yorkshire
- Ambulance: Yorkshire
- UK Parliament: Penistone and Stocksbridge

Penistone (/ˈpɛnɪstən/ PEN-iss-tən) is a market town and civil parish in the Metropolitan Borough of Barnsley, South Yorkshire, England. Historically in the ancient Wapentake of Staincross and the West Riding of Yorkshire, it lies 7 miles (11 km) west of central Barnsley, 17 miles (27 km) north-east of Glossop, 15 miles (24 km) north-west of Sheffield, 27 miles (43 km) south-west of Leeds and 29 miles (47 km) east of Manchester. Sited in the foothills of the Pennines, it had a population of 13,270 at the 2021 census. (Note: This figure includes the outlying settlements of Thurlstone and Millhouse Green, both within Penistone parish.) The town is frequently noted on lists of unusual place names.

The highest point, Hartcliffe Tower, lies 1,194 ft (364 m) above sea level, with views over the Woodhead bypass and the Dark Peak. The surrounding countryside is predominantly rural, with farming on rich well-watered soil on mainly gentle slopes rising to the bleak moorland to the west of the town. Dry stone walls, small hamlets and farms surrounded by fields and livestock are synonymous with the area. It is known for its rugged breed of sheep, the Whitefaced Woodland.

The market town itself stands at its highest point around St John's Church, at around 820 ft (250 m) above sea level. However, the surrounding land rises well over 1,000 ft (300 m) towards Cubley and Thurlstone Moors; it continues out towards smaller hamlets at Carlecotes, Victoria, Dunford and Crow Edge, elevated at points above 1,200 ft (370 m). There are several vantage points around Penistone that afford panoramic views of the surrounding areas of West Yorkshire and North Derbyshire.

== History ==
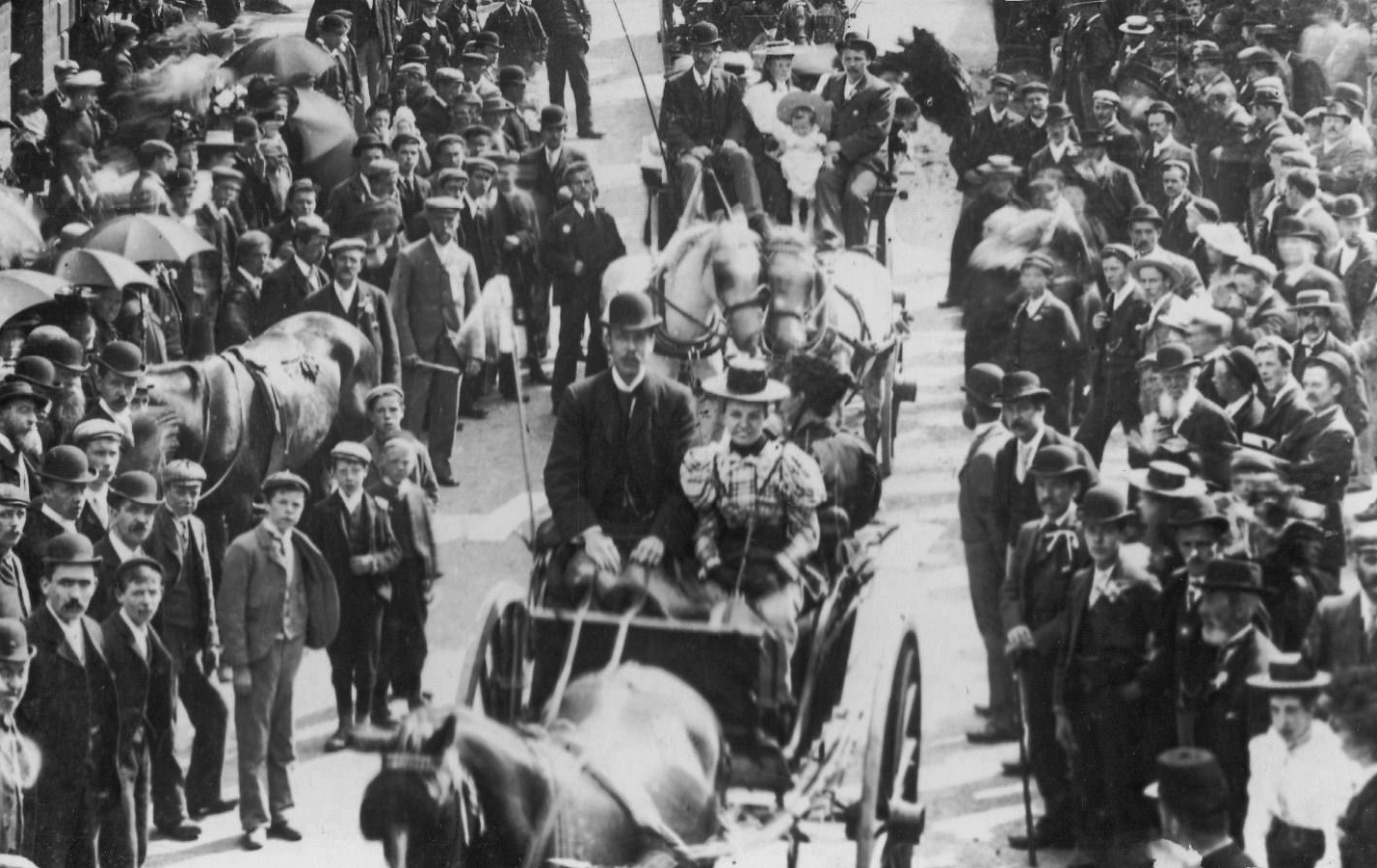
Peace Day in 1919

=== Toponymy ===
The place-name Penistone is first attested in the Domesday Book of 1086, where it appears as Pengeston(e) and Pangeston; later sources record it as Peningston. It may mean "the farmstead at the hill called Penning", in reference to the high ridge immediately south of the town. This combines the Brittonic word penn (meaning a head, end, or height) with the Old English suffix ing and the word tun (meaning a farmstead or village).

Penistone has frequently been noted on lists of unusual place-names, although the initial five letters are pronounced differently to what might otherwise be expected.

=== Medieval history ===
Since the times of the Anglian kingdom of Northumbria and at least Viking times Penistone was historically within the Wapentake of Staincross, an area that almost corresponds with the present day Barnsley Metropolitan Borough.

In 1066, the township was owned by Ailric. It was razed in 1069 in the Harrying of the North following the Norman Conquest; the Domesday Book described the settlement in 1086 as "waste".

Sir Gyles Penyston (fl. 13th century), whose family seat was in Cornwall (perhaps at Truro) before his time, and who is an ancestor of the Penyston Baronets, was styled of Penyston, denoting that he resided in Penistone.

=== Wool ===
The town was renowned for its Penistone cloth (or "forest white"), a rough, home-spun cloth. In a law passed in 1601 (43 Eliz. 1 cap. 10) regulating the working of cloth, penalties were set out for weavers found to be making Penistone cloth of inferior quality. Until the 18th century, home weavers in the area brought their products to town for sale in an annual cloth fair, but a Cloth Hall (or "piece hall") was built by subscription to facilitate regular sales to wool merchants in 1768.

Sheep sales have been held in the town since before 1699, when the market received a royal charter and the area produced the now rare Penistone sheep.

=== Buildings ===
The town remained small until the coming of the railway in 1845, although several pre-19th century buildings survive. The oldest still standing is Penistone Church. This is the Grade I listed medieval parish church, St John the Baptist Church. The White Hart pub in the town dates from 1377. Penistone had a market for a long time before its royal charter was granted in 1699, although its historic livestock market was closed recently to make way for town centre re-development. A new landmark building has been built in Penistone for the Market Place. This is an oaken Cruck Barn and was built by Carpenter Oak of Totnes, Devon.

=== Railway ===
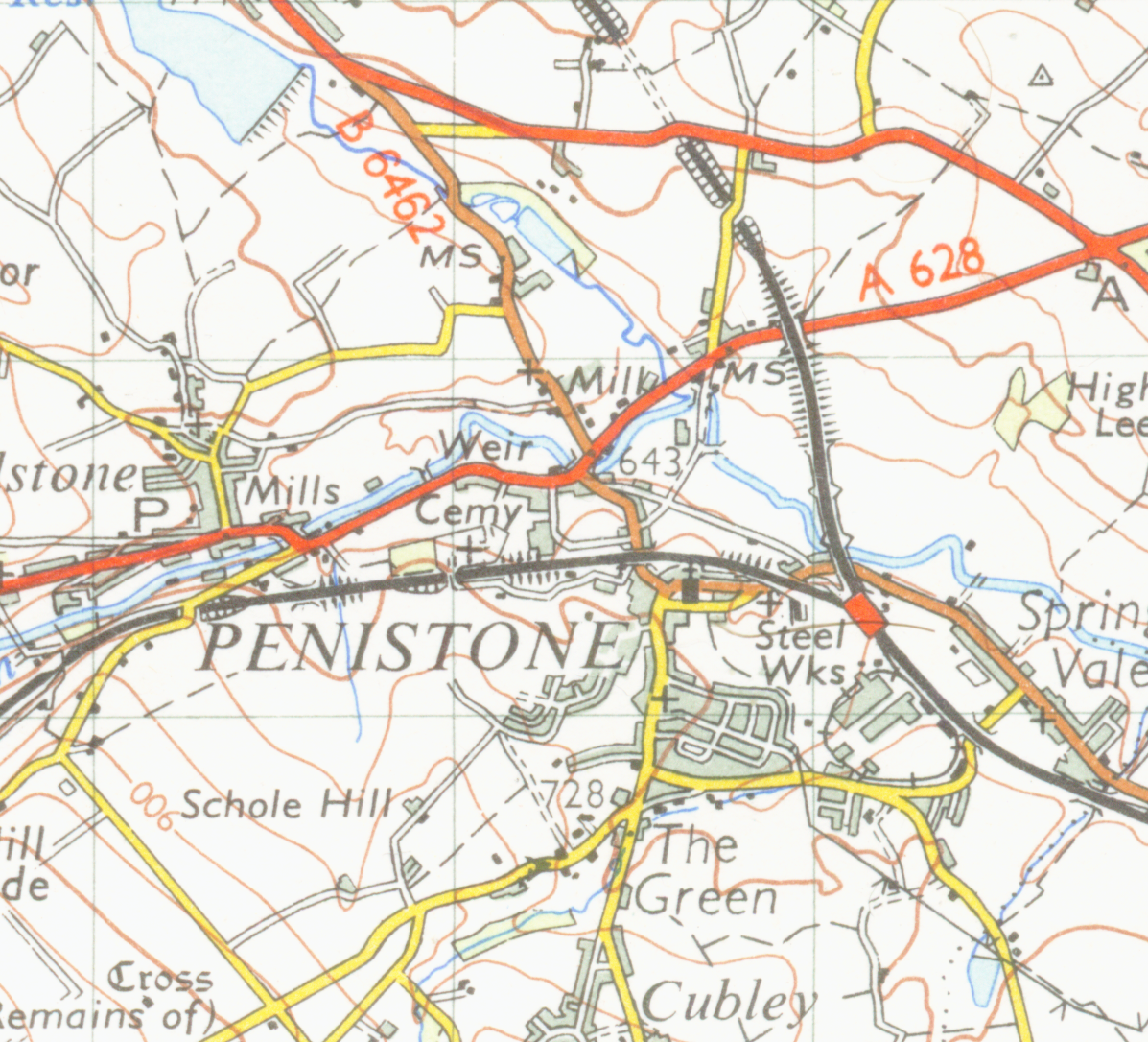
A map of Penistone from 1954 that shows the railway

The Manchester, Sheffield and Lincolnshire Railway opened on 15 July 1845, on a route via Penistone, Dunford Bridge and the three-mile long Woodhead Tunnel.

The line to Huddersfield was opened on 1 July 1850; Penistone became a railway junction, with a depot for engineering trains. There were frequent railway services to Barnsley, Manchester London Road, Sheffield Victoria and Huddersfield.

The 29-arch Penistone Viaduct was built in 1849 by Messrs. Ingham and Bower to a design by Sir John Hawkshaw. Stone was obtained from Walk Mill Bank, Oxspring and was conveyed by a tramway on the side of the river Don. The second and third arches of Penistone Viaduct collapsed on 2 February 1916, when heavy rain weakened the foundations; the driver and fireman of a stationary goods locomotive were able to jump clear and survive the collapse. Cracks in the parapet had been observed some days earlier. The viaduct was repaired and was back in service in August of the same year.

The town was served by the Woodhead line between Manchester London Road and Sheffield Victoria. Following major investment, which started in 1935 but was delayed by the Second World War, electrification of the railway was completed in 1954 and the line's power control centre was built adjacent to Penistone station. The building still stands and has been converted for commercial use. The Woodhead line was the first main line railway in the country to be electrified, but its once-pioneering 1500V DC system soon became non-standard.

Although the Beeching Report recommended the closure of the Hope Valley Line and the retention of Woodhead services, the government chose to implement the opposite; Woodhead line passenger services beyond Hadfield ended on 5 January 1970. Goods trains (mainly coal) continued to travel through the station for a further 1 years until the line was closed controversially between Penistone and Hadfield in July 1981; the track was lifted several years later. The route of the track is now used as part of the Trans-Pennine Trail.

== Geography ==
Penistone is situated on the south bank of the river Don. The parish, which included Gunthwaite, Hunshelf, Ingbirchworth, Langsett, Oxspring and Thurlstone, covered 21,338 acres (8,635 ha), mostly arable land and pasture and 2,000 acres (809 ha) of moorland. The underlying geology is the coal measures of the South Yorkshire Coalfield, from which some coal was mined in the 19th century, and sandstone flags were quarried.

== Governance ==
Penistone was a parish in the wapentake of Staincross in the West Riding of Yorkshire and became a member of the Wortley Poor law union in 1837.

Penistone formed part of the Barnsley West and Penistone constituency until the 2010 general election when it became part of the newly created Penistone and Stocksbridge parliamentary constituency.

Barnsley Metropolitan Borough Council is responsible for local government issues and Penistone Town Council, based at the town hall, is responsible for local issues.

== Economy ==
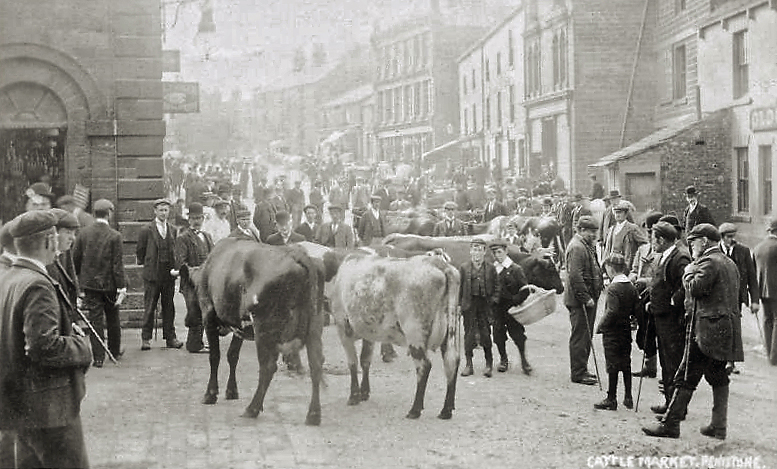
The cattle market pre-1914

Penistone still has a market, although smaller since the building of a Tesco supermarket in 2011, which reduced the market footprint. The cattle market, which opened in 1910, replaced the sale of livestock in the streets of Penistone. It was extended in 1933 again in 1951, but it closed after the 2003 foot and mouth disease outbreak of 2001. The Fur n Feathers market is also long since gone. At 747 feet (228 metres) elevation, Penistone is among the highest market towns in Yorkshire.

On 26 February 2007, the town was officially declared a Fairtrade Town.

The Market Cruck Barn was officially opened on 21 July 2011. Penistone Farmers' Market is a monthly farmers' market on the second Saturday of every month held in the market place.

== Education ==
Penistone Grammar School was founded in 1392. Notable former pupils include the blind mathematician Nicholas Saunderson, and Anne Campbell, who served as MP for Cambridge until May 2005. Most of the old school was demolished in 2011 and a new school was built.

Local primary schools include St John's, Spring Vale and Thurlstone.

== Events ==
On Shrove Tuesday in the early 20th century, it was the custom in the town for the church to ring a pancake bell.

Penistone Arts Week is held annually in March.

The annual Penistone Mayor's Parade Weekend is in June. It consists of two concerts, a parade and a gala.

The first Penistone Folk Festival took place in June 2011, in the Market Barn. This is now an annual charity event and occurs at around the same date as the earlier "Penistone Sing", on the festival of St John, to whom the parish church is dedicated.

Penistone Literary Festival ("Pen-Lit") was started in 2014.

On Yorkshire Day, 1 August 2006, the subsequently annual gathering of lord mayors, mayors and other civic heads from Yorkshire was held at Penistone. The day included a service at the parish church, a parade around the town, films and an evening of music at the Paramount Cinema and an exhibition at St John's Community Centre, and Hartcliff Tower was opened to the public. There were Morris dancers, a farmers' market, a shop-window competition and a historic organ concert at St Andrews Church.

The Penistone Show is an annual agricultural show, held on the second Saturday in September. As well as ordinary agricultural categories for sheep, cows, goats and poultry, entries are received in horticulture, handicraft, show jumping, pigeons, dogs and photography.

The town's Annual Competitive Music Festival is held at the grammar school on the last Saturday of September. The event was founded by Millhouse Green Male Voice Choir and was in its 48th year in 2016.

== Transport ==
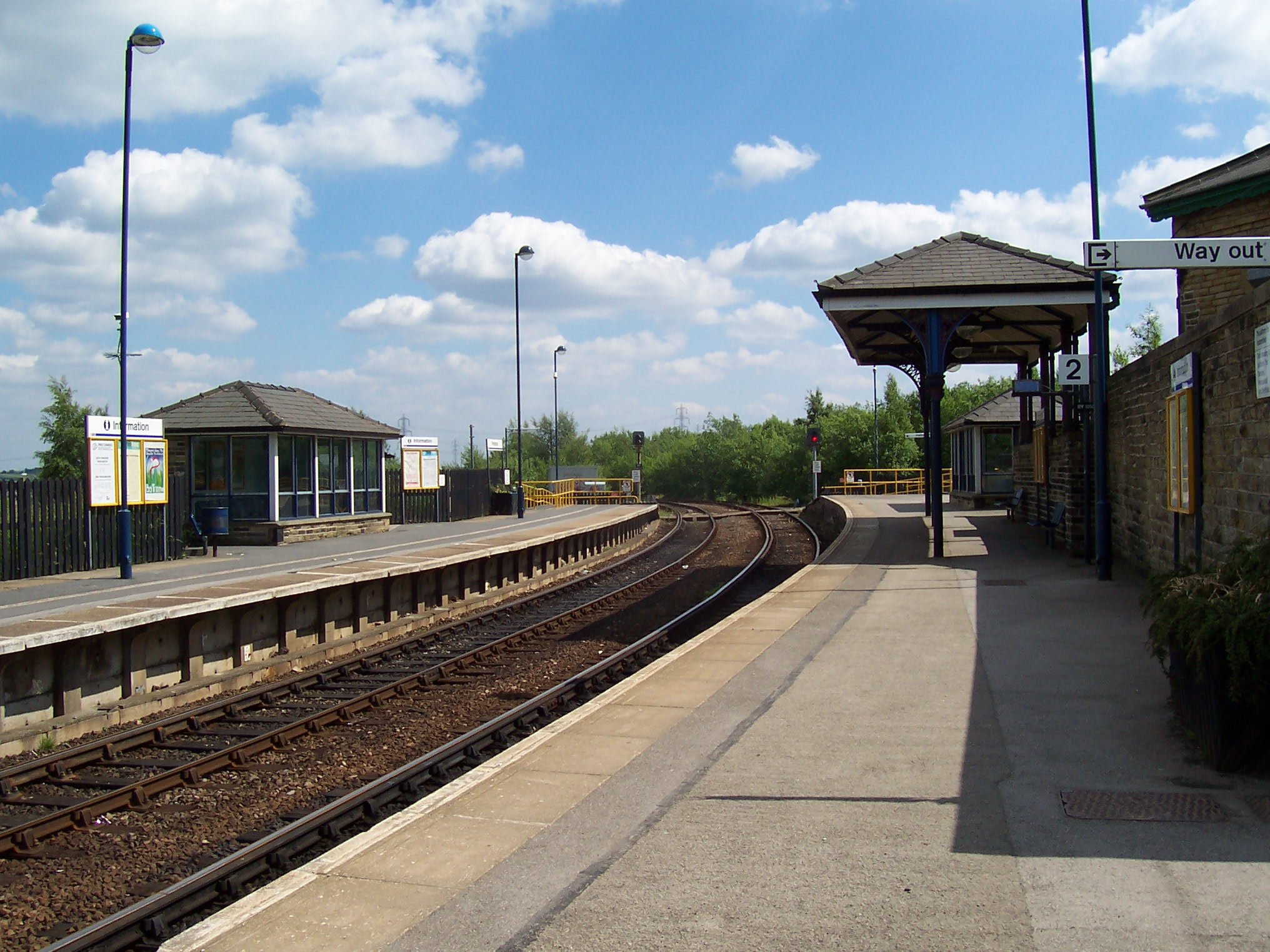
Penistone station; the former Woodhead line platforms still lie beyond the right extremity of the photograph

Penistone railway station lies on the Penistone Line; Northern Trains operates generally hourly services to Huddersfield, Barnsley Interchange, Meadowhall Interchange and Sheffield.

Bus services in the area are operated by Stagecoach Yorkshire and South Pennine Community Transport; routes connect Penistone with Barnsley, Holmfirth, Sheffield, Stocksbridge and Thurgoland.

== Religion ==
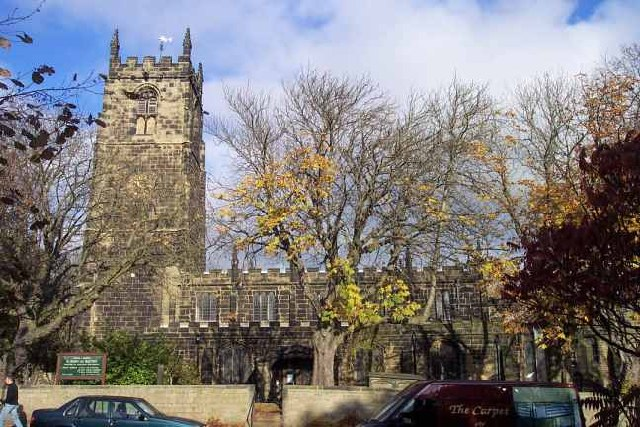
St John the Baptist Church

- St John the Baptist Church – Church of England
- St Andrews Church – United Reformed Church
- Penistone Community Church.

== Media ==
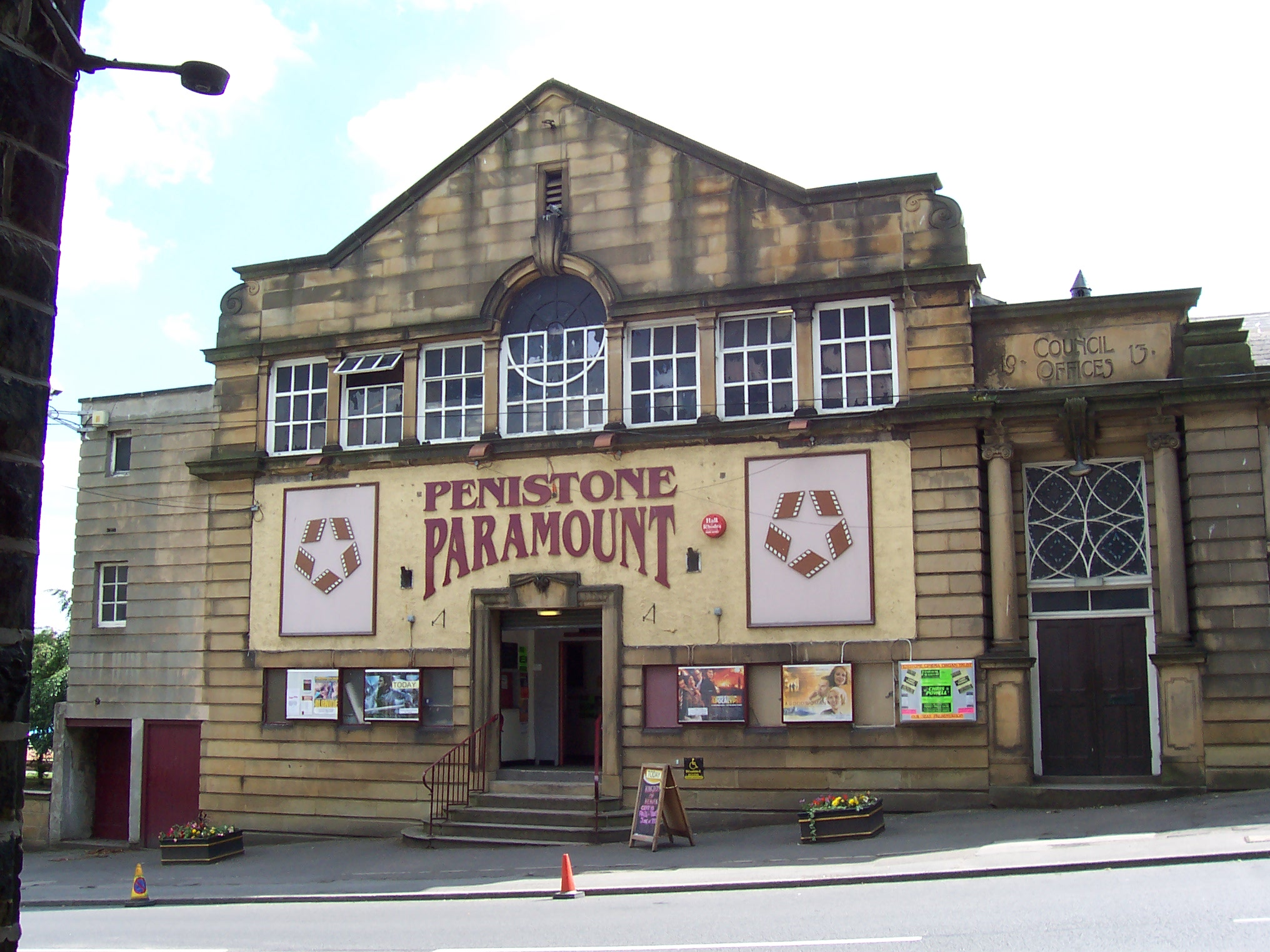
Penistone Paramount Cinema

Local news and television programmes are provided by BBC Yorkshire and ITV Yorkshire; television signals are received from the Emley Moor TV transmitter.

Local radio stations are BBC Radio Sheffield, Capital Yorkshire, Heart Yorkshire and Hits Radio South Yorkshire. Penistone FM, a not-for-profit community radio station, and Dearne FM which broadcasts to Barnsley, Penistone and the Dearne Valley areas of South Yorkshire.

The town is served by the local newspaper, Barnsley Chronicle.

== Sport and recreation ==
The local football team is Penistone Church F.C., which plays home matches at the Memorial Ground in Church View Road.

Penistone Cricket and Sports Club has a ground in Sheffield Road. Other clubs include:

- Penistone Gymnastics Club
- Penistone Chess Club
- Penistone Footpath Runners and Athletics Club
- Penistone Bowling Club, Back Lane.
- Quest Taekwondo Penistone.

== Notable people ==
- Scott High, footballer, midfielder. Current Huddersfield Town player
- Rachael McShane, cellist from Bellowhead, folk band
- Chris Morgan, footballer with Barnsley and Sheffield United
- Marc Roberts, footballer with|Barnsley
- Kate Rusby, folk singer from the nearby village of Cawthorne
- John Stones, international footballer for Barnsley, Manchester City and now Inter Milan
- Rolo Tomassi, an experimental rock band.

== Twin towns ==
Penistone is twinned with Grindavík, Iceland.

== See also ==
- Listed buildings in Penistone
