= Stocksbridge Railway =

British freight-only railway line in Sheffield

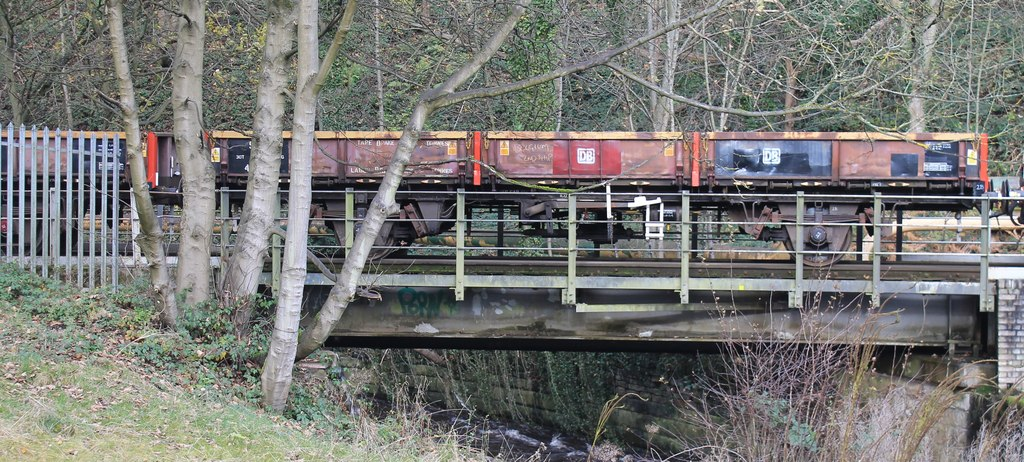
- A freight train crossing the River Don bridge on the Stocksbridge Railway

Overview
- Status: Operational
- Locale: South Yorkshire
- Termini: Deepcar station; Stocksbridge works

Service
- Type: Heavy rail
- Operator: Stocksbridge Steelworks

History
- Opened: 1877
- Closed: 2024

Technical
- Line length: 1.88 miles (3.03 km) (main line)
- Number of tracks: One plus multiple sidings
- Track gauge: 1,435 mm (4 ft 8 1/2 in) standard gauge

The Stocksbridge Railway was a subsidiary of Samuel Fox and Company and linked the company's works at Stocksbridge, near Sheffield, South Yorkshire, England, with the main line of the Manchester, Sheffield and Lincolnshire Railway at Deepcar. As the size of Fox's steelworks expanded, better transport links were needed, and the railway was authorised by an act of Parliament in 1874. It was completed in 1877, and remained an independent subsidiary until 1992, when it became part of the steelworks operation. When the Woodhead line was closed to the north of Deepcar, the line south to Sheffield was singled, and operates as a long siding.

A 3 1/2-mile (5.6 km) extension was constructed between 1897 and 1898 by Sheffield Corporation, to service the construction of reservoirs at Langsett and Underbank. It was unusual in that it used dual gauge track to allow both standard gauge and 3 ft (914 mm)-gauge stock to work on it. Reservoir building was completed in 1904, but the locomotive was retained until 1907 when Underbank Reservoir was finally full. Subsequently, the line was used occasionally until 1912 for deliveries of chalk, using locomotives from the steelworks.

== History ==
Samuel Fox arrived in Stocksbridge in 1842, and rented a cotton mill, which he subsequently bought in 1851. He adapted it to produce wire for textile pins, and in 1848 started to produce wire for umbrella frames. Realising that it would be cheaper to produce steel than to buy it in, he then invested in furnaces and a rolling mill. Soon he was producing rails for the railway industry and springs, but transporting his products to the nearest rail head at Deepcar was difficult, and so he solved the problem by building a railway link.

Stocksbridge Railway Act 1874
- Act of Parliament
- Parliament of the United Kingdom
- Long title: An Act for making a railway from the Manchester, Sheffield, and Lincolnshire Railway at Deepcar to Stocksbridge; and for other purposes.
- Citation: 37 & 38 Vict. c. lv

Dates
- Royal assent: 30 June 1874

Text of statute as originally enacted

The line was authorised by the Stocksbridge Railway Act 1874 (37 & 38 Vict. c. lv). This act of Parliament created the Stocksbridge Railway Company, with powers to construct a railway which was 1 mile 71 chains (3.0 km) long. The railway was to be financed by the issuing of 3,300 shares, valued at £10 each, to give a working capital of £33,000. The act gave the Manchester, Sheffield and Lincolnshire Railway, to whose line the railway would connect at Deepcar station, rights to invest in the Stocksbridge Railway, although they were not permitted to sell any shares which they acquired. The company was to have three directors, and these were named as Samuel Fox, Henry Unwin, and James Halliday in the act, on the understanding that when the first ordinary meeting of shareholders was held, they could retain these men or elect others as they thought appropriate. Once the act became law, the directors had three years to complete construction of the railway.

The engineer for the project was Fred Fowler, the brother of Sir John Fowler, who designed the Forth Railway Bridge. The main contractor was a Mr Rigby, but there was also involvement by Fowler's nephew, who was part of Fowler and Marshall. When the work was nearing completion, a Board of Trade inspection took place, but opening was delayed by the requirement for additional work at the Deepcar end of the line. The line finally opened on 14 April 1877.

When the line was built, it was equipped with one steam locomotive, 76 wagons and a brake van. Initially this was a Manning Wardle 0-4-0 locomotive called Fox, built in 1876, but this was soon assisted by Wharncliffe, an 0-6-0 locomotive built by the same manufacturer in 1867. By 1941, the railway was using an 0-6-0 side tank, built by Hudswell Clarke in 1923. At that time, the steelworks also owned 11 steam locomotives for use internally, all but one with the 0-6-0 wheel formation, and with a mixture of side and saddle tanks. Passenger services on the line commenced on 14 April 1877, making use of the bay platform at Deepcar station, to a platform in Stocksbridge, on the edge of the works complex. The passenger service ceased in 1931.

The line later became a subsidiary of the steel company, under various ownerships, until 1992, when it ended its separate existence. Some idea of the size of the undertaking can be gained from the fact that in 1954 it carried 490,912 tons of traffic, and 22 staff were employed to operate the railway. The line was confirmed to be mothballed in 2024.

In May 2020, three groups worked together in an attempt to secure funding from the government's Restoring Your Railway Fund for a feasibility study aimed at reinstating passenger services between Sheffield and Stocksbridge. The plans envisaged running trains over the Don Valley line, calling at re-opened stations at Neepsend, Wadsley Bridge, Oughtibridge, and Deepcar, with the trains continuing over the Stocksbridge Railway to a new station at Stocksbridge. The pitch was made by Miriam Cates, the MP for Penistone and Stocksbridge, the Sheffield City Region Mayoral Combined Authority, and the Don Valley Railway group. The bid was one of 60 made to secure funds in the first round of applications, and although the first bid was unsuccessful, Cates and the Sheffield Authority were invited to further talks with the Department for Transport in June 2020 and it succeeded via a subsequent round of bids in 2021. On the 4th of October 2023 Prime Minister Rishi Sunak confirmed that the Don Valley Railway between Stocksbridge and Sheffield would be on the list of lines to be reopened as part of the government's "Network North" Scheme which was launched to replace HS2.

=== The Langsett Railway ===
In 1896, Sheffield Corporation negotiated with Fox's Steelworks to allow them to build an extension to the railway, from the steelworks up to the site of the dam for Langsett Reservoir. This would enable them to carry materials for the construction of both Langsett and Underbank reservoirs. The preferred route ran along the southern edge of Fox's site, close to the road, but in order to fit it in, the Little Don River needed to be diverted to the south, and a bridge constructed to carry the railway over the revised course. Until this work was completed, the corporation negotiated the use of a more northerly route, which ran between the buildings in the works. From the western end of the site, the new line continued under Underbank Lane, and ran on the north side of the road from Stocksbridge to Flounce. Two bridges were required to carry it over roads at Midhopestones, and then it passed under the Manchester Road to end at a quarry near to the foot of the Langsett dam. Within the steelworks, construction was carried out by Fowler and Marshall, a contract which included diverting the river and building the bridge. The rest of the line was built by direct labour, which the corporation employed, and the line was ready for use by 7 September 1898. Sheffield Corporation obtained an 0-6-0 saddle tank from Manning Wardle to work the line. The locomotive was named Langsett, and although construction of the reservoirs was completed in 1904, it was retained until late 1907, when filling of the Underbank Reservoir was completed. It was then sold to the steelworks, where it was used as a shunter. The railway was just over 3 1/2 miles (5.6 km) long, and was constructed with three rails, enabling it to be used by standard gauge and 3 ft (914 mm) gauge stock. After 1907, the tracks were retained for another five years or so, and occasional trains of chalk were worked up to Langsett Reservoir by locomotives from the steelworks. Most of the route still exists, and is now used as a bridleway.

=== Deepcar station ===
Deepcar station was on the Woodhead line between Sheffield and Manchester Central, which was electrified in the 1950s, with electric locomotives running right through from September 1954. However, the line was closed in 1981, only 27 years later, although trains from Sheffield to Huddersfield via Penistone continued to pass through Deepcar until 1983, when they were re-routed through Barnsley and West Silkstone. The station had closed to passengers in 1959 and for all traffic in 1968. In order to enable steel trains to continue reaching Stocksbridge, once the Woodhead line had closed, the track between Deepcar and Nunnery Junction in Sheffield was singled and retained as a long siding.

== Route ==
The line officially began at a rail joint which was 77 yards (70 m) to the north of Deepcar station. The line turned to the west, where there were a number of exchange sidings, after which it crossed a viaduct over the River Don, some 56 feet (17 m) below. The line is steeply graded, and descends at 1 in 27 to cross a bridge over the Wortley Road. Sidings to the north of the line formerly served Hen Holmes Brick and Tile Works, while to the south, trailing sidings served a brick yard, from which a tramway ran to a ganister and brick works at Carr Lane. The railway then crossed over the Little Don River on Hen Holmes bridge. By 1931, Hen Holme Works was disused, but a new set of sidings had been constructed to the north of the tracks, beyond the Little Don bridge. By 1959, the section before the Little Don bridge had been converted to double track, with the southern track containing a weigh bridge, with two more sidings to the south of that. The sidings to the brick yard were still there, but the tramway and gannister works were not.

After Henholmes level crossing, the line begins to rise and crosses the Little Don again. Soon, the river is culverted, and the railway crosses its subterranean course. The line enters the Low Yard, beyond which the wooden station stood close to the road until it was demolished in 1932. The only overbridge was known as Smithy Hill Tunnel, after which there was an engine shed and watering point. The line continued through the works to the Horner House sidings and engine shed. While the railway was just under 2 miles (3.2 km) long, there were many miles of sidings in addition to the main line.

== Bibliography ==
- Bowtell, Harold D (1979). In the Sheffield Hills. Stocksbridge and District History Society. Archived from the original on 3 August 2021. (This appears to be an excerpt from a larger book)
- Butt, R V J (1995). The Directory of Railway Stations. Yeovil: Patrick Stephens. ISBN 978-1-85260-508-7.
- Cumber, Robert (28 May 2020). "Fresh talks planned over campaign to reopen Sheffield railway line". The Star. Archived from the original on 13 July 2020.
- Johnson, E M (2001). Woodhead The Electric Railway. Foxline. ISBN 978-1-870119-81-8.
- Mallinson, C R (Winter 2006). "Rails in the Don Valley". The Paragon (issue 46). Stocksbridge and District History Society. Archived from the original on 3 August 2021.
