= Don Valley Railway =

Heritage rail project in Yorkshire, England

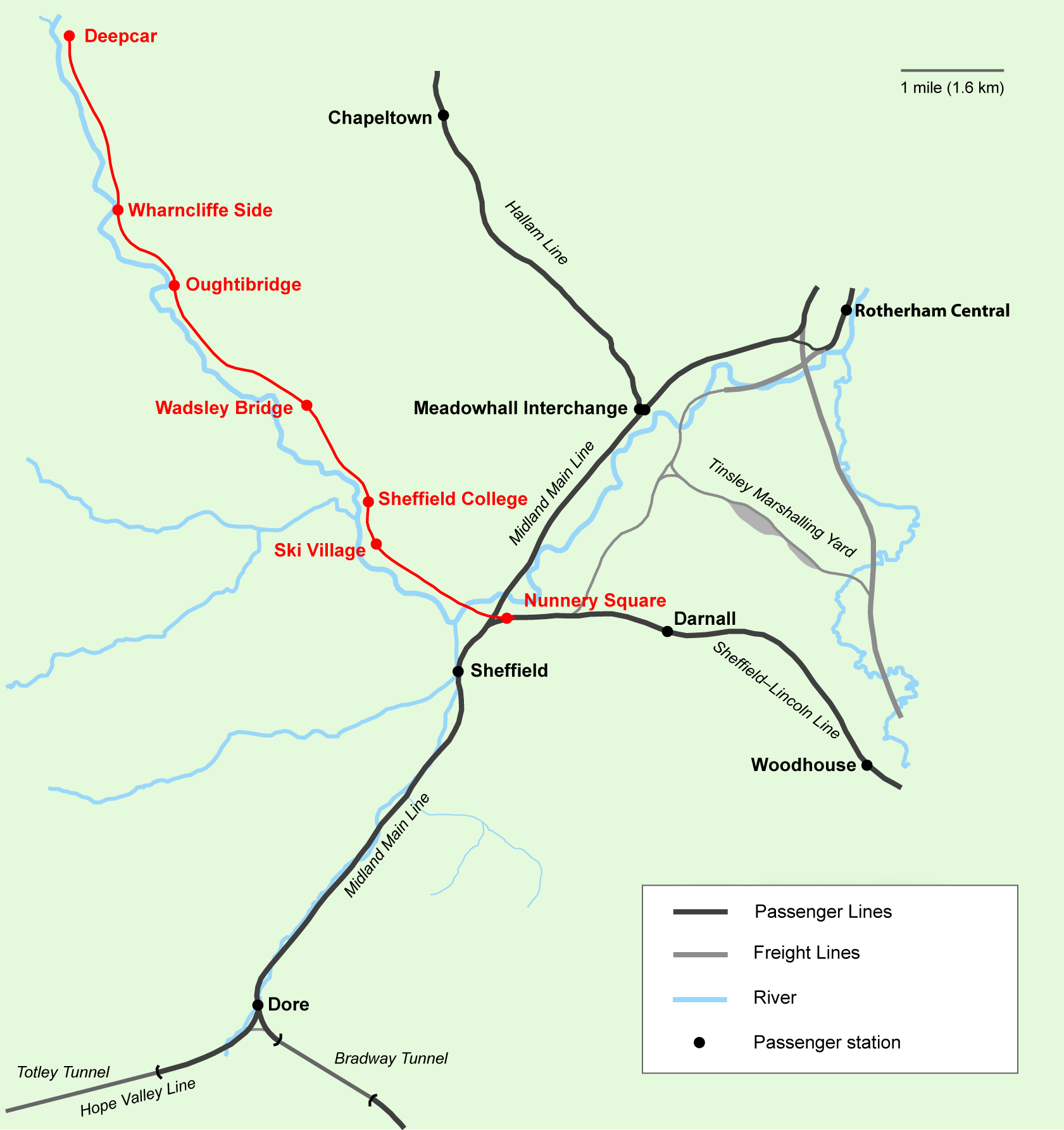
The railways of Sheffield with the proposed route of the Don Valley Railway highlighted in red.

Don Valley Railway first formed as a heritage rail project in September 2003 to operate on the freight rail line between Stocksbridge Steel Works and Sheffield following the route of the former Woodhead Line between Deepcar and Sheffield, The project is developed by Don Valley Railway Ltd., a not-for-profit company and registered charity based in Stocksbridge, South Yorkshire. Original plans to operate heritage rail services for the dual purpose of providing infrastructure for tourism over the weekends, alongside regular commuter services have now shifted towards concentrating on the development of a viable commuter service - though with help of outside assistance heritage plans could be revised. In 2023, the Department for Transport announced that the Don Valley Line will be restored for passenger use, plans which were subsequently re-affirmed by the launch of the South Yorkshire People's Network.

== Project ==
The proposed route runs along trackbed owned by Network Rail that was constructed in the 1840s by the Sheffield, Ashton-Under-Lyne and Manchester Railway (later the Great Central Railway) as part of their line between Manchester and Sheffield. This line, which became known as the Woodhead Line, closed to passengers in 1970. The portion of the Woodhead Line that the Don Valley Railway propose to use is currently used as a freight-only line linking the national rail network with tracks owned by the steelworks at Stocksbridge.

== History ==
Stocksbridge resident David Goodison first conceived the idea of rehabilitating the line in 2003, and local authorities, politicians, and community groups have since voiced their support. The South Yorkshire Passenger Transport Executive (SYPTE) included the proposal as a potential reopened route in its 2009 Rail Strategy & Delivery Plan, noting the ongoing investigation of the plan's feasibility, and that the executive had been lending support and advice for the project. In early 2010, SYPTE reaffirmed its support for the project, contributing funds toward professional assessment of the business plan to reopen the line and the feasibility of the line itself; additional funding for the assessment was to be provided by Sheffield City Council and private supporters.

The railway project received a boost in late June 2010 when a feasibility study draft indicated that the cost to develop a weekday commuter service along the route would be several times lower than initially estimated. A local government official supportive of the project cited reduced traffic as a primary benefit, leading to shorter commutes and a smaller regional carbon footprint. However, the same official admitted that raising capital for the project remained difficult in the economic environment of mid-2010.

== Feasibility study ==
The Feasibility Study, undertaken by specialist consultants Arup, looked at the engineering viability of a commuter service on the route and looked at the viability of the project from previous studies. This engineering feasibility study has shown that:

- Reopening the Stocksbridge to Sheffield route to passenger rail traffic is feasible in engineering terms.
- The Network Rail owned section from Deepcar to Victoria appears to be in good condition and suitable for the introduction of a DMU shuttle.
- The station sites at Deepcar and Victoria appear suitable for the modest station layouts described.
- The capital cost for infrastructure is estimated at £4.3m; the annual running costs are estimated at £1.8m.

Arup recommended that further study is conducted into the following areas in particular: operational arrangements; type and cost of rolling stock; station layout arrangements; track gauge and weight restrictions; sources of funding and patronage estimates.

The study can be found on the Don Valley Railway's website.

=== Business plan ===
Following the Feasibility Study Don Valley Railway are in the process of developing a business plan to operate passenger services on the route.

In order to reduce the infrastructure costs to a minimum, the most viable introductory service is a non-stop shuttle between a station at Stocksbridge or Deepcar and a station in Sheffield, at or close to the site of the old Sheffield Victoria Station. This would serve these two stations only with a half-hourly service. With the route being a single track with no places where it is possible for trains to pass, this service pattern allows a half-hourly service to operate on the route without the need to build extra track. This would also link a station in Deepcar or Stocksbridge with Sheffield in a service that takes only 11 minutes for the 9 mile trip.

=== Proposed stations ===
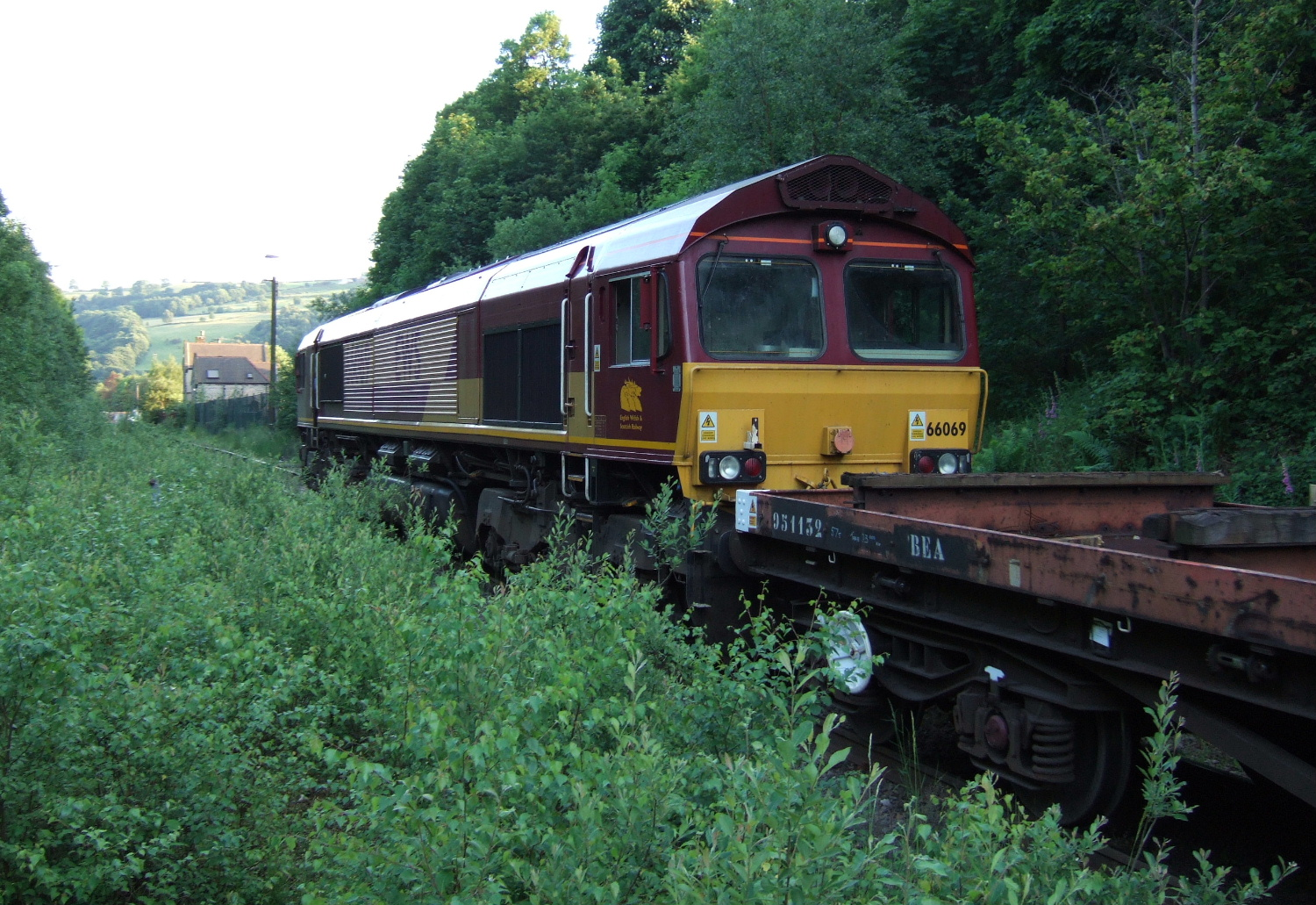
English Welsh & Scottish train approaching the former Deepcar station

At various times numerous station locations have been considered along the route:

- Manchester (new track)
- Penistone (new track)
- Oxspring (new track)
- Thurgoland (new track)
- Stocksbridge
- Deepcar (reopened old station)
- Wharncliffe Side
- Oughtibridge (reopened old station, formerly known as Oughty Bridge)
- Wadsley Bridge (reopened old station)
- Hillsborough and Owlerton (Proposed station to serve the Sheffield College Hillsborough Campus and the districts of Hillsborough and Owlerton)
- Sheffield (former) ski village
- Sheffield (former Victoria Station site)
- Sheffield (Nunnery Square)
- Meadowhall (Lower Don Valley - new station to serve part of the Lower Don Valley area of Sheffield and link into the Sheffield Supertram)
- Darnall (extended service - to interchange with train services on the Sheffield to Lincoln Line)
- Woodhouse (extended service)
- Orgreave (extended service)
- The Advanced Manufacturing Park (extended service)
- Retford (extended service)
- Chesterfield (extended service)

It is hoped that some of these can be incorporated into the planned services.

=== Parry People Movers ===
Extrapolated figures from work done in 2006 to evaluate the viability of the rail service on the Don Valley Line by Arup for South Yorkshire Passenger Transport Executive found that although the level of subsidy per passenger would be less than the average on current (2006) supported services, that the additional subsidy would not be available. Therefore, in order to introduce a viable service Don Valley Railway considered other methods for operating the service than via a standard National Rail franchised services model.

Don Valley Railway therefore considered utilising Ultra Light Rail Rapid Transit for the passenger service as operated by Parry People Movers. The West Midlands-based company has pioneered this technology on the UK rail network with the Stourbridge Town to Stourbridge Junction service. It is hoped that an adaption of this can be brought in on the Don Valley Railway.

=== Extending the service ===
The business plan sets out options for expanding beyond the basic service and looks at other options for utilisation of the line. Stations at Oughtibridge, Wadsley Bridge and Neepsend are considered in the business plan along with the link to Supertram at Nunnery. The business plan also considers operating to the east to bring in a cross-city service to serve Darnall, the Advanced Manufacturing Park, Orgreave and Woodhouse.

=== Leisure ===
Originally, at weekends and holidays Don Valley Railway ltd. planned to operate the Don Valley Railway line as a double tracked heritage railway, with Preserved Steam, Diesel and Electric trains running along the route between Sheffield City Centre and Deepcar. In addition they hope to establish a living museum in Stocksbridge, which will be centred on the history of steel making in the valley and provide a local visitor attraction.

However now the focus is on finding Heritage Rail partners to operate services up the line. As part of this it is proposed to rejuvenate old stations along the route to receive trains from mainline heritage operators.
