= Langsett Reservoir =

Reservoir in South Yorkshire, England

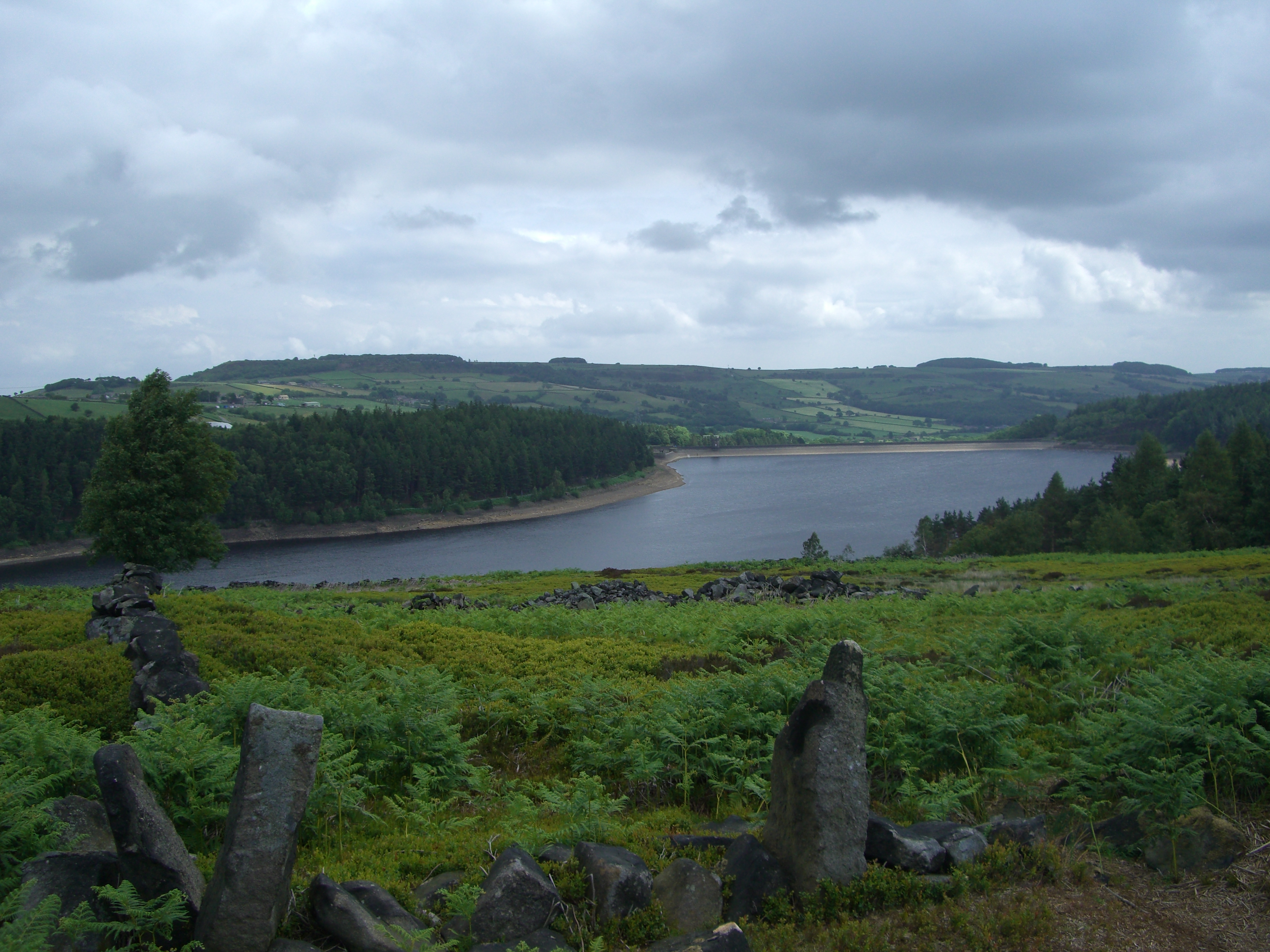
- Seen from Hingcliff Common to the west

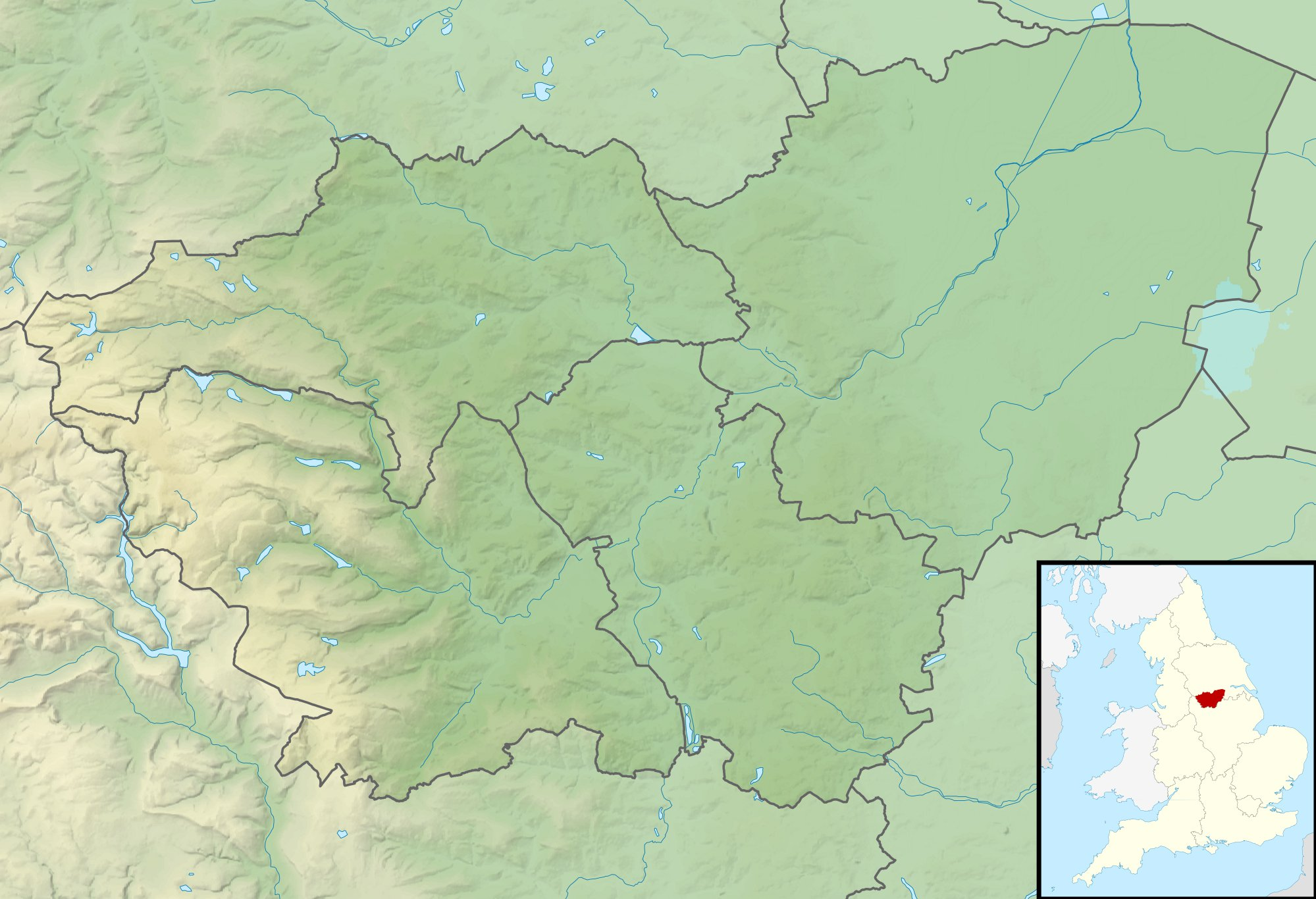
- Location within South Yorkshire
- Location: Langsett, Barnsley, South Yorkshire.
- Coordinates: 53°29′47″N 1°41′10″W
- Type: reservoir
- Primary inflows: Little Don River
- Catchment area: 5,203 acres (2,106 ha)
- Basin countries: England
- Surface area: 51 ha (130 acres)
- Max. depth: 97 ft (30 m)
- Water volume: 1,408,000,000 imp gal (6.40×10^{9} L; 1.691×10^{9} US gal)

Green shading shows conifer plantation; red star indicates North America Farm

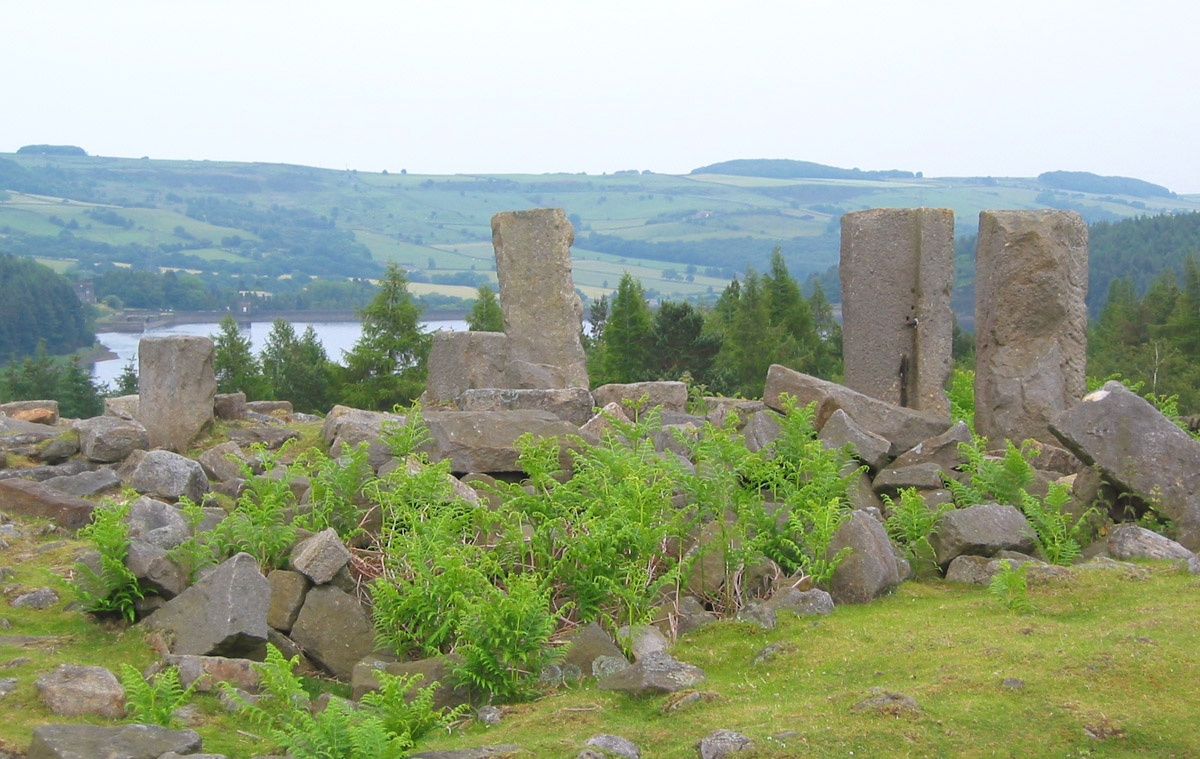
Ruins of North America Farm, with Langsett Reservoir behind

Langsett Reservoir is in the Metropolitan Borough of Barnsley, South Yorkshire, England, near the villages of Langsett and Upper Midhope, on the edge of the Peak District National Park. The reservoir was constructed between 1898 and 1904, and is now managed by Yorkshire Water. Fed by the Little Don or Porter River, it is around a mile long, and supplies water for Barnsley and Sheffield via the Langsett Treatment Works.

== Construction and statistics ==
Construction of the reservoir began in 1898, the logistics of getting the workforce and materials to Langsett caused great difficulty as most of them came up from Sheffield. This involved a journey over four different stretches of railway line, the first leg was from Sheffield Midland Station to Deepcar, this was followed by a journey to Stocksbridge on the Samuel Fox and Company private line. From the Samuel Fox steelworks a new one mile long line was built to reach the Underbank Reservoir to join up with the Water Authority track up to Langsett Reservoir.

The reservoir is 125 acres (51 ha) in area with a depth of 97 feet (30 m) and has a holding capacity of 1,408 million gallons, making it the largest of the water supply reservoirs in the City of Sheffield district. The catchment area is the Langsett Moors to the west and this covers an area of 5,203 acres (2,106 ha). The embankment is 1,156 feet (352 m) long with a height of 117 feet (36 m) from the bottom of the old river bed. The embankment is 720 feet (220 m) wide at the bottom tapering to 36 feet (11 m) at the top and contains 900,000 cubic yards of infill in the puddle wall and concrete trench, making it one of the largest earth embankments in Great Britain. The minor road (Midhope Cliff Lane) which runs across the embankment is thought to be the longest single carriageway of any reservoir in Great Britain. The embankment road has a sharp bend in it as it joins the A616 main road, this was a last minute change in construction plans, as keeping it straight would have meant the demolition of the Waggon and Horses public house. The reservoir was completed in 1904 when Alderman T.R. Gainsford closed the valve in the Langsett tower and the reservoir started to fill up, he was then presented with a golden key by the engineer William Watts.

Local depopulation was used in the early part of the twentieth century to improve the water purity. Six farms were abandoned; these included Brookhouse farm and North America farm, and the last farmer left around 1907. The ruins of North America remain to the south-west of the reservoir even though it was used for target practice during the Second World War. In 1962 conifers were planted around the reservoir as shown on the map, with the aim of providing a habitat for many species of indigenous wildlife. This plantation is called Langsett Woods. In recent years the woods have been restructured with most of the coniferous trees being felled and being replaced by oak and birch trees in an effort to create a new upland oak woodland. In 2007 a pond was created near Brookhouse Bridge at the western end of the reservoir to help dragonflies, frogs, newts and toads establish new colonies. The Pennine peaks of Pike Lowe (478 m) and Hingcliff Common (358 m) lie to the south and south-west of the reservoir, respectively. The area is used for sheep farming and grouse shooting, and it is popular with walkers, mountain bikers and birdwatchers with treecreepers, great spotted woodpeckers and red grouse to be seen in the vicinity.

=== Langsett water treatment works ===
The present-day Langsett water treatment works were built to replace the older works at Midhope and Langsett reservoirs. The older works used sand filter beds to treat the water, although the water was safe to drink, the sand filters had never been able to remove the brown discolouration caused by rainwater falling on the surrounding peat moorland. After much complaining from consumers, it was decided in 1980 to build a completely new treatment works. South Yorkshire Water Authority gave permission in December 1981 to build the works in an old quarry adjacent to the reservoir wall. Worked started in 1983 with water from the new works going into the supply system in July 1986. The works clarify the water by the addition of chemicals before the filtration stage to bring it up to the latest EU standards. The works can produce 60,000 cubic metres (60 million litres) of treated water per day.

In 2017 a £20 million scheme was announced by Yorkshire Water to upgrade the treatment works to further improve the discolouration and remove deposits from the raw water collected from the moors around the reservoir. The work began in September 2017 and will take three years to complete.

== Recreation ==
The Peak District Boundary Walk runs along the north side of the reservoir and across the dam.
