= North Cliffe =

Hamlet in the East Riding of Yorkshire, England

Coordinates: 53.822384°N 0.673713°W

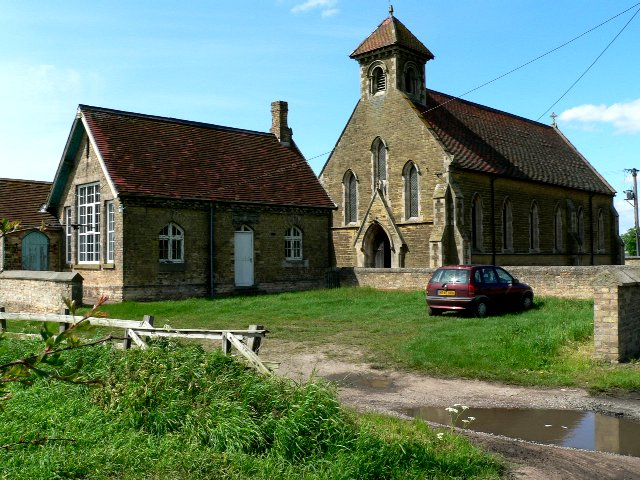
- Parish Church of St John, serving North Cliffe and South Cliffe

- Location within the East Riding of Yorkshire
- OS grid reference: SE874370
  - London: 160 mi (260 km) S
- Civil parish: South Cliffe
- Unitary authority: East Riding of Yorkshire
- Ceremonial county: East Riding of Yorkshire
- Region: Yorkshire and the Humber
- Country: England
- Sovereign state: United Kingdom
- Post town: YORK
- Postcode district: YO43
- Dialling code: 01430
- Police: Humberside
- Fire: Humberside
- Ambulance: Yorkshire
- UK Parliament: Goole and Pocklington

North Cliffe is a hamlet and former civil parish, now in the parish of South Cliffe, in the East Riding of Yorkshire, England. It is situated about 3 miles (5 km) north of North Cave, 2 miles (3.2 km) west of Newbald and 3 miles south of Market Weighton. The hamlet bestrides Cliffe Road. On the eastern side lies the houses, and to the west is a small church/chapel. In 1931 the parish had a population of 71.

North Cliffe is the home of The White Rose Polo Club which is a member of the Hurlingham Polo Association.

The parish church, dedicated to St John, is located in North Cliff and was designated a Grade II listed building in 1996 and is now recorded in the National Heritage List for England, maintained by Historic England.

== History ==
South Cliffe was formerly a township in the parish of Sancton, from 1866 North Cliffe was a civil parish in its own right, on 1 April 1935 the parish was abolished and merged with South Cliffe.

== Notable residents ==
- Samuel Fox, industrialist and businessman, founder of Samuel Fox and Company and Fox Umbrella Frames Ltd at Stocksbridge. Samuel financed St John's church, and was the first to be buried in the churchyard in 1887.

== See also ==
- Listed buildings in South Cliffe
