= Stocksbridge railway station =

Disused railway station in South Yorkshire, England

Stocksbridge

General information
- Location: Stocksbridge, City of Sheffield; England
- Coordinates: 53.48256°N 1.59058°W
- Grid reference: SK272985
- Platforms: 1

Other information
- Status: Disused

Key dates
- 1877: opened
- 1931: closed
Location

Stocksbridge was a railway station serving the town of Stocksbridge, the terminus of, and only railway station on the Stocksbridge Railway. The platform was a simple wooden affair, nothing more was needed to cater for the service provided.

The passenger service, which ran from a west facing bay platform at Deepcar, on the Manchester, Sheffield and Lincolnshire Railways Woodhead Line, commenced operation on 14 April 1877 and ceased in 1931. Operation was undertaken by the Stocksbridge Railway Company who bought two small coaches for the trains, utilising their own locomotive.

In the main, passengers consisted of workers going to Samuel Fox and Company's works and school children.
