= Little Don River =

River in South Yorkshire, England

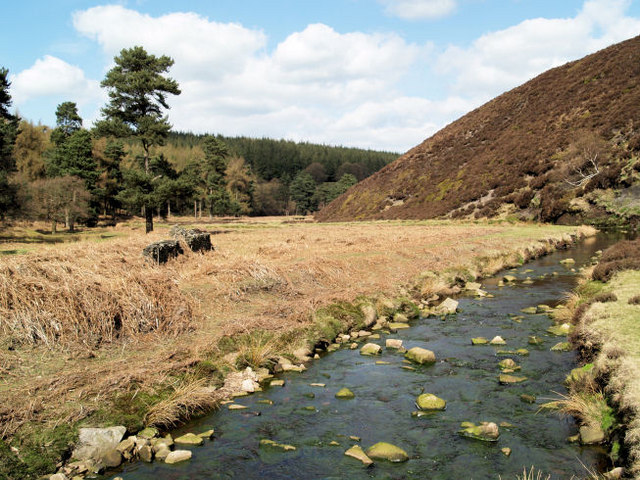
- Little Don River near Langsett

Location
- Country: England

Physical characteristics
- Source
  - location: Rushbed Moor
  - coordinates: 53°28′N 1°46′W
  - elevation: 1,670 feet (510 m)
- Mouth
  - location: River Don, Deepcar
  - coordinates: 53°28′38″N 1°33′34″W
  - elevation: 430 feet (130 m)

The Little Don River also known as the Porter, is a tributary of the River Don in South Yorkshire, England. Arising on the Langsett Moors in the northern Peak District, the Little Don River feeds the Langsett and Underbank Reservoirs. It runs through the town of Stocksbridge before joining the River Don.

A 2.7-acre (1.1-hectare) section of the river has been designated as a site of special scientific interest since 1977. The site is of considerable importance as it is a proposed reference example for various subdivisions of the Carboniferous. It is one of 35 sites of special scientific interest in South Yorkshire.

== Course ==
The Little Don rises as a large number of streams flowing northwards from Howden Edge, close to the 1,640-foot (500 m) contour, on Rushbed Moor and Harden Moor, which unite and then flow eastwards. It is soon joined by Loftwshaw Brook, which similarly starts as a number of streams on Rushbed Moor, but slightly further to the west, and follows a more northerly route before joining the Little Don. It is joined by Mickleden Beck and Haslingshaw, both of which flow northwards and join the right bank. Long Moor Beck flows eastwards and joins as the Little Don enters Swinden Plantation, and the moorland scenery gives way to woodland. The river loops to the north, where it is joined by Great Grain, and passes over a weir to enter Langsett Reservoir.

The reservoir was built as a joint venture by the corporations of Sheffield, Doncaster, Rotherham and Barnsley. Sheffield Corporation bought the site in 1898 (or 1889 - sources vary) from the Pilkington family, and also purchased a number of local farms which were then abandoned, in order to prevent contamination of the water supply. Work started on constructing the dam, and the dams of Midhope and Underbank Reservoirs, further downstream, simultaneously, and Langsett Reservoir was completed in 1904. It was officially opened on 17 October, and held the largest volume of water of the dams constructed in the Sheffield area. Transport of materials for the construction was aided by the Sheffield Corporation Railway, which ran along the north bank of the river from Stocksbridge. The dam crossed the valley at the eastern end of the reservoir, and Midhope Cliff Lane ran along the top of it. A treatment works and filters were constructed below the dam, and a spillway to maintain flow in the river ran from the northern edge of the dam. Ownership of the reservoir passed to the Yorkshire Water Authority in 1974, and following the passing of the Water Act 1989 and the privatisation of the water companies, it has been owned by Yorkshire Water. The reservoir covers 124 acres (50 ha), the earth embankment that forms the dam is 1,037 feet (316 m) long and a maximum of 115 feet (35 m) high, and it impounds over 1,400 million imperial gallons (6,400 Ml) of water. A new treatment works to replace those at Langsett and Midhope was constructed between 1983 and 1985, and can treat 60 Megalitres of water per day. It supplies drinking water to south-west Barnsley and north-west Sheffield.

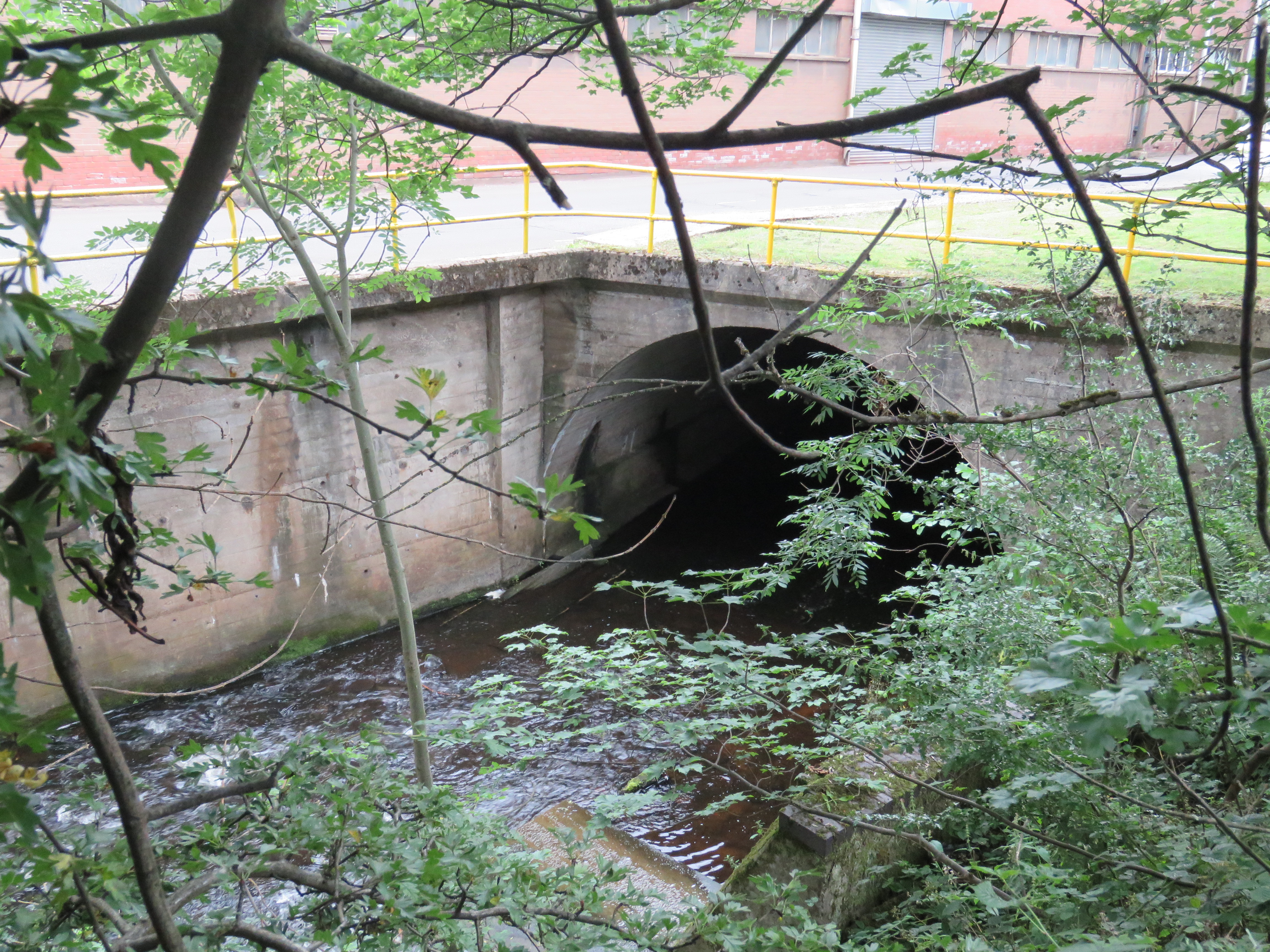
The Little Don entering the 36DD culvert at the western end of Stocksbridge steelworks.

A little further downstream, the Little Don is joined by Hagg Brook, a small stream that is fed by the overflow from Midhope Reservoir. There is another weir in the Little Don at Midhopestones, just before Midhopestones Bridge. This small bridge carried Mortimer Road over the river, and is constructed of coursed gritstone blocks. It has three arches, a large one in the centre and a smaller one at either side. It dates from 1788 and is grade II listed. Underbank Reservoir begins immediately below the bridge. While Langsett and Midhope reservoirs are used for water supply, Underbank provides compensation water for the Little Don and the Don. The volumes of water released were thought to be too high in 2017, as they had historically supplied the many industrial sites further down the Don. There is a spillway from the southern edge of the dam with a weir at the bottom, after which the river is crossed by Unsliven Bridge. A bridge was mentioned at this location in a charter which pre-dates 1290. The bridge that now stands there was erected around 1730, with a main arch and a smaller arch in the north abutment. It formed part of the route between Bradfield and Wakefield, on which traffic increased significantly during the industrial revolution. It was widened twice in the 18th century, and by 1796 was twice as wide as it had been. The northern approach was realigned in 1805, when the bridge became part of the Langsett, Wadsley, and Sheffield Turnpike. A toll bar was erected near the bridge, but was removed in 1838 when the Turnpike was repealed by Act of Parliament. The road to the north of the bridge was realigned as part of the work to build the reservoir dam. It has only been used by local traffic since the Manchester Road was moved further to the north.

The next bridge downstream carries the B6088 road over the river. Below that the course used to meander across its flood plain, but had then been straightened as it ran past Stocksbridge gas works and the iron and steel works, where it fed a small reservoir. By 1931, the steel works had extended much further up the valley, taking over the gas works site, and the river had been diverted into a new channel close to the B6088 road. In parts, it had been culverted, and as the steelworks has expanded, more of it has been diverted into culverts. The culverts are long and large with some short open-air sections, and are known as 36DD by the urban exploring community, probably because both Samuel Fox, the originator of the steel works, and the model Samantha Fox were known as Sam Fox. There is also a small section of culvert below the Fox Valley shopping centre. After emerging into the open again, it is crossed by the Stocksbridge Railway, which runs from Deepcar railway station into the steelworks. It was originally a subsidiary of Samuel Fox and Company but since 1992 it has been owned by the steelworks. It opened on 14 April 1877, and passenger services, which were mainly used by workers at the steelworks and pupils from Penistone Grammar School, ran until 1931. The final bridge carries the A6102 into Deepcar, after which the river flows into the left bank of the River Don.

== Environment ==
The Environment Agency measure the water quality of the river systems in England. Each is given an overall ecological status, which may be one of five levels: high, good, moderate, poor and bad. There are several components that are used to determine this, including biological status, which looks at the quantity and varieties of invertebrates, angiosperms and fish, and chemical status, which compares the concentrations of various chemicals against known safe concentrations. Chemical status is rated good or fail.

The water quality of the Little Don River system, which includes the Hagg Brook, was as follows in 2019.

Section	Ecological Status	Chemical Status	Overall Status	Length	Catchment	Channel
Little Don from Source to River Don	Moderate	Fail	Moderate	7.9 miles (12.7 km)	17.71 square miles (45.9 km^{2})	heavily modified

The river system has not been classed as good quality because of sewage discharges and physical modification of the channel, which restricts the movement of fish. Like many rivers in the UK, the chemical status changed from good to fail in 2019, due to the presence of polybrominated diphenyl ethers (PBDE), perfluorooctane sulphonate (PFOS) and mercury compounds, none of which had previously been included in the assessment.

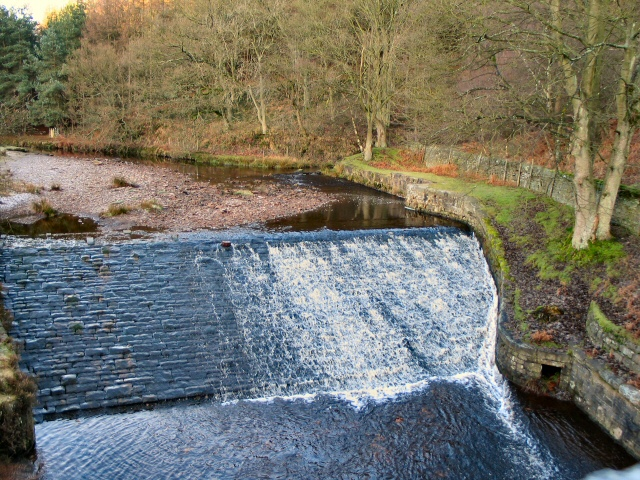
The weir above Langsett Reservoir prevented migration of trout prior to the construction of a fish pass.

As well as barriers to the movement of fish, the river has also been affected by pollution from minewater and by the presence of the invasive species, the New Zealand mud snail. Pollution from minewater has been significantly reduced following the construction of a treatment plant by the Coal Authority. This is located between Langsett and Underbank reservoirs, and the minewater is pumped through it. There is a small amount of minewater which does not get processed by the plant, and a solution for this is being trialled by the Environment Agency, Yorkshire Water, and Highways England. In 2017, Yorkshire Water were assessing the amount of water discharged from the reservoirs into the river, with a view to altering them to more natural levels. Consideration has also been give to removing weirs, or providing fish passes where this is not reasonable. The provision of fish passes around the reservoir dams is not considered to be cost-effective, but installing one on a weir used for industrial water supply on the lower reaches of the river would increase the length of the Little Don accessible to fish from the Don twofold. Another fish pass, just above Langsett Reservoir, enables trout and other fish which were impounded within the reservoir to travel some 3.1 miles (5 km) further upstream. It allows them to negotiate the weir, which was installed to trap gravel before the Little Don entered the reservoir. The fish pass is of the Larinier type, and construction was completed on 19 April 2018.

Prior to the pass being constructed, Yorkshire Water funded a research project, which involved implanting passive integrated transponder tags into fish, and then using fixed telemetry equipment to detect the movement of fish both upstream and downstream across the weirs. Fish from the reservoir were tagged, as were fish from the upper Little Don and Thickwoods Brook. Migration in both tributaries was thought to be impeded, as both have a weir just upstream from the reservoir. In order to provide control data, similar monitoring was carried out at Grimwith Reservoir in North Yorkshire where there are two tributaries with no weirs. The study showed that there was no detectable movement from the reservoir into the tributaries, and less than expected in the downstream direction. This research informed the decision to construct the fish pass on the Little Don.

== Bibliography ==
- EA (October 2017). "Little Don Catchment Case Study" (PDF). Environment Agency. Archived (PDF) from the original on 30 July 2021.
- Wallace, Liam (August 2017). "Movements and population dynamics of brown trout in reservoirs and headwaters". University of Hull. Archived from the original on 30 July 2021.

=== References ===
Media related to Little Don River at Wikimedia Commons
