= Listed buildings in Langsett =

Langsett is a civil parish in the metropolitan borough of Barnsley, South Yorkshire, England. The parish contains 18 listed buildings that are recorded in the National Heritage List for England. All the listed buildings are designated at Grade II, the lowest of the three grades, which is applied to "buildings of national importance and special interest". The parish contains the village of Langsett, and is otherwise almost completely rural. The listed buildings consist of houses, farmhouses and farm buildings, milestones, a wayside cross, a "take off" stone, and a public house.

== Buildings ==
Name and location	Photograph	Date	Notes
Lady Cross; 53.49427°N 1.77777°W		Before 1509	The cross on the Old Salt Road is in millstone grit. It has a square base about 750 millimetres (30 in) across, chamfered corners, and a square socket. A triangular shaft has been inserted later.
Barn, Alderman's Head Cote Farm; 53.50392°N 1.66481°W	—	16th century	The barn is cruck-framed, it has been encased in stone, and has a stone slate roof. There are 3½ internal bays and outshuts. The barn contains square-headed cart entries, doorways with quoined surrounds, and slit vents. Inside there are three cruck trusses.
Barn at Langsett House; 53.50033°N 1.68314°W	—	1621	The barn is in stone with quoins and a stone slate roof. There are five internal bays, and aisles at the front, which contains a central recessed square-headed cart entry. At the rear is a chamfered plinth, a central square-headed cart entry with a quoined surround, and slit vents. In the right gable apex is a ventilation hole with an initialled and dated lintel.
Outuilding south of Lower Belle Clive Farmhouse; 53.50954°N 1.67101°W	—	17th century	The outbuilding, originally a stable, is in stone with quoins and a stone slate roof. There is a single storey and a loft. The building contains doorways, most with triangular heads and quoined surrounds, loft openings, and vents.
Barn north of The Lodge; 53.50010°N 1.68187°W	—	17th century	The barn is in stone on a plinth, with quoins, and a stone slate roof. There are four internal bays and a rear outshut. The barn contains square-headed cart entries and other openings with quoined surrounds, and slit vents with round-arched heads.
Langsett House (south part); 53.50010°N 1.68285°W	—	Early 18th century	A stone house with a tile roof, two storeys and three bays. The windows are double-chamfered and mullioned, with some mullions removed. On the front is a doorway, and at the rear is a blocked doorway with a quoined surround.
House east of Langsett House; 53.50015°N 1.68255°W	—	Early 18th century	A house and a stable combined into a house, it is in stone, and has a stone slate roof with chamfered gable copings on moulded kneelers. There are two storeys, the house had two bays, and the stable had three. On the house is a porch, the windows are mullioned with some mullions removed, and in the stable are three entrances with deep lintels.
Milestone opposite Paw Hill Lane; 53.51072°N 1.68067°W		Mid 18th century (probable)	The milestone is set into a wall on the north side of Hartcliff Road. The stone has a rounded head, and is inscribed with the Roman numerals "XVI". It also has a benchmark.
Lower Belle Clive Farmhouse; 53.50965°N 1.67077°W	—	Late 18th century	A stone farmhouse with quoins, and a stone slate roof with gable copings on moulded kneelers. There are two storeys, a symmetrical front of three bays, and a later single-storey rear wing. In the centre of the front is a doorway with a quoined surround and a deep lintel, and the windows are replacement casements, In the rear wing is a doorway with a re-set initialled and dated lintel.
Take off stone 53.50188°N 1.63019°W		Late 18th century	The stone is built into a wall on the west side of Mortimer Road, and it indicated the point at which horses were taken off wagons. It is a stone with a rounded top, and is incised with "Take off". The stone also has a benchmark.
Milestone in wall of Ring Wood; 53.50991°N 1.65805°W		Late 18th or early 19th century	The milestone is set into the wall surrounding a wood by the side of the old salt route. It is in millstone grit, and consists of a post with a rounded top. The milestone is inscribed with the Roman numerals "XV".
Lower Hand Bank Farmhouse; 53.49464°N 1.64525°W		Early 19th century	The farmhouse, at one time a public house, and later converted as a private house, it is in stone with a sill band, and a Welsh slate roof with coped gables. There are three storeys, a symmetrical front of three bays, and flanking single-storey lean-to wings. The front facing the road has a pedimented gable containing a blind light. In the centre is a doorway with a fanlight, and a cornice on console brackets, and the windows are sashes. At the rear is a round-arched landing window.
Milestone near the Dog and Partridge public house 53.50688°N 1.73025°W		Early 19th century (probable)	The milestone is on the south side of the A628 road. It consists of a stone post with a rounded top, and it is inscribed with the distances to Barnsley and Manchester.
Milestone near the Flouch Inn; 53.51007°N 1.70646°W		Early 19th century (probable)	The milestone is to the south of Old Manchester Road. It consists of a stone post with a rounded top, and it is inscribed with the distances to Barnsley and Manchester.
Wagon and Horses Public House; 53.50048°N 1.68101°W		{1828	The public house is in stone, and has a stone slate roof with coped gables on cut kneelers. There are two storeys and an attic, and a symmetrical gabled front of three bays. The central doorway has a fanlight and a moulded cornice, the windows are sashes, and in the attic is a Venetian window with blind side lights. The surrounds of the windows and doors have chevron tooling.
Delmont Grange; 53.50713°N 1.72510°W	—	19th century	A stone house that has a Welsh slate roof with moulded gable copings on kneelers with carved masks. There are two storeys and three bays, the middle bay projecting slightly. In the centre is a porch with a stepped gable and square embattled corner piers. The doorway has a cambered head and a hood mould, and above it is a canted oriel window over which is a small shield. The central bay is flanked by octagonal embattled turrets. The windows in the outer bays are casements, those in the ground floor with stepped hood moulds.
Milestone near the junction with Mortimer Road; 53.49436°N 1.64457°W		19th century	The milestone on the south side of the A616 road is in stone with cast iron overlay. It has a triangular plan, and a rounded top. On the top is inscribed "WADSLEY LANGSETT & SHEFFIELD ROAD" and "LANGSETT", and on the sides are the distances to Huddersfield, Sheffield and Holmfirth.
Milestone opposite the track to Alderman's Head Cote Farm; 53.49436°N 1.64457°W		19th century	The milestone on the south side of the A616 road is in stone with cast iron overlay. It has a triangular plan, and a rounded top. On the top is inscribed "WADSLEY LANGSETT & SHEFFIELD ROAD" and "LANGSETT", and on the sides are the distances to Huddersfield, Sheffield and Holmfirth.
