= Stocksbridge Town Hall =

Municipal building in Stocksbridge, South Yorkshire, England

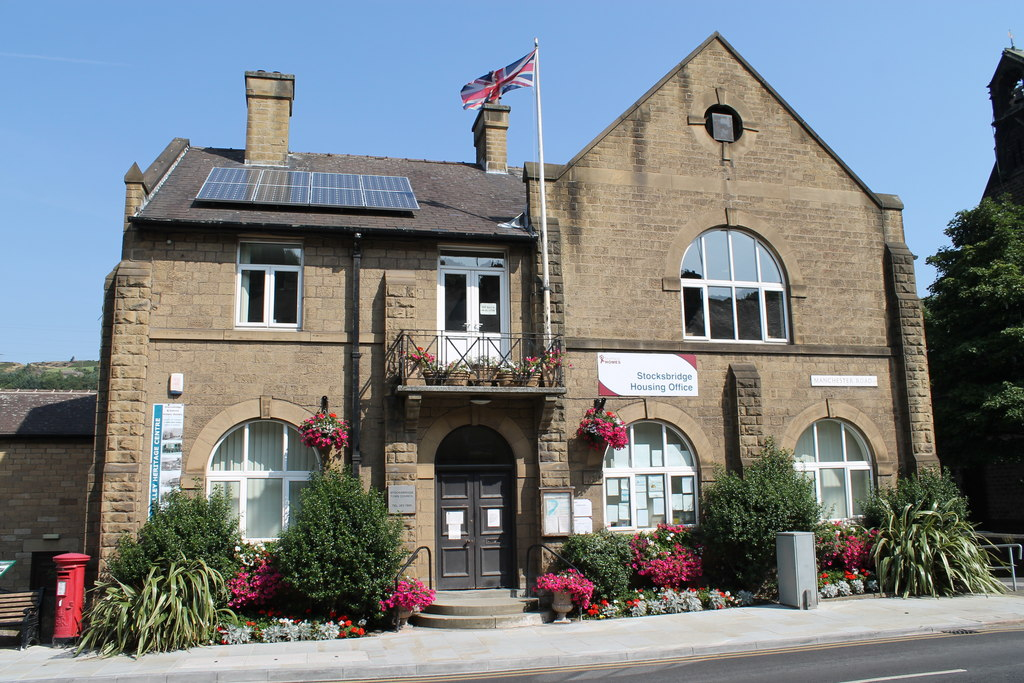
- The building in 2015

- Shown in South Yorkshire
- 53.4818°N 1.5894°W
- Location: Manchester Road, Stocksbridge

History
- Built: 1928

Site notes
- Architect: Henry Maynard Aitchison
- Architectural style: Neoclassical style

Stocksbridge Town Hall is a municipal building in Manchester Road in Stocksbridge, a town in South Yorkshire in England. The town hall, which was previously the offices and meeting place of Stocksbridge Urban District Council, is now the home of Stocksbridge Town Council as well as other community organisations.

== History ==
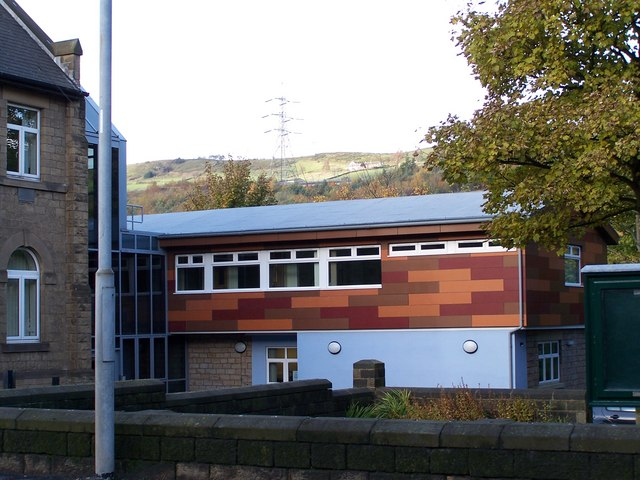
The extension to the building, seen in 2008

After significant industrial growth in the mid-19th century, largely associated with the steel industry, a local board of health was formed in 1872. The local board initially established its offices in a row of terraced cottages sloping down what is now Fox Valley Way. Stocksbridge became an urban district in 1894 and, in the mid-1920s, civic leaders decided to erect a new town hall just to the southeast of the old council offices.

The new building was designed by Henry Maynard Aitchison, the municipal architect and surveyor, in the neoclassical style, built by David Brearley & Sons in ashlar stone and was officially opened on by James Hinchliffe, the chair of the council, on 26 March 1928. The design involved an asymmetrical main frontage of four bays facing Manchester Road. The second bay on the left featured a round headed doorway with voussoirs and a keystone flanked by full-height pilasters constructed in rubble masonry. On the first floor there was a French door, a balcony fronted by iron railings and, on the right-hand side, a flagpole. The left-hand bay was fenestrated by a Diocletian window with voussoirs and keystones on the ground floor and by a casement window on the first floor. The right-hand section of two bays was fenestrated by two Diocletian windows with voussoirs and keystones on the ground floor and by a single Diocletian window with voussoirs and keystones on the first floor, and was surmounted by a gable containing a blind oculus. Internally, the principal rooms were the meeting space and offices for the council and a mortuary. There was also garaging for the local fire service behind the main building.

In the early 21st century, a major programme of works, involving the reconstruction of a 1960s two-storey extension at the rear and the refurbishment of the main building, was initiated. Internal re-modelling allowed the complex to accommodate the offices of Stocksbridge Town Council, Stocksbridge's Future Partnership, and the local police service. The work was carried out by O & P Construction Services at a cost of £700,000 to a design by Service Design Associates and completed in April 2008. The complex subsequently became the home of the Valley History Museum Stocksbridge, featuring a collection of 17th century Bolsterstone Glass and 18th century Stocksbridge Pottery. Works of art in the town hall include three paintings of industrial scenes by the local artist, Robert Penistone.
