= Listed buildings in South Cliffe =

South Cliffe is a civil parish in the county of the East Riding of Yorkshire, England. It contains two listed buildings that are recorded in the National Heritage List for England. Both the listed buildings are designated at Grade II, the lowest of the three grades, which is applied to "buildings of national importance and special interest". The parish contains the villages of South Cliffe and North Cliffe, and the surrounding countryside, and the listed buildings consist of a house and a church.

== Buildings ==
Name and location	Photograph	Date	Notes
Red House; 53.82617°N 0.67251°W	—	Late 18th century	The house is in red brick, with a dentilled brick eaves cornice and a pantile roof. There are two storeys and three bays. The doorway is in the centre, and the windows are sashes, on the ground floor with cambered brick arches, and on the upper floor with flat arches.
St John's Church; 53.82157°N 0.67514°W		1873	The church is in stone, and has a tile roof with raised coped gables, kneelers and a cross finial, and a pyramidal hipped roof. On the ritual west front is a square bell turret with a moulded round-arched opening, and a pyramidal hipped roof. The ritual west front has a pointed doorway, and the windows are lancets.
