= Samuel Fox (industrialist) =

British businessman (1815–1887)

- Samuel Fox on commemorative medal for the opening of 'Fox Glen' public space in Deepcar
- Born: 7 June 1815; Bradwell, Derbyshire, England
- Died: 25 February 1887 (aged 71); North Cliffe, East Riding of Yorkshire, England

Samuel Fox (7 June 1815 – 25 February 1887) was a British industrialist and businessman noted for developing the Paragon umbrella frame, and the founder of a steelworks in Stocksbridge.

== Biography ==
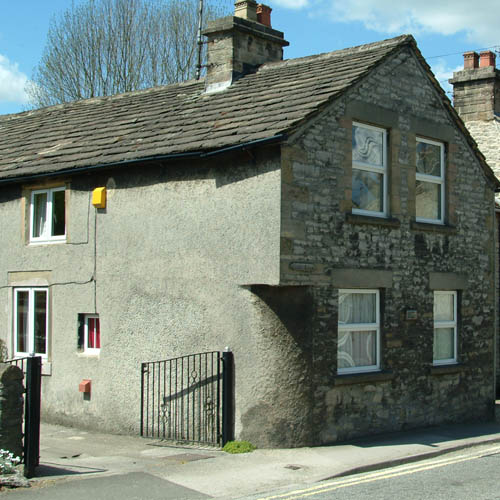
Birthplace of Samuel Fox in Bradwell

Fox was born in Bradwell, Derbyshire, on 7 June 1815, the youngest son of William Fox, a shuttle-weaver, and Mary (née Palfreyman).

In 1831, he started work as an apprentice wire drawer in the firm of Samuel Cocker in Hathersage.

He moved to Stocksbridge in 1842 to establish his own wire-drawing business in a former cotton mill. In 1842, Fox married Maria Radcliffe (born 20 January 1820) at Stannington, Sheffield. They had one son, William Henry Fox (1843–1920) who never married.

In 1851 he and his company Fox Umbrella Frames Ltd developed the "Paragon" umbrella frame, a U section of string steel that was far superior to its competitors. Development of the product continued until at least 1935. A similar product was used to make Crinoline frames from 1855. Umbrellas with 'Fox Frames' were sold worldwide.

The business continued to expand and started producing different products, and by the mid-1860s the works included furnaces and rolling mills. In 1862, Samuel Fox began to produce crucible steel. The company installed two 5-ton Bessemer converters, the process being the invention of Sir Henry Bessemer. In 1863 a rail and billet mill was established, followed by a rod mill in 1864.

A railway line was built to link the steel works with the wider region.

Fox bought the Bradwell Grove Estate, Holwell, Oxfordshire in 1871.

He died on 25 February 1887 and was buried at St John churchyard on his estate North Cliffe, near Market Weighton, East Riding of Yorkshire.

Throughout his life, Fox was a frequent visitor to his home village of Bradwell, and for many years regularly sent money to benefit the poor. These charitable donations were always sent anonymously, and it was only a few years before his death that the actual donor became known to the people, when he also bequeathed a further £1000 for the poor of the parish.

A magnificent church, funded by the Fox family, was built in Stocksbridge overlooking the steelworks following his death. Saint Matthias Church was so named because Samuel Fox died on St. Matthias' Day. Fox himself had planned the church, and the church was completed in his memory under the instruction of his son, William, at a cost of around £5,000. Due to dwindling congregations, the church closed in 2018. Its last permanent vicar was Catherine Barnard.

== See also ==
- Hoyland Fox, an umbrella frame manufacturer founded and formerly based in Sheffield, UK, founded by William Hoyland, assistant to Samuel Fox.
- Samuel Fox and Company
