= South Cliffe =

Village in the East Riding of Yorkshire, England

Coordinates: 53.814366°N 0.673662°W

- Location within the East Riding of Yorkshire
- OS grid reference: SE874361
  - London: 160 mi (260 km) S
- Civil parish: South Cliffe
- Unitary authority: East Riding of Yorkshire
- Ceremonial county: East Riding of Yorkshire
- Region: Yorkshire and the Humber
- Country: England
- Sovereign state: United Kingdom
- Post town: YORK
- Postcode district: YO43
- Dialling code: 01430
- Police: Humberside
- Fire: Humberside
- Ambulance: Yorkshire
- UK Parliament: Goole and Pocklington

South Cliffe is a village and civil parish in the East Riding of Yorkshire, England. It is situated about 2.5 miles (4 km) north of North Cave, 2 miles (3.2 km) west of Newbald and about 3.5 miles (5.6 km) south of Market Weighton. It bestrides Cliffe Road. The parish includes the village of North Cliffe.

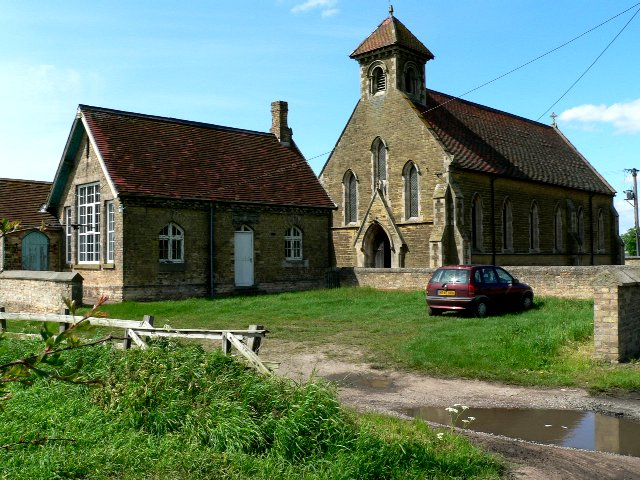
Parish Church of St John, serving North Cliffe and South Cliffe

== Civil parish ==
It covers an area of 1,413 hectares (3,490 acres), according to the 2011 UK census, North and South Cliffe parish had a population of 124, an increase on the 2001 UK census figure of 96. Although the civil parish is called "South Cliffe" its parish council is called "North & South Cliffe Parish Council". On 1 April 1935 North Cliffe parish was abolished and merged with South Cliffe.

== See also ==
- Listed buildings in South Cliffe
