= Steel, Peech and Tozer =

Steel maker

Steel, Peech and Tozer Limited
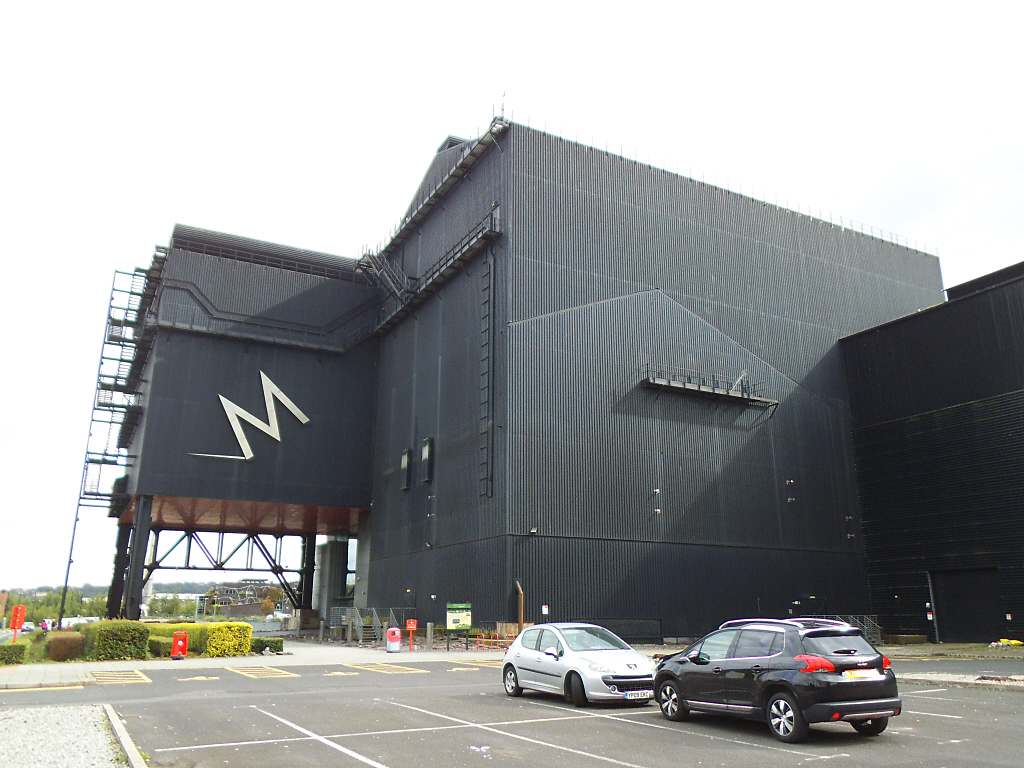
- The remaining part of the former Templeborough melting shop, which now houses Magna Science Adventure Centre.
- Formerly: Steel, Tozer and Hampton Limited (until 1882)
- Type: Division
- Industry: Steel making
- Predecessor: Phoenix Bessemer Steel Company
- Founded: November 1875; 150 years ago in Rotherham, United Kingdom
- Defunct: 1993
- Fate: Closure of Templeborough Melting Shop
- Parent: United Steel Companies (1918–1967); British Steel Corporation (1967–1986); Rotherham Engineering Steels (part of United Engineering Steels Ltd.) (1986-1993)

Steel, Peech and Tozer Limited (SPT, locally also known as Steelo's) was a large steel maker with works situated at Ickles and Templeborough, in Rotherham, South Yorkshire, England. Part of the Templeborough steelworks survives today as the Magna Science Adventure Centre.

== History ==
=== Beginnings ===
==== Early iron working & Ickles Rolling Mill ====
The site in which the steel works would be built has a long history of iron working. Excavations of the Roman fort at Templeborough found evidence of iron working during Roman times. In the medieval period, some of the land in the area was owned by Roche Abbey. During this time water-mills may have been created, powered by water channelled through cuttings off the River Don. After the dissolution of the monasteries, the land was used by the Reresby family. By 1560, two rolling mills had been constructed.

Around 1833, one of the rolling mills was adapted for rolling steel, previously being used to extract vegetable oil from seeds. By this time, a crescent-shaped area along the River Don, stretching from Masbrough through Ickles, had become the home of many of the town's iron and steel works. The area soon underwent development and industrialisation, promoted by the opening of the Midland railway in 1840. By 1871, Ickles Rolling Mill Limited was created to operate the steel rolling mill in Ickles.

==== Phoenix Works ====
Situated between the main turn-pike road linking Rotherham and Sheffield (now called Sheffield Road) and the River Don was built the Phoenix Works, a leading manufacturer of large iron forgings, made using water powered tilt hammers. The works made forgings for marine engines, shafts for use in paddle steamers and crank axles etc.

A separate steel works, utilising the Bessemer process, was set up by Thomas Hampton and Mr. Radcliffe in 1871, located to the north of the River Don. Phoenix took over the works in 1872 - the company was now named Phoenix Bessemer Steel Company Limited. Phoenix also took over Ickles Rolling Mill in 1874.

==== Steel, Peech and Tozer ====
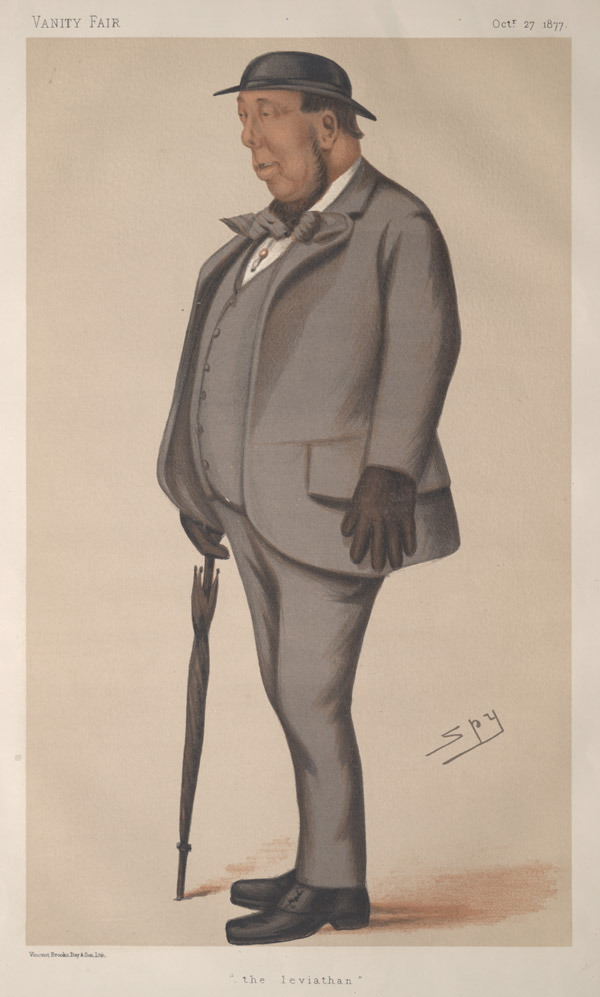
Henry Steel

In 1874, Phoenix entered an agreement with Gilead A Smith & Co. to supply them with 5000 tons of rail. Unfortunately, Gilead A Smith & Co. soon went bust, likely due to the ripple effects of the Panic of 1873. This left Phoenix with more than £14,000 in debt. Later in July 1875, Phoenix went into liquidation but continued to operate with a small profit until October. In November, the company's assets were purchased by Mr Henry Steel for £36,500. Thomas Hampton stayed on as a director, newly joined by Henry Steel and Edward Tozer. Henry Peech also came on board as a director and investor. The new company became known as Steel, Tozer and Hampton Limited.

With the purchase came more investment in the company's production facilities. In 1876 a second melting shop was built, featuring two 2-ton Bessemer converters. This would be supplemented with two larger converters in 1878. A cogging mill and rail mill were added the following year, with material being transferred between them on driven rollers. By 1879 the works could produce up to 2,750 tons of ingots per week, and roll 2,500 tons of rails per week.

Hampton retired at the end of 1882 and the company subsequently changed its name to Steel, Peech and Tozer - a name that would become a giant in steel making.

The steel making plant was further upgraded throughout the 1880s with the addition four open hearth furnaces, creating what was known as the Rotherham Melting Shop. The processing plant increased with the addition of cogging mills, rail mills and specialist plant for the manufacture of steel springs and railway axles. The furnaces were replaced with larger furnaces from 1906.

=== World War I and II ===
Templeborough Melting Shop
- Operated: Around 1915 - 1993
- Industry: Steel
- Defunct: 25 November 1993

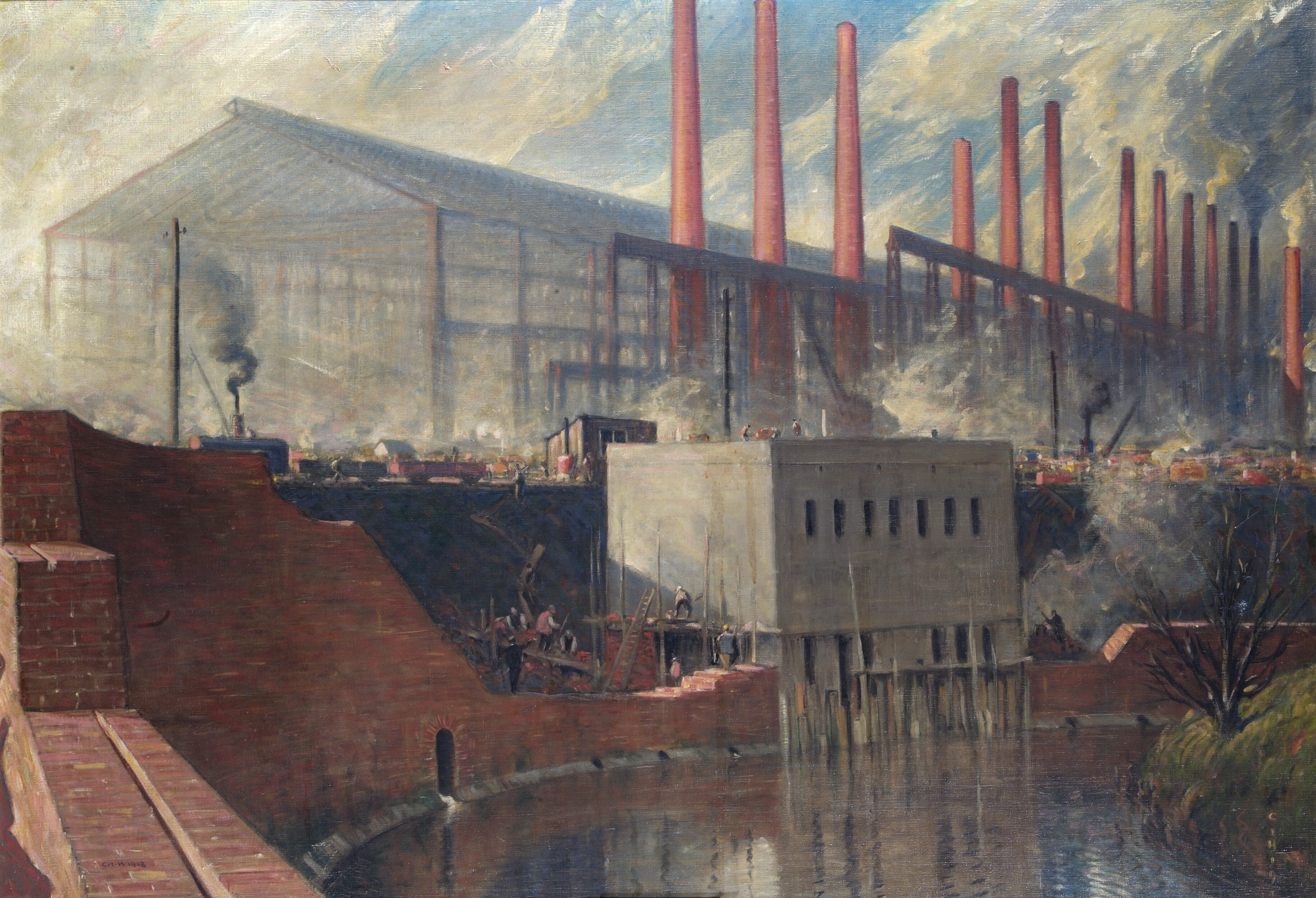
Steel works built for Steel, Peech and Tozer during World War I (painting by Charles Holmes)

==== World War I and the construction of Templeborough Melting Shop ====
In 1914, following the outbreak of the First World War many iron and steel companies began producing casings and steel for munitions. In this case the work was added to the normal production, which included many component orders for the military.

The Ickles site was proving too small to handle the production, and with steel in such demand, the company extended their works towards the Sheffield boundary, to occupy a site between the main Sheffield to Rotherham road and the Great Central Railway line. The new Melting Shop and Rolling Mills were built over the site of the old Roman fort at Templeborough. The Templeborough Melting Shop, when opened, was the largest melting shop of its type in Europe and contained 14 open hearth furnaces where steel scrap was melted down.

==== Merger into United Steel Companies ====
Following the end of hostilities in 1918, Steel, Peech and Tozer joined with Samuel Fox and Company of Stocksbridge and the Appleby-Frodingham Steel Company of Scunthorpe to form United Steel Companies.

==== World War II ====
During World War II, again, many iron and steel works produced munitions for the war effort, not only munitions but sections for the construction of Bailey bridges, an important assistance to the Allied troops in Italy and following the D-Day landings. Because of its size and known war effort involvement the Templeborough was a prime target for the Luftwaffe.

=== Post-war expansion and modernisation ===
Since the end of the Second World War many industrial companies in South Yorkshire faced problems due to the decline in the need for their products. The large steel producers within the United Kingdom, including United Steel Companies, were nationalised in 1951 under the Labour government. Just two years later, the new Conservative government began de-nationalising the companies, with a two-thirds share of Templeborough Rolling Mills being sold for $3 million.

==== Project SPEAR ====
By the 1950s Templeborough's open hearth furnaces were in need of replacement and the United Steel Companies set about the task of updating its melting facilities. Plans were announced in July 1959 under the name “Project SPEAR” (Steel Peech Electric Arc Reorganisation), which would replace the 14 open hearth furnaces at Templeborough (and 7 in the neighbouring Rotherham works) with 6 modern electric arc furnaces. Construction began in December 1960, with the first furnace commissioned on 13 September 1962. All of the furnaces were commissioned on schedule, with last completed on 1 February 1965. In 1969, the shop produced a record 1.4 million tonnes of steel that year. When completed Templeborough Melting Shop became the world's largest electric arc steel making plant with a capability of producing 1.8 million tons per year.

==== Brinsworth Hot Strip Mill ====
At the end of the Second World War there was an increase in demand for steel products such as sheet, plate and strip due to improved living standards. As products became relatively cheap the demand grew for such items as refrigerators, canned foods and cars. SPT had a Strip Mill, which could satisfy some of this demand. It had been producing strip to a maximum width of 230 mm since 1921, however the limitation in the maximum width and site restrictions prevented extension, enlargement or modernisation of the plant. A new mill was required which would cater for the increased demand, and to this end market research was carried out to determine the size and potential of the market.

When the technical and commercial research was concluded, it was decided to build a continuous Hot Strip Mill rolling mild, carbon and special steels up to 457 mm. This new mill filled the gap between the narrow and wide strip mills operating at that time. So in July 1955 it was announced that Brinsworth Hot Strip Mill would be built on Sheffield Road opposite Templeborough Melting Shop at a cost of £3.6 m. In less than two years it was built and the first slabs rolled on 10 June 1957, quite an achievement. Full capacity was expected to be 8000 tonnes per week and in 1956 there were new orders for two to three years. These orders were mainly for the motorcar, bicycle, tube and stamping industries and nearly all of them for the home market.

When building a new plant such as Brinsworth it was necessary to ensure that there would be a good supply of raw material. The ingots produced were rolled to blooms and then slabs in the Templeborough Cogging Mill. The slabs were then delivered to Brinsworth by train on one of the six rail tracks laid. The majority of these tracks have been lifted although there is still evidence on the plant of the old railway system.

Outputs steadily increased and a second shift was added by the middle of December 1957. By September 1959, 143,258 tonnes of coils had been produced. Soon records were set and in 1973 the Hot Mill achieved its highest throughput of 425,000 tonnes in one year. This reflected the boom in industry in the early 1970s. During this period other records were set. Tommy Walker produced 1,099 tonnes on a shift on 25 January 1974, which also gave a daily record of 2,815 tonnes produced. November 1972 saw the highest production for one week at 11,486 tonnes.

=== Nationalisation and decline ===
Nationalised again in 1967, the works became part of British Steel Corporation. It was yo-yo time within the industry, the works was privatised and became known as Rotherham Engineering Steels, returning to become part of British Steel again and, in due course part of a take-over by the Anglo-Dutch company Corus.

With the installation of a continuous casting machine in the early 1980s there was something of a revival in the fortunes of the works, however, this was not to last. By 1986, as few as one of the arc furnaces may have been in operation at Templeborough - most of the others had been moved to Aldwarke works. The Templeborough steelworks ceased operations in 1993.

== Sport ==
The company had its own football team, which was prominent in the pre-Second World War era.

In 1932, some workers founded the Phoenix Golf Club after getting permission to create a golf course on some former farmland. The club is still going to this day.

== Redevelopment ==
=== Magna ===
The melting shop was not demolished but, after a period of "sleep", was to become the Magna Science Adventure Centre, one of the more successful of the Millennium projects. The surrounding site is being redeveloped as a Business park.

=== Templeborough Biomass Power Plant ===
Part of the site previously owned by Arconic (formerly Alcoa, formerly Firth Rixson), to the west of Riverside Nature Park, has since been redeveloped as a 40 MW biomass power station fuelled by waste wood constructed by a joint venture between Interserve Construction Limited and Babcock & Wilcox, Volund.
