= Geoff Denial =

English footballer (1932–2020)

Personal information
- Date of birth: 31 January 1932
- Place of birth: Stocksbridge, England
- Date of death: 24 March 2020 (aged 88)
- Position: Defender

Senior career*
| Years | Team | Apps | (Gls) |
| 1952–1955 | Sheffield United | 10 | (0) |
| 1955–1963 | Oxford United | 167 | (43) |
| 1963–???? | Rugby Town | | |
- * Club domestic league appearances and goals

Geoff Denial (31 January 1932 – 24 March 2020) was an English footballer who played for Sheffield United, Oxford United and Rugby Town. During his spell at Oxford, he played 199 games in all competitions. He was called up during the Suez Crisis before he made his debut for Oxford United.
