= Deepcar railway station =

Disused railway station in South Yorkshire, England

Deepcar
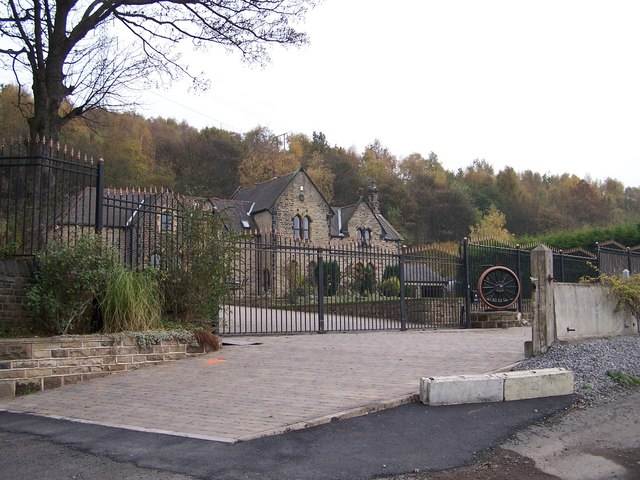
- The former Deepcar station, now a private residence

General information
- Location: Deepcar, City of Sheffield; England
- Coordinates: 53.4765°N 1.5590°W
- Grid reference: SK293978
- Platforms: 2

Other information
- Status: Disused

History
- Pre-grouping: Sheffield, Ashton-under-Lyne and Manchester Railway; Great Central Railway
- Post-grouping: London and North Eastern Railway; London Midland Region of British Railways

Key dates
- 14 July 1845: Opened
- 15 June 1959: Closed
Location

Deepcar railway station, originally "Deep Car", is a disused railway station near Deepcar, South Yorkshire, England. The station, situated on the line built by the Sheffield, Ashton-under-Lyne and Manchester Railway, opened on 14 July 1845. The station was located between Oughtibridge and Wortley and was intended to serve the village of Deepcar, near Sheffield, South Yorkshire. In 1899 the route became part of the Great Central Railway main line from London Marylebone to Manchester.

The station was built with two flanking platforms, the main station building being on the Manchester-bound side with a waiting shelter on the other. In the 1870s a short branch line was constructed to serve the Stocksbridge steelworks of Samuel Fox and Company. This line ran from the west end of Deepcar station to a set of sidings, where traffic was exchanged with the Stocksbridge Railway. At the west end of the station, to the rear of the main line platform, there was a short bay known as the Stocksbridge platform from where passenger trains to the station at Stocksbridge (also known as Stocksbridge platform) departed. This service, which commenced in 1877, ceased in 1931.

The station closed to passenger traffic on 15 June 1959. The line, albeit single track from Woodburn Junction, is still open to serve the steelworks, which was operated by the speciality steels division of Liberty House Group. In 2025 a winding up order was granted to creditors owed hundreds of millions of pounds by Speciality Steels UK (part of the Liberty Steel group). Staff were put on furlough on reduced wages and steel production was put on hold. In September 2026 the UK government announced plans to nationalise Speciality Steels UK. The railway to the steel works remains in place (in 2026) but has not been used for two years.

As of 2025, there are plans to reopen Deepcar station as a calling point on a tram-train extension of the South Yorkshire Supertram network between Sheffield Victoria and Stocksbridge town centre.

Preceding station	Disused railways	Following station
Wortley	British Railways; Great Central Main Line	Oughty Bridge
Stocksbridge	Stocksbridge Railway	Terminus
