= Langsett =

Village and civil parish in South Yorkshire, England

Coordinates: 53.50°N 1.68°W

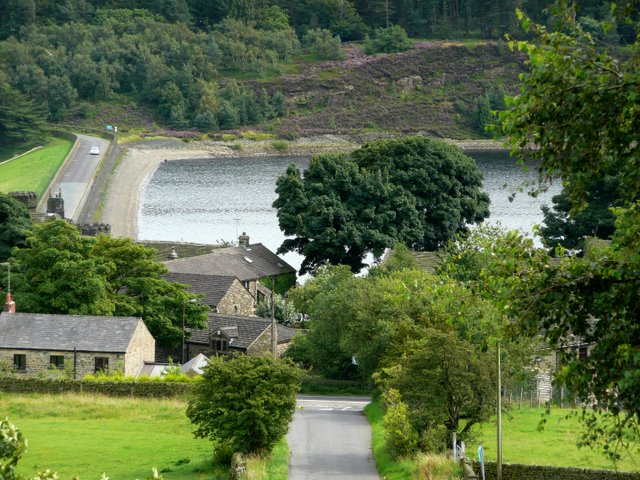
- View from Gilbert Hill

- Location within South Yorkshire
- Population: 222 (2011)
- Civil parish: Langsett
- Metropolitan borough: Barnsley
- Metropolitan county: South Yorkshire
- Region: Yorkshire and the Humber
- Country: England
- Sovereign state: United Kingdom
- Post town: SHEFFIELD
- Postcode district: S36
- Dialling code: 01226
- Police: South Yorkshire
- Fire: South Yorkshire
- Ambulance: Yorkshire
- UK Parliament: Penistone and Stocksbridge

Langsett is a village and civil parish in the Metropolitan Borough of Barnsley, South Yorkshire, England. It lies on the edge of the Peak District National Park. At the 2001 census it had a population of 161, increasing to 222 at the 2011 Census.

The name Langsett derives from the Old English langsīde meaning "long hill slope".

In the early medieval period, Langsett was known as Penisale. It held a royal charter entitling it to hold a weekly market on Tuesdays and an annual three-day fair, but these were held somewhere in the country rather than in the village itself. The market charter was later used to start a market in Penistone.

A tradition associates the location of Penisale market with a cross near the junction of Cross Lane and Hartcliffe Road. This theory is rejected by Neville T. Sharpe, who holds that this was a wayside cross used as a guide by travellers.

In chronostratigraphy, the British sub-stage of the Carboniferous period, the 'Langsettian' derives its name from a study of geological exposures in the banks of the Little Don River near Langsett.

Langsett was historically part of the West Riding of Yorkshire in the Wapentake of Staincross, an area that almost corresponds with the modern day Metropolitan Borough of Barnsley.

The Peak District Boundary Walk runs through the village.

== See also ==
- Listed buildings in Langsett
