= Neepsend railway station =

Disused railway station in South Yorkshire, England

Neepsend
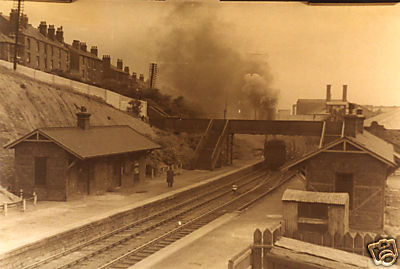

General information
- Location: Neepsend, City of Sheffield; England
- Coordinates: 53.398050°N 1.482780°W
- Grid reference: SK344891
- Platforms: 2

Other information
- Status: Disused

History
- Pre-grouping: Manchester, Sheffield and Lincolnshire Railway; Great Central Railway
- Post-grouping: London and North Eastern Railway

Key dates
- 14 July 1888: Opened
- 28 October 1940: Closed
Location

Neepsend railway station was a railway station on the former Great Central Railway in England.

== History ==
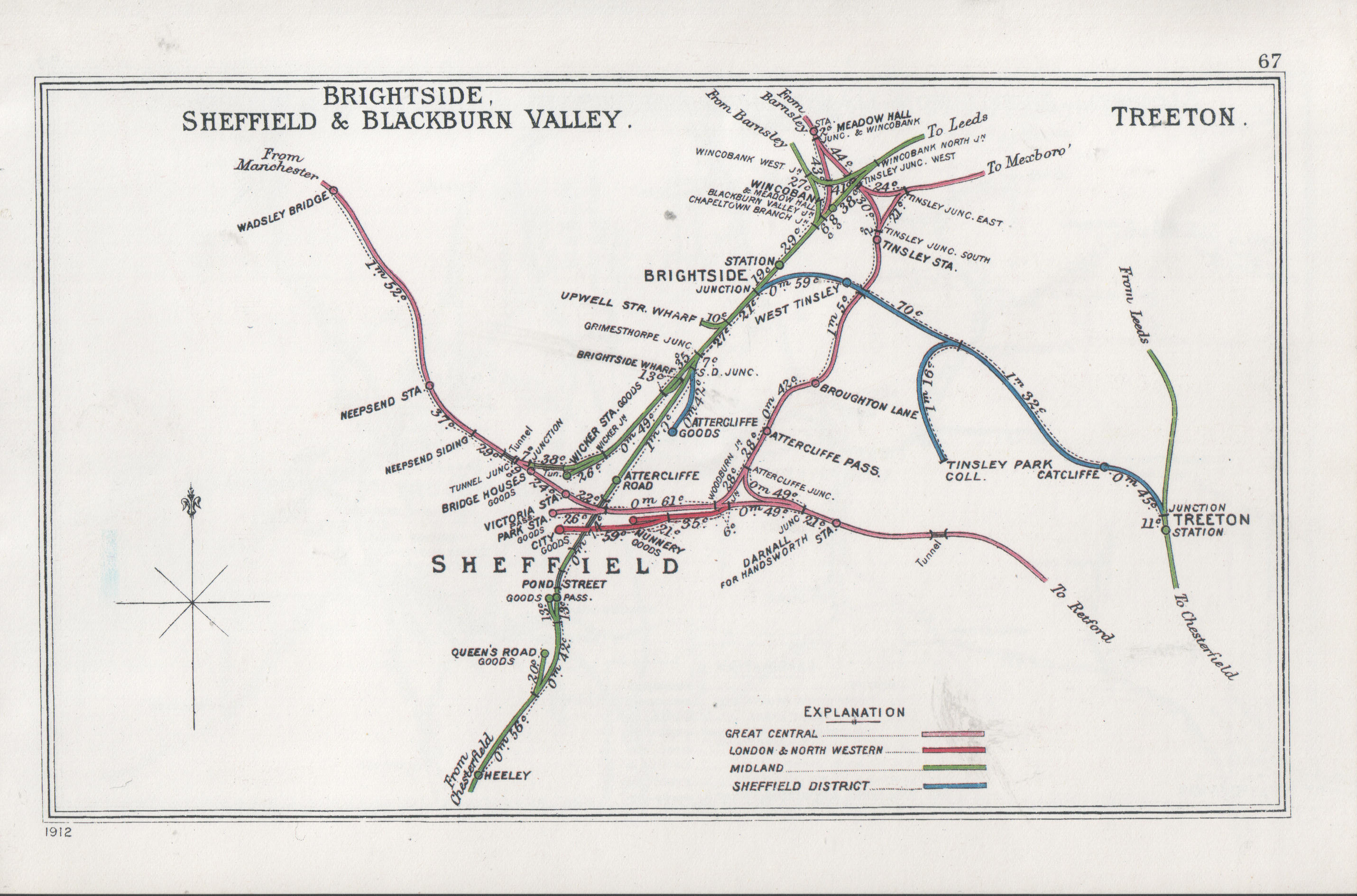
Railway Clearing House map showing Neepsend Station

Neepsend railway station was opened on 1 July 1888 to serve the industrial suburb of Neepsend, to the north-west of Sheffield city centre. It was situated on the Manchester, Sheffield and Lincolnshire Railway's (latterly the Great Central Railway) Woodhead line which connected Sheffield Victoria and Manchester London Road stations and was located to the north-west of Neepsend engine shed. There had been much local pressure over a long period of time to get a station at Neepsend; in December 1857 the mayor of Sheffield was told that it would be too expensive. Four years later, local activists were informed that their latest petition would be granted if they could raise £211 (equivalent to £20,782 in 2023), this being half the cost of providing the station. The building of the station was further delayed when a dispute arose about who should pay the cost of constructing a road bridge across the River Don to give access to the planned station. The cost of the bridge was eventually covered by Sheffield Corporation and the station duly opened in 1888.

The station consisted of two flanking platforms joined by a footbridge which also served to carry a footpath over the railway. The platforms were both served by small buildings in the pre-double pavilion style used by the MS&LR. It was unusually located, the Sheffield-bound (up) platform being built against the face of a cutting, whilst the opposite platform (down) saw a long drop to street level. A signal box, narrow based but opening out above the stock loading gauge, was located at the Sheffield Victoria end of the 'down' platform.

== Present ==
Due to low public usage of the station, caused by the better sited Corporation tramway services, it was closed to passengers on 28 October 1940 although the buildings and the signal box remained in situ until the 1970s. All traces of the original station have now been removed, with even the footbridge replaced in 2002 with a new structure. However, the station entrance is visible but claimed by the vegetation.

As of 2025, there are plans to reopen the line between Sheffield Victoria and Stocksbridge as part of the South Yorkshire Supertram network, which would see tram-trains passing through and potentially calling at Neepsend.

Preceding station	Disused railways	Following station
Wadsley Bridge	Great Central Railway; Great Central Main Line	Bridgehouses
