= Hoyland Fox =

British umbrella frame manufacturer

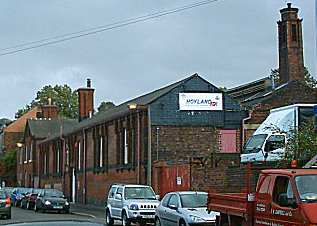
The Hoyland Fox factory on Valley Road in September 2004 with its characteristic square chimney.

Hoyland Fox is an umbrella frame manufacturer founded and formerly based in Sheffield, UK.

== History ==
Samuel Fox founded Fox Umbrella Frames Ltd in 1842 in Stocksbridge, Sheffield, UK. Fox Umbrella Company started with a rain umbrella product. Samuel Fox is the first inventor of the U-shape ribs (called "Paragon"). William Hoyland, assistant of Samuel Fox, built his own company William Hoyland Ltd in 1875. Hoyland and Fox’s Chief engineer Joseph Hayward set up business to produce the patented "Flexus" frame as an alternative to Fox' "Paragon" frame. The "Flexus" frame is built up of solid ribs with flat spring stretchers coupled in pairs and in such a manner that all the stretchers were under tension when the frame was in any position except when fully closed.

Samuel Fox became the largest umbrella frame manufacturer in the world around the turn of last century. The company went on to be one of the largest steel makers in UK before being nationalised by British Steel. In late 1987, Readicut International bought William Hoyland and Co. Ltd from local owners. One year later, Hoyland acquired Fox Umbrella Frames Ltd and established the present company Hoyland Fox Limited.

The Activa Group acquired Hoyland Fox Ltd in 2008 and transferred the brand name, patents, technology, tools and machinery to its China factory ending 166 years of Sheffield tradition.

== Sites ==
Until the acquisition by Activa, the group was based at the following locations.

- Manchester Road, Millhouse Green, Barnsley
- Valley Road, Meersbrook, Sheffield
- Stocksbridge, Sheffield
