= Wadsley Bridge railway station =

Disused railway station in South Yorkshire, England

Wadsley Bridge
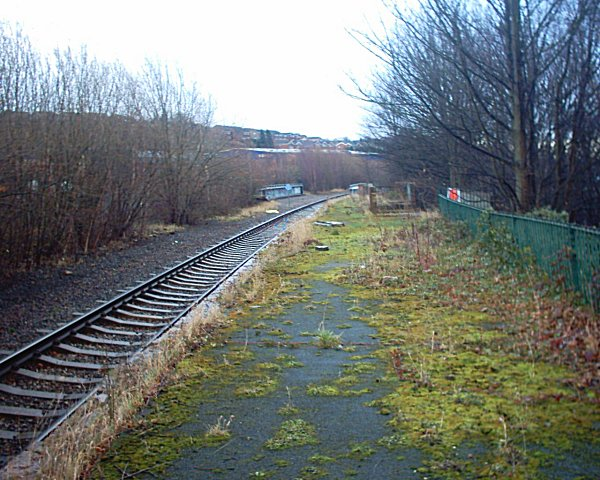
- Wadsley Station in January 2005.

General information
- Location: Wadsley Bridge, City of Sheffield; England
- Coordinates: 53.418880°N 1.499170°W
- Grid reference: SK334915
- Platforms: 2

Other information
- Status: Disused

History
- Pre-grouping: Sheffield, Ashton-under-Lyne and Manchester Railway; Great Central Railway
- Post-grouping: London and North Eastern Railway; London Midland Region of British Railways

Key dates
- 14 July 1845: Opened
- 15 June 1959: Closed to regular passenger services
- 8 January 1994: Last used by football specials
- 2 March 1997: official complete closure date
Location

Wadsley Bridge railway station was a station in Sheffield, South Yorkshire, England on the Great Central Railway's core route between Manchester and Sheffield.

== History ==
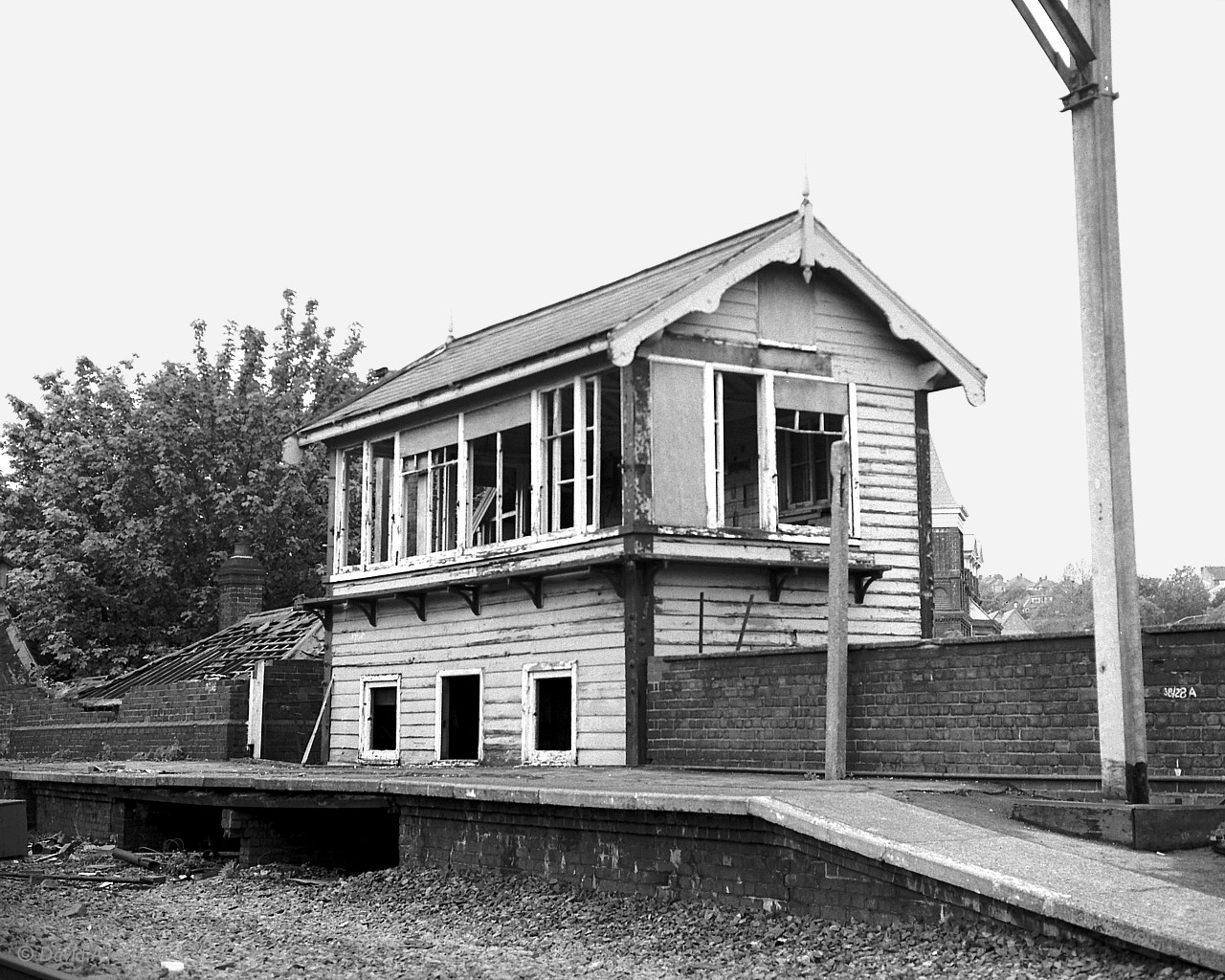
Wadsley Bridge signal box on 6 June 1987

The station opened on 14 July 1845 as part of the then Sheffield, Ashton-under-Lyne and Manchester Railway, on its original route from Bridgehouses in Sheffield (soon superseded by Sheffield Victoria) to Manchester London Road. This route became more popularly known as the Woodhead Line. The station stood on the north side of Halifax Road between Neepsend and Oughtibridge stations.

The station closed to regular passenger service on 15 June 1959, with the Woodhead Line itself closing to passengers in 1970. However, Wadsley Bridge railway station still saw occasional passenger use. summer specials were advertised until 31 October 1965, Between 15 and 19 February 1979, British Rail temporarily reopened the station (along with Dronfield and the Midland Main Line platforms at Dore) because road transport throughout Sheffield had been brought to a standstill by heavy snowfall. All Sheffield–Huddersfield trains served the station during that period, and a special single fare of £0.16 was charged. Sheffield–Huddersfield passenger trains continued to run through the station until 1983 and football specials used the station until 1994, serving Sheffield Wednesday's Hillsborough Stadium. Official closure took place in 1997 after which the station platforms were abandoned.

== Present ==
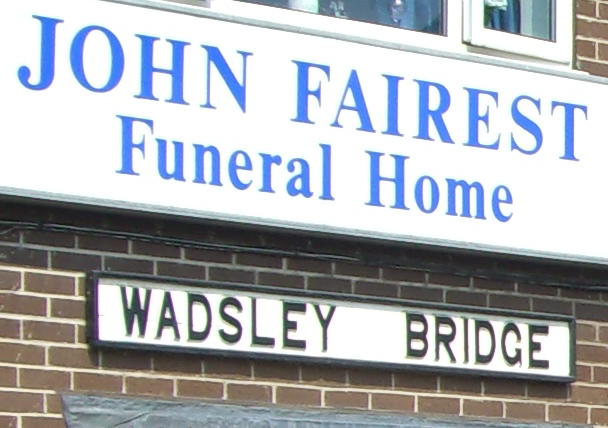
Old station sign at John Fairest Funeral Home.

The station buildings survived until final closure, but have since been demolished. The two platforms remain, however they are in a visibly poor condition. Passing through the station is the single line from Sheffield to Stocksbridge - this has been retained for occasional freight workings to steel mills in Stocksbridge.

An old station sign, almost certainly from the signal box, can be seen attached to the adjacent John Fairest Funeral Home (see picture). In 2008 the weighbridge was removed and reconstructed at Levisham railway station on the North Yorkshire Moors Railway.

As of 2025, there are plans to reopen the line between Sheffield Victoria and Stocksbridge as part of the South Yorkshire Supertram network, which would see tram-trains passing through and potentially calling at Wadsley Bridge.

Preceding station	Disused railways	Following station
Oughty Bridge	British Railways; Great Central Main Line	Neepsend
