= Deepcar =

Village in South Yorkshire, England

Coordinates: 53.474°N 1.570°W

- Village
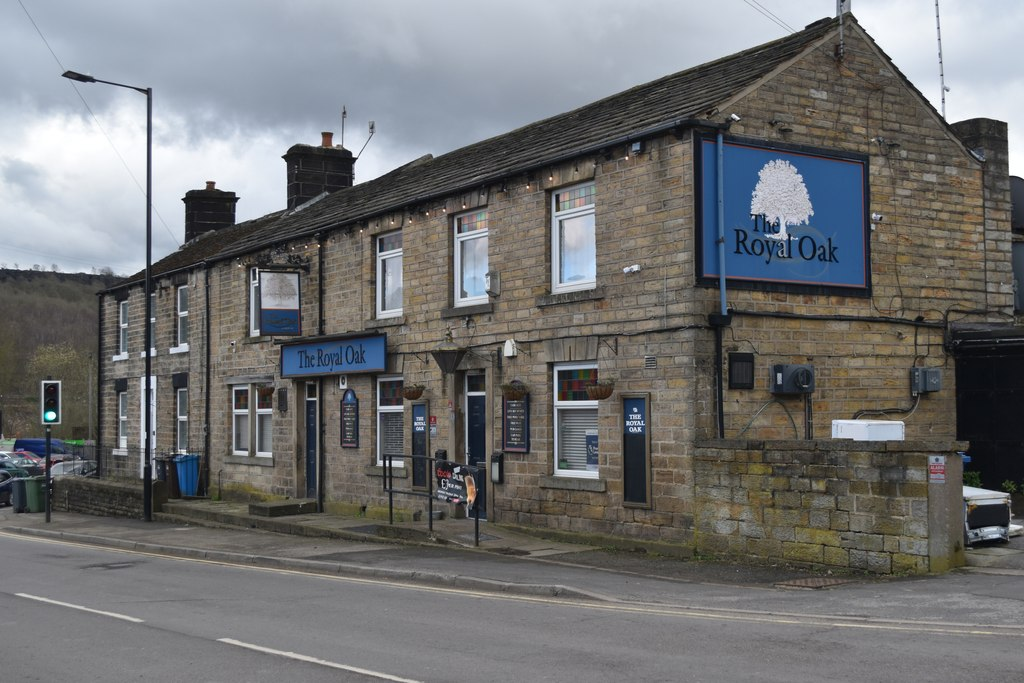
- The Royal Oak

- Location within South Yorkshire
- OS grid reference: SK285975
- Civil parish: Stocksbridge
- Metropolitan borough: Sheffield
- Metropolitan county: South Yorkshire
- Region: Yorkshire and the Humber
- Country: England
- Sovereign state: United Kingdom
- Post town: SHEFFIELD
- Postcode district: S36
- Dialling code: 0114
- Police: South Yorkshire
- Fire: South Yorkshire
- Ambulance: Yorkshire
- UK Parliament: Penistone and Stocksbridge

Deepcar is a village located on the eastern fringe of the town of Stocksbridge, South Yorkshire, England. It is in the electoral ward of Stocksbridge and Upper Don, 10 miles (16 km) south-west of Barnsley town centre and 9.5 miles (15.3 km) approximately north-west of Sheffield city centre.

== Geography ==
The village lies south-west of the confluence of the River Don and Little Don River, and near to the junctions of the A616 road and A6102 roads, and the former junction of the 'Woodhead Line' (Sheffield to Penistone section, built for the Sheffield, Ashton-under-Lyne and Manchester Railway) and private Stocksbridge Railways; the village was served by the Deepcar railway station from 1846 to 1959.

== History ==
The Deepcar archaeological site, which included a structure or 'house', dating to the Mesolithic period, and ascribed to the Maglemosian culture was excavated in 1962 close to the junction of the Don and Little Don at Wharncliffe Wood. (grid reference SK 2920 9812). The site's culture has similarities to Star Carr in North Yorkshire, but gives its name to unique "Deepcar type assemblages" of microliths in the archaeology literature.

A potential Romano-British settlement has also been identified near the river banks.

The parish church of St John the Evangelist was opened in 1878.

== See also ==
- Listed buildings in Stocksbridge
