= Oughty Bridge railway station =

Disused railway station in South Yorkshire, England

Oughty Bridge
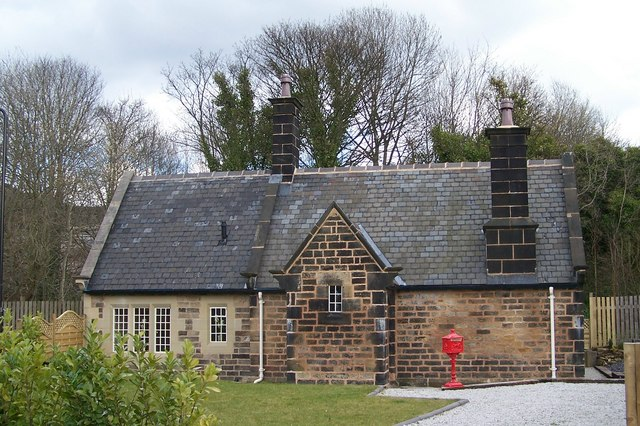

General information
- Location: Oughtibridge, City of Sheffield; England
- Coordinates: 53.437°N 1.532°W
- Grid reference: SK311934
- Platforms: 2

Other information
- Status: Disused

History
- Pre-grouping: Sheffield, Ashton-under-Lyne and Manchester Railway; Great Central Railway
- Post-grouping: London and North Eastern Railway; London Midland Region of British Railways

Key dates
- 14 July 1845: Opened
- 15 June 1959: Closed
Location

Oughty Bridge railway station was a railway station on the Sheffield, Ashton-under-Lyne and Manchester Railway built to serve the village of Oughtibridge, Sheffield, South Yorkshire, England.

The spelling Oughty Bridge was used throughout the life of the station, despite the village name being spelt Oughtibridge.

The station, which lies between Wadsley Bridge and Deepcar was opened on 14 July 1845 and closed on 15 June 1959. The old station house is a grade two listed building constructed from gritstone and has been used for industrial purposes for a number of years. In 2008 it was renovated and converted into a house. When the station was still in use, the goods sidings were used for carrying wood pulp to the nearby paper mill and also freight to and from the Oughtibridge silica works.

As of 2025, there are plans to reopen Oughtibridge station as a calling point on a tram-train extension of the South Yorkshire Supertram network between Sheffield Victoria and Stocksbridge town centre.

Preceding station	Disused railways	Following station
Deepcar	British Railways; Great Central Main Line	Wadsley Bridge
