= Samuel Fox and Company =

Company in Stocksbridge, South Yorkshire, England

Samuel Fox and Company was a company operating a major steel complex built in the Upper Don Valley at Stocksbridge, near Sheffield, South Yorkshire, England.

== History ==
Samuel Fox bought a disused corn mill close by the centre of the town in 1842 and made alterations so that he could produce wire for the manufacture of textile pins. Within 6 years the business began to manufacture wire for umbrella frames and he developed his own variant, the “Paragon” in 1851. Expansion continued and by the mid-1860s furnaces and rolling mills had been built and the production of railway lines and springs begun.

Road transport in the area was difficult and with larger products being manufactured a new outlet was required. In the 1870s a short branch line was built to link the works with the Manchester, Sheffield & Lincolnshire Railway at Deepcar. This was known as the Stocksbridge Railway which was a subsidiary of the main company until the early 1990s. The line was still open in 2018 and handles regular traffic to and from the works.

== Rationalisation ==
Samuel Fox & Company joined with Steel, Peech & Tozer of Rotherham and Scunthorpe-based Appleby-Frodingham Steel Company to form the United Steel Companies after the First World War. Products from various sites were coordinated, each works specialising in a particular range. At Stocksbridge they specialised in special steels, particularly the various grades of stainless steel.

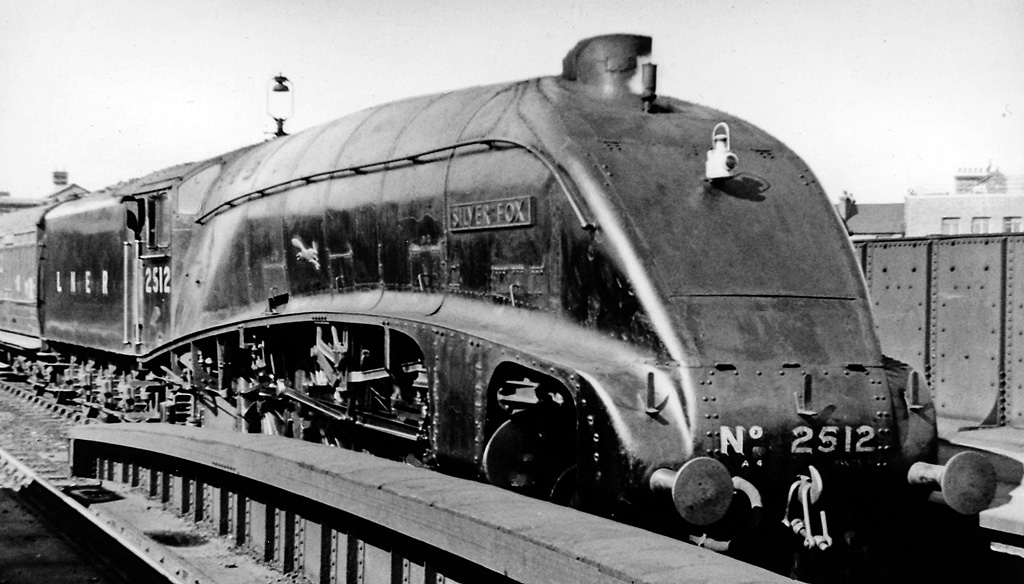
LNER no. 2512 Silver Fox showing the stainless steel fox motif in the centre of the boiler side

In 1935, the company provided a pair of stainless steel foxes to the London & North Eastern Railway which were used to decorate the sides of their new Class A4 locomotive no. 2512 Silver Fox.

The iconic stainless steel Fox weather vane was made by Trevor Faulkner ARCA FRBS, his first commission, whilst he was a student at the Royal College of Art in the 1950s. Trevor Faulkner, who was elected a Fellow of the Royal Society of British Sculptors in 1975, grew up in Stocksbridge and family members worked at Samuel Fox.

== Nationalisation and after ==
The works, along with other major producers in Great Britain, were nationalised in 1967, to become British Steel Corporation. During the 1980s and 1990s the works became part of a joint British Steel / GKN venture known as "Stocksbridge Engineering Steels" and in 1999 they became part of Corus. The works is still open although steel stock is brought from the main melting site at Aldwarke, near Rotherham, for secondary processing.

In 2007 the site was bought by Tata Steel and has been renamed Tata Steel Speciality Steels. Investment at the site has continued and a high-tech Vacuum Induction Melting furnace was due to be commissioned early in 2015.

Liberty House Group Purchased the Speciality Steels group from TATA in May 2017. The name adopted for the new group was Liberty Speciality Steels. The group comprised the Site at Aldwarke, Bolton, Brinsworth, Stocksbridge and Wednesbury.

In 2025 a winding up order was granted to creditors owed hundreds of millions of pounds by Speciality Steels UK (part of the Liberty Steel group). Staff were put on furlough on reduced wages. In September 2026 the UK government announced plans to nationalise Speciality Steels UK.
