= Stocksbridge =

Town and civil parish in South Yorkshire, England

Coordinates: 53.478°N 1.588°W

- Town and Civil Parish
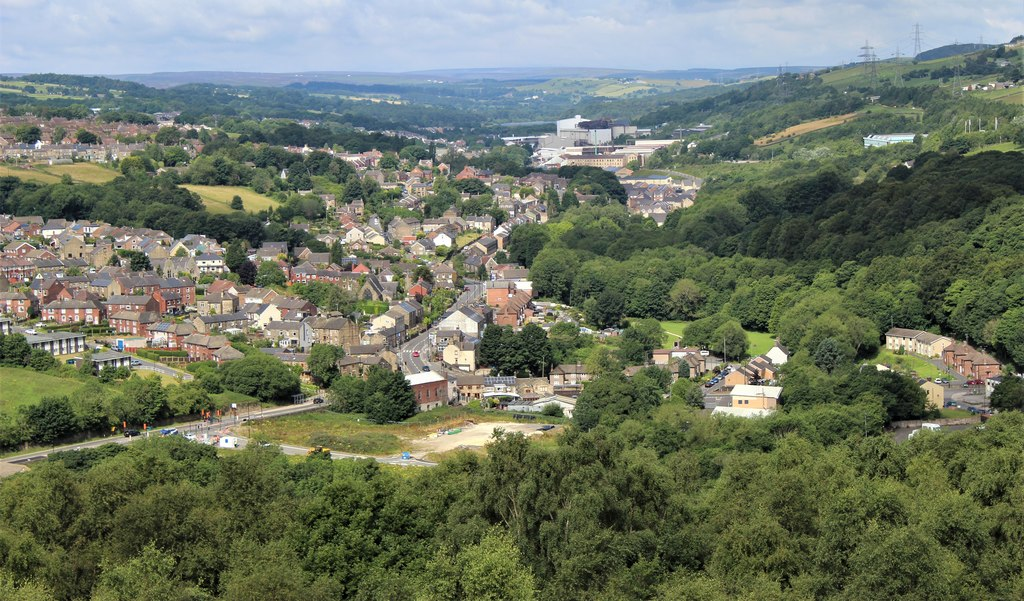
- Skyline

- Location within South Yorkshire
- Population: 9,869 (2017 SCC)
- Civil parish: Stocksbridge
- Metropolitan borough: Sheffield
- Metropolitan county: South Yorkshire
- Region: Yorkshire and the Humber
- Country: England
- Sovereign state: United Kingdom
- Post town: SHEFFIELD
- Postcode district: S36
- Dialling code: 0114
- Police: South Yorkshire
- Fire: South Yorkshire
- Ambulance: Yorkshire
- UK Parliament: Penistone and Stocksbridge

Stocksbridge is a town and civil parish, it is encircled to the north and east by the southern edge of the Metropolitan Borough of Barnsley, although since 1974 it lies within the borders of the City of Sheffield, in South Yorkshire, England. The town is approximately 9 miles (14 km) from Barnsley and 10 miles (16 km) from Sheffield.

Historically part of the West Riding of Yorkshire, it lies just to the east of the Peak District. The town is located in the steep-sided valley of the Little Don River, below the Underbank Reservoir. It blends into the areas of Deepcar, Bolsterstone and the eastern end of Ewden valley around Ewden village, which are also within the civil parish. The population of the civil parish as of the 2011 census was 13,455.

== Early history ==
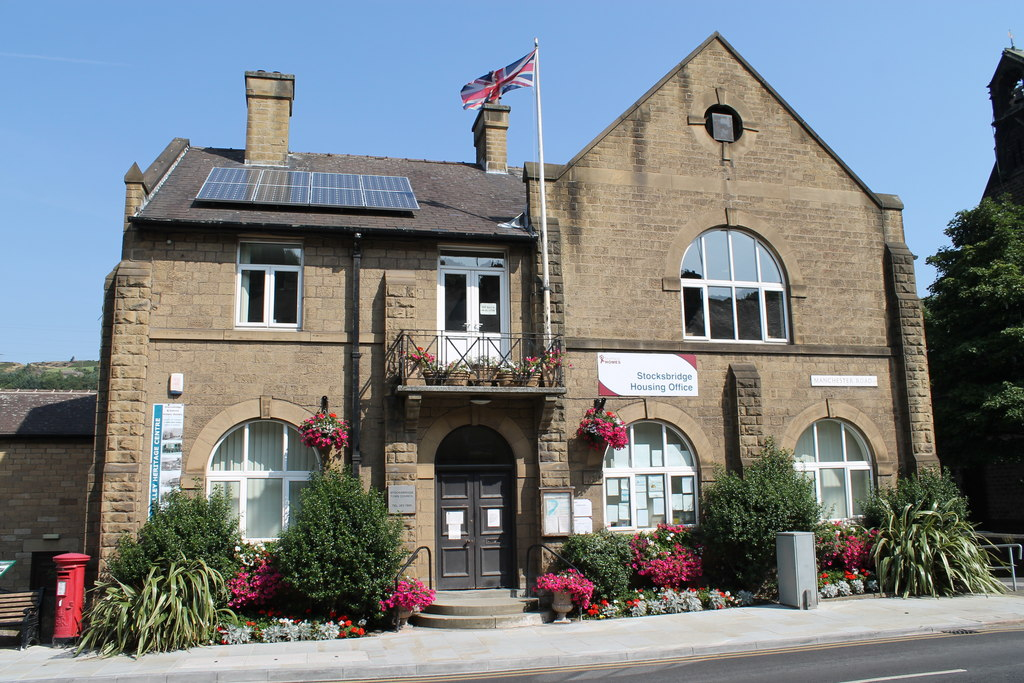
Stocksbridge Town Hall

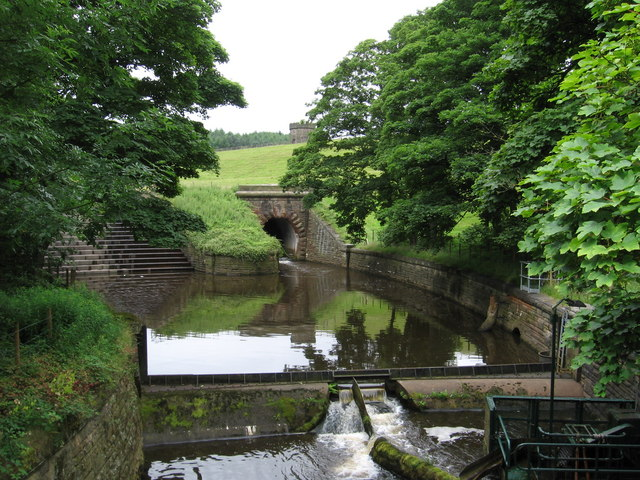
The Little Don

Until the early 18th century, what is now Stocksbridge was a deciduously wooded valley, running from Midhopestones at its northwestern extremity to Deepcar at its southeastern end. A river, originally called the Hunshelf Water and later renamed the Little Don, ran through the valley. This river was also, unofficially, called the Porter, probably on account of its peaty colour. A dirt road, connecting Sheffield with Manchester, ran through the woods adjacent to the river. There were a few stone houses in the valley and a sprinkling of farms on each hillside.

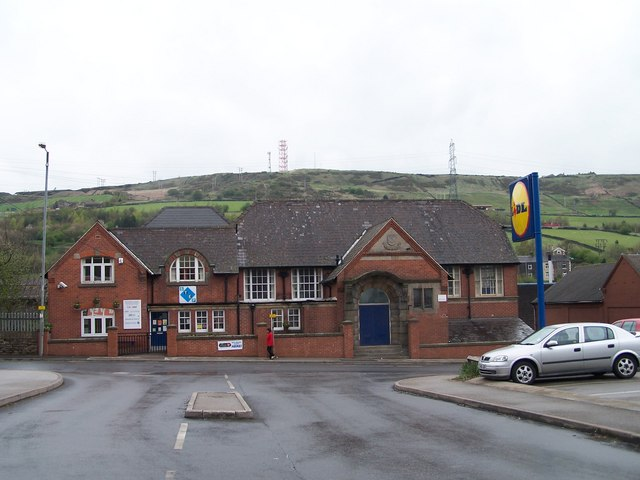
The works institute

In 1716 John Stocks, a local farmer and landowner, occupied a fulling mill halfway along the valley where a flood plain, created by meltwater at the end of the last ice age, extended southwest from the river. Here he reputedly built a footbridge over the river, perhaps so that his workforce could reach the mill from their homes on the north side. This originally wooden structure, Stocks' Bridge, gave the place its name, not only because it was about the only thing there apart from the mill itself, but also because as a crossing place it appeared under that name on Thomas Jeffrey's map of 1772, so establishing itself as a place name. On various occasions, this bridge was destroyed by flooding, and it was eventually replaced by a stone structure in 1812.

In 1794 three businessmen, Jonathan Denton, Benjamin Grayson and Thomas Cannon, built a large cotton mill extremely close by, or possibly upon, the site of the original mill.

The parish church of St Matthias was consecrated in 1890.

Stocksbridge historically straddled the large parishes of Penistone and Ecclesfield. In 1872 a local government district called Stocksbridge was created, governed by an elected local board. Such districts were converted into urban districts in 1894. The current Stocksbridge Town Hall was constructed in 1928. The district was merged into the City of Sheffield in 1974.

== Steel industry ==
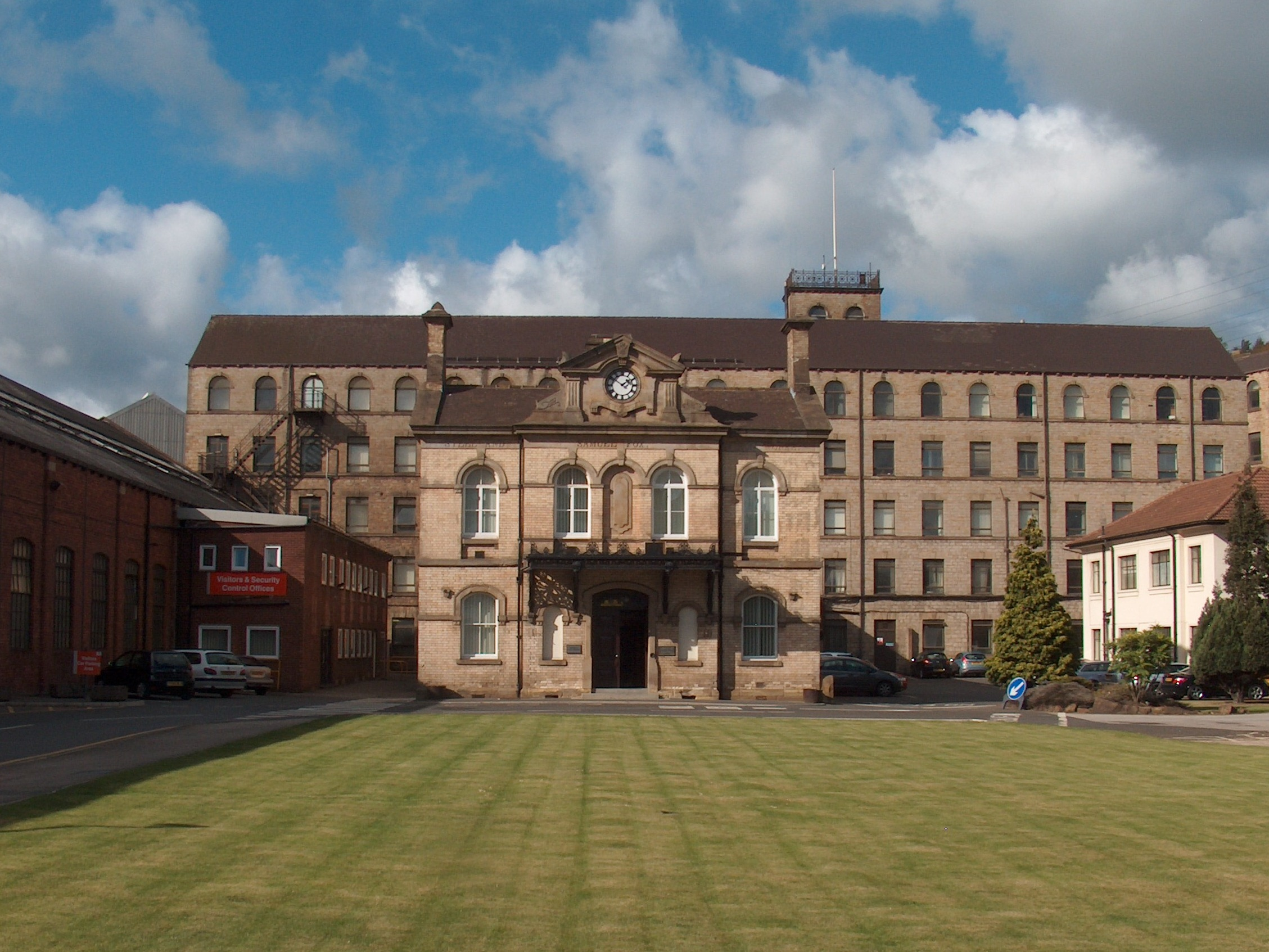
Buildings of Samuel Fox's works. The large structure in the background is the original cotton mill.

The valley bottom today is almost entirely occupied by steel works. Samuel Fox acquired the old cotton mill in 1842, at first renting it from its then owner, Joshua Newton. Nine years later, in 1851, he purchased the mill outright from Joshua's son, Thomas Newton. Fox converted the place to use as a wire mill, and built much of the infrastructure of Stocksbridge, primarily to house his new workforce and to supply their needs. The wire was initially for textile pins, but around 1848 the business expanded to include wire for umbrella frames which led to Fox developing the “Paragon” umbrella frame in 1851.

The business continued to expand, and extended into different products, but underwent a major change in direction in the early 1860s when Fox realized that he could save large amounts of money by making his own steel for the wire, rather than buying it in. Furnaces and a rolling mill were installed, which in turn allowed the production of railway lines and springs. The business was incorporated into a limited company in 1871.

Between 1872 and 1877 a railway line was built to link the works with the Manchester, Sheffield and Lincolnshire Railway at Deepcar railway station. This was the Stocksbridge Railway, which existed as a subsidiary company until 1992. Although the Sheffield to Manchester route via the Woodhead Tunnel was closed to traffic in 1981, a single-track section from Sheffield to Stocksbridge via Deepcar remains to serve the steel works.

Samuel Fox & Co joined Steel, Peech and Tozer at Templeborough to form the United Steel Companies (USC) following the First World War. From then on the products of the USC sites were coordinated so that each works specialised in set products. Fox’s specialised in special steel produce such as spring steel and stainless steels. This developed into the manufacture of high-quality steel for the aviation industry. One specialised department assembled and tested springs for Rolls-Royce cars.

During the Second World War, 'Sammy Fox's' Steelworks was kept busy as part of the war effort. During the Sheffield Blitz by the Luftwaffe, the bombers used the dam at the end of Stocksbridge as a turning point for their run back toward Sheffield.

Following nationalisation in 1967, the British Steel Corporation split the stainless steel departments off into a separate business which by 2004 had become part of Outokumpu.

During the 1980s and 1990s, the Stocksbridge works was part of the United Engineering Steels group (a joint venture between British Steel and GKN) and was known as "Stocksbridge Engineering Steels".

In 1999 the works were taken over by Corus and are part of the Corus Engineering Steels (CES) group. Although for several years Corus ran at a loss, it returned to profit, in part helped by a rise in demand for steel caused by Chinese economic activity.

Steel manufacture in Stocksbridge had always been by melting iron and steel firstly in crucibles (from 1860), then Bessemer converters (from 1862) and Siemens Open Hearth Furnaces (from 1899 until 1968) and lastly Electric arc furnaces (from 1939 until 2005). Iron has never been produced from iron ore at Fox's, by any method.

In October 2006, Corus was taken over by the Indian company Tata. Corus Engineering Steels (Stocksbridge site) was renamed Tata Steels Speciality. During the 2008 recession Stocksbridge works reduced its workforce and output, focusing on producing lower quantities of high-value product for the aerospace and oil and gas markets. After the recession the company returned to profitability and began investing once again. In 2011 £6.5 million was invested in boosting the site's ability to produce aerospace steel, and further developments were planned for 2013.

In December 2015 Tata came under investigation by the Serious Fraud Office in connection with the alleged falsification of certificates guaranteeing the quality of its speciality steels. This was then followed in early 2016 by an announcement from Tata that they would be selling their entire steelmaking interests in the UK, due, they said, to crippling electricity prices in the UK which are more than double the price in the European Union and in other competing countries, and to large volumes of cheap steel which are being exported to the west by China. If a buyer could not be found, then steelmaking in the Stocksbridge valley would finally end, after almost 160 years.

On 9 February 2017 it was announced by Tata and by the Liberty House Group, that the latter had purchased Tata's entire UK steelmaking operation for GBP 100 million. This has secured the continuation of steelmaking in the Stocksbridge valley. In May 2021 Liberty Steel Group put the Stocksbridge business up for sale, a consequence of the collapse of Greensill Capital in March 2021.

In 2025 a winding up order was granted to creditors owed hundreds of millions of pounds by Speciality Steels UK (part of the Liberty Steel group). Staff were put on furlough on reduced wages. In September 2026 the UK government announced plans to nationalise Speciality Steels UK.

== Transport ==
The main road from Sheffield to Manchester passed through the town until the A616 Stocksbridge bypass opened in 1988. The new road links the M1 motorway at Junction 35A (and J36) to the A628 (which is one of the main trans-Pennine routes from Sheffield to Manchester) bypassing the towns of Stocksbridge and Deepcar, diverting the steelworks traffic away from passing through the town.

Stocksbridge has bus services that connect the town to Sheffield City Centre, Middlewood tram stop and Barnsley Interchange. The 57/57A (operated by Stagecoach Yorkshire) runs every 30 minutes. The 57 serves Unsliven Bridge (the western part of the town) to Sheffield City Centre, and the 57A serves Stocksbridge Leisure Centre and Worrall to Sheffield City Centre. Service 201 (operated by South Pennine Community Transport) runs hourly connecting Stocksbridge to Chapeltown. Service 23/23A (South Pennine Community Transport) connects Stocksbridge to Millhouse Green hourly, and Barnsley twice a day. Smaller services, such as the 34 and the 26 (also operated by South Pennine Community Transport), serve Northern College to Barnsley Interchange and Penistone, respectively.

A railway line runs from Stocksbridge to Sheffield via Deepcar, but is currently used only for steel freight trains. Proposals are regularly made to re-open it as a passenger line.

== Culture ==
The British Steel Stocksbridge Band [sic] is credited with performing "Slaidburn" in the trailer of the 1997 film The Full Monty. Stocksbridge Engineering Steels Brass Band has since been renamed to Unite the Union Band. Deepcar Brass Band remains locally.

Nearby Bolsterstone is home to a well-known male voice choir, particularly noted for its performances of Sheffield local carols.

Stocksbridge has a strong amateur theatre group called Steel Valley Beacon which produces Shakespeare and other plays every year.

Mathcore band Rolo Tomassi were formed and are still based in Stocksbridge. Some of the Arctic Monkeys, and the vocalist of Bring Me the Horizon, are from Stocksbridge and attended Stocksbridge School.

== Media ==
Local news and television programmes are provided by BBC Yorkshire and ITV Yorkshire. Television signals are received from the Emley Moor and the local relay TV transmitters.

Local radio stations are BBC Radio Sheffield on 104.1 FM, Greatest Hits Radio Yorkshire on 102.0 FM, Heart Yorkshire on 107.7 FM, Capital Yorkshire on 105.1 FM, Hits Radio South Yorkshire on 102.9 FM and Penistone FM on 95.7 FM.

The town is served by the local newspaper Look Local Newspaper.

== Sport ==
The town's local football club, Stocksbridge Park Steels, was founded in 1986 following the merger of Stocksbridge Works and Oxley Park FC. Their home ground is Bracken Moor, located at the eastern end of the town. The club plays in the Northern Premier League Division One East and also organises many youth teams, for ages 8 to 18.

Stocksbridge Church was the first to represent the town in the FA Cup, in 1910.

== Notable residents ==
- Samuel Fox, industrialist and businessman, founder of Samuel Fox and Company and Fox Umbrella Frames Ltd.
- Geoff Denial, professional footballer for Sheffield United and Oxford United, was born in Stocksbridge.
- Peter Eustace, former Sheffield Wednesday midfielder, manager, and 1966 FA Cup Final player, was born in Stocksbridge.
- Oli Sykes, vocalist of Bring Me the Horizon and owner of Drop Dead Clothing, grew up in Stocksbridge and attended Stocksbridge High School.
- Chris Wilder, former Sheffield United player (1986–1992 and 1998–1999) and manager (2016–2021, 2023–), was born in Stocksbridge.

== See also ==
- Listed buildings in Stocksbridge
