= Listed buildings in Midhopestones =

Midhopestones is a village which forms part of the parish of Bradfield, in the City of Sheffield, South Yorkshire, England; here defined as the part of the parish in the Stocksbridge and Upper Don ward and the S36 postcode area. The area contains 23 listed buildings that are recorded in the National Heritage List for England. Of these, one is listed at Grade II*, the middle of the three grades, and the others are at Grade II, the lowest grade. The area is to the northwest of the city of Sheffield, and contains the village of Midhopestones, the hamlets of Upper Midhope and Wigtwizzle, and a large area of countryside, much of which is moorland.

The listed buildings consist of farmhouses and associated buildings, houses, a toll cottage, an inn, a smithy, a bridge, and a guide post.

== Key ==
Grade	Criteria
II*	Particularly important buildings of more than special interest
II	Buildings of national importance and special interest

== Buildings ==
Name and location	Photograph	Date	Notes	Grade
Cowhouse at Midhope Hall Farmhouse; 53.49203°N 1.64958°W	—	14th century (probable)	The building originated as a Mediaeval courthouse. It has been heavily altered, including major rebuilding in the 20th century, becoming a cowhouse with a hayloft above, and is now a seven bay building with two storeys. It has a cart entrance and four cowhouse doors.	II
Barn at Well Bank Farm; 53.49302°N 1.67426°W	—	17th century (probable)	A single storey cruck framed building with walls of gritstone. The attached cowhouse has a hayloft above it. It is five bays long, with a large cart entrance, and a stone paved threshing floor.	II
Dwarriden Cruck Barn; 53.45663°N 1.61235°W		17th century (probable)	The cruck framed barn has internal timber framing and sandstone walls. The west wall has two buttresses, while the south wall has been shortened, and its gable was rebuilt in the 20th century.	II
Old Booth Farmhouse; 53.45261°N 1.62760°W		Mid 17th century	The building has two storeys and originally had two rooms on each floor. It is built of sandstone, and the original mullioned first floor windows survive. There is a later extension, and an attached farm building of later date.	II
Wellbank Farmhouse and cottages 53.49314°N 1.67462°W	—	17th century	Originally a single farmhouse, the building is partly cruck framed. The original range has two storeys and is two bays deep, and retains an original central inglenook fireplace, and mullioned windows at the rear. A two bay 18th century addition lies to the left of the original range, and a further one bay 19th century extension to its left. The building has been divided into three houses.	II
House on Miller Lane; 53.49263°N 1.64274°W	—	Mid to late 17th century	The gritstone building is of two storeys, and has two rooms on each floor. The original door and central chimney stack survive, but the windows have been altered, and the other two chimney stacks are later additions.	II
New House; 53.49102°N 1.64324°W	—	Mid to late 17th century	The two storey gritstone rubble building originally had two rooms on each floor, with a small addition on the north-east side. The building retains its original oak front door, which is harr hung. It now lies within a 19th century addition. Two original mullioned windows survive, as do back-to-back stone fireplaces and a stone staircase.	II
Rocher Farmhouse; 53.45570°N 1.59298°W		1667	The sandstone farmhouse has two storeys, and originally had a baffle entry. Several original windows survive. There is an attached barn of slightly later date, which has since been partly converted for living accommodation, with its large cart entrance filled in.	II
Manor Farmhouse; 53.49311°N 1.67826°W		1671	The core of the building is cruck framed and has stone walls. It has a baffle entry and early mullioned windows. A wing was added in the 18th century, and it retains an original staircase.	II
The Oaks Farmhouse; 53.49012°N 1.64094°W	—	Late 17th century	The gritstone building has a two room plan. It was probably refaced in the 18th century, and has two mullioned windows on each floor, an da central chimney stack. There is a modern garage extension.	II
Barn and cowhouse at The Oaks Farm; 53.49011°N 1.64026°W	—	17th or 18th century	The cowhouse is the older part of the building, and is partly timber framed. It has a hayloft and two entrances, one partly collapsed. The threshing barn was added in the early 19th century. It has four doors, two large and two small, and also has a pigeon ledge.	II
Town Head Cottages; 53.49298°N 1.67864°W	—	Late 17th or early 18th century	Originally a single farmhouse, since divided into two cottages. It is a two storey gritstone building with an L-shaped plan. Some original mullioned windows survive, as does the central doorway.	II
St James' Church; 53.49203°N 1.64727°W		1705	Believed to be of Mediaeval origin, the church was rebuilt in 1705, and the interior largely survives from this period. The pulpit is 17th century, and the porch has an early oak door. The building has a king post roof	II*
Barn, cowhouse and forge on Miller Lane; 53.49281°N 1.64247°W	—	Early 18th century	The gritstone building is largely single storey, with a central hayloft, and a brick extension to the rear. In the 19th century, the building was partly converted to a forge, and many of the openings were altered.	II
Garlic House Farmhouse; 53.46974°N 1.64019°W	—	Early to mid 18th century	A two storey, two bay stone building. A rear wing was added at a later date. The ground floor windows retain mullions, though these have been removed on the first floor.	II
Guide Pillar on Penistone Road; 53.44945°N 1.63241°W		1740	A 3 foot high gritstone pillar with painted direction arrows and a benchmark. Inscriptions give the distances to Penistone, Hope, Sheffield and Bradfield.	II
Club Inn; 53.49236°N 1.64412°W		Late 18th century	A pub, now renamed as Ye Olde Mustard Pot, built in gritstone and two storeys tall. There is a 19th century extension at the rear, with a cart entrance which has been blocked, and a single-storey 20th century extension.	II
Smithy on Mortimer Road; 53.49044°N 1.64273°W		Late 18th century	The building is constructed of gritstone rubble, with little mortar. It is a single storey building, with a workshop at the rear. The windows and doors were reconstructed in the 20th century, and the chimney stacks at each end have also been rebuilt.	II
Stonecroft Cottage; 53.49118°N 1.64895°W	—	Late 18th century	The gritstone building is of two storeys and has two rooms on each floor. Each floor has two mullioned windows, one either side of the door. Each gable has a stone chimney stack.	II
Toll Bar Cottage; 53.49436°N 1.64517°W		Late 18th century	A single storey building of coursed rubble, with a stone slate roof and two chimney stacks, one of brick and one of stone. The original toll booth window now has 20th century casements.	II
Midhopestones Bridge; 53.49392°N 1.64469°W	—	1788	The gritstone bridge has one large arch, and a small semicircular arch either side. On each side, there are rounded, domed, cutwaters.	II
Broomhead Hall Stable Block; 53.46186°N 1.63431°W	—	1831	A mostly two storey sandstone building, with a U-shaped plan and a castellated front facing the now-demolished Broomhead Hall. There is a central tower, over a large cart entrance, and further paired cart entrances at each outer bay. There is a cowhouse and former barn attached at the rear.	II
Milestone, Manchester Road; 53.49432°N 1.64451°W		Late 19th century	The milestone on Manchester Road is in stone with a cast iron overlay. It has a triangular plan, and a rounded top. On the top is inscribed "WADSLEY LANGSETT & SHEFFIELD ROAD" and "LANGSETT", and on the sides are the distances to Huddersfield, Sheffield and Holmfirth.	II
