= Listed buildings in Stocksbridge =

Stocksbridge is a town and civil parish in the City of Sheffield, South Yorkshire, England. The parish contains 38 listed buildings that are recorded in the National Heritage List for England. All the listed buildings are designated at Grade II, the lowest of the three grades, which is applied to "buildings of national importance and special interest". The parish is to the northwest of the city of Sheffield, and in addition to Stocksbridge contains the villages of Bolsterstone and Deepcar.

The listed buildings consist of houses and associated structures, guideposts and milestones, a bridge, stocks, a telephone box, and a war memorial.

== Buildings ==
Name and location	Photograph	Date	Notes
Porters Lodge, Bolsterstone Castle; 53.46744°N 1.59278°W		Medieval	The building is constructed of gritstone, and has been associated with the demolished Bolsterstone Castle. Its door and window are Mediaeval, but it was remodelled in the 19th century. In the gable is a reset Mediaeval mask. A 19th-century plaque dates the building to around 1250.
Cruck-framed house south of Windhill Farmhouse; 53.48208°N 1.63064°W	—	16th century (possible)	A cruck framed building with walls of gritstone rubble and a stone slate roof. It has two storeys and is a bay-and-a-half long. Most of the openings were later altered, although there is a three-light mullioned window in the east gable. It was later converted into a cowhouse and hayloft, and then became disused, with both gables partially collapsing.
Pot House Farm Cottages; 53.47807°N 1.60031°W	—	16th century (possible)	The building originated as a two-bay cruck framed cottage, with gritstone walls. This section is 1 1/2 storeys high, and retains its original oak floorboards. In the 17th century, a crosswing was added, and this was extended in the early 18th century, a stone fireplace surviving from this period. Around 1800, a further wing was added to the crosswing, with a symmetrical gabled front.
Castle Cottage; 53.46746°N 1.59208°W		16th or early 17th century	Constructed in gritstone as a two-storey house, associated with Bolsterstone Castle, in the 19th century it was extended to become a pair of houses, but they have since been knocked into a single house again. Some of the windows are original, but the front door and other windows date from the 19th and 20th centuries.
Barn at 17 Broomfield Court; 53.47790°N 1.58537°W	—	Early 17th century	The older part of the barn is cruck framed, and has gritstone dry walling. The right-hand part of the building was reconstructed in the 18th century, using coursed gritstone. It is a long, single-storey building with two cart entrances. Internally, the building is divided by a stone wall, and part is used as a workshop.
Barn at 15 The Royd; 53.47220°N 1.58053°W	—	17th century (probable)	A cruck framed building with walls of coursed gritstone and a later corrugated iron roof. It is of three bays, the right-hand one forming a cowhouse with a hayloft above. The barn has a large cart entrance.
Barn and cowhouse at More Hall; 53.45810°N 1.56134°W	—	17th century	The building is cruck framed and was probably rebuilt in the 18th century, from which time its stonework dates. The barn is of two storeys, and the attached single storey cowhouse has three bays. A later farm building adjoins to the right.
Barn and Cowshed at Edge End Farm; 53.46434°N 1.58151°W	—	17th century (probable)	The building is partly cruck framed, with walls of rubble gritstone. It has a single storey, with a hayloft. It is L-shaped in plan, the barn having three bays, while the projecting cowhouse has two-and-a-half. In the centre of the barn's front wall is a large cart entrance.
Barn at Green Farm; 53.48156°N 1.62061°W	—	17th century	A cruck framed barn, with walls of coursed gritstone rubble. It is of six bays and part of it has an aisle. There is a small additional block at the front left.
Barn at Peas Bloom; 53.46196°N 1.57293°W	—	17th century (probable)	A cruck framed barn with walls of gritstone rubble and a stone slate roof. It is a single-storey building, with a main range including a garage door, and a gabled wing to the right. The wing has a 20th-century extension, and the openings were all altered in that century.
Barn at Windhill Farm; 53.48191°N 1.63091°W	—	17th century (probable)	The ruinous cruck framed barn has walls of rubble gritstone and is roofless. The main section is of three bays, and there is a cowhouse to its left, of which one wall has collapsed.
Berton under Edge Farmhouse; 53.48752°N 1.58972°W	—	17th century	The two-storey building is built of coursed rubble and ashlar. It has three chimneys, two of stone and one of brick. One arched doorway is original, as is one mullioned window. The building has been altered in the late 18th and mid 19th centuries. The roof has an unusual internal structure with a central post.
Royd Farmhouse; 53.47284°N 1.58212°W	—	17th century	The earlier part of the farmhouse is a single two-storey range, two rooms deep, and may originally have been timber-framed. A similar range in stone was added to its right in the 18th century, including a voussoired arched fireplace on the ground floor.
Building adjoining Pot House Farm House; 53.47830°N 1.60058°W	—	Late 17th century	The two-storey gritstone building was originally constructed for the manufacture of glass. In 1740, its staff moved to establish the Catcliffe Glass Manufactory, and the building began being used to make pots. There is a large arch to the rear, and a large blocked arch at the front, with three doors and a pitching hole. Next to the barn are the ruins of a kiln, while there are a later barn and house attached to the building.
More Hall; 53.45797°N 1.56058°W	—	Late 17th century	The house is built of gritstone. Its older wing and its 19th-century wing are both five bays long. The 17th-century section has prominent quoins and mullioned windows.
Windhill Farmhouse; 53.48221°N 1.63059°W	—	Late 17th century	The building originally had two rooms on each of two floors. It is built of coursed gritstone, but was largely rebuilt at an unknown date. A single{ storey entrance range was later added to the rear. Inside, the roof has a king post truss, the timbers believed to be reused from an earlier structure.
Yew Tree Cottage; 53.46394°N 1.59563°W		Late 17th century	The gritstone building is of two storeys and originally had an L-shaped plan. It has large quoins and some mullioned windows. A later addition fills the angle of the range.
Lower Townend Farmhouse, Cottage and Barn; 53.47264°N 1.57129°W	—	1678	The building was originally a two-storey farmhouse, with two rooms on each floor, and an attached three-bay barn. The house has since been split into two dwellings, and altered extensively, although some mullioned windows survive.
Unslivenbridge Farmhouse, Barn and Cowhouse; 53.48870°N 1.61737°W		Late 17th or early 18th century	A laithe house, built of gritstone, of two storeys. Many original openings survive, as do two chimney stacks. The barn and cowhouse are attached, with a large, arched, cart entrance, which has board doors.
Green Farmhouse; 53.48147°N 1.62032°W	—	1711	The building originated as a wing of a Mediaeval farmhouse; the main house was later demolished. Built of gritstone, with a slate roof, most of the openings were altered in the 20th century. There is also a 20th-century flat-roofed extension.
Unsliven Bridge; 53.48858°N 1.61925°W	—	1730	The bridge spans the Little Don River. It lies on an ancient road between High Bradfield and Wakefield. The main part of the bridge is a single arch of gritstone, with a small additional arch immediately to its north. In 1805, the northern approach to the bridge was realigned, and a new wall was attached to the west parapet.
Upper Townend Farm House; 53.47235°N 1.57144°W	—	1745	Built of rough gritstone, it has two storeys and originally had two rooms on each floor, with a central staircase. The building has a more recent extension, and most of the openings date from the 20th century.
Barn and stable at Berton under Edge Farmhouse; 53.48761°N 1.59007°W	—	Mid 18th century	The building is constructed of coursed rubble, with ashlar dressings. The stable has a hayloft above, while the barn has a large double door entrance.
Guide Pillar, Oaks Lane; 53.48527°N 1.62587°W	—	18th century	The pillar lies at a road junction south of Langley Brook. It is made of gritstone, and is about 4 feet 6 inches high. Three faces are inscribed, with "Middop", "Green", and "Unslivenbridge".
Guide Pillar, Machin Lane; 53.48075°N 1.62125°W		18th century	The pillar lies on the south side of the junction with Peg Folly. It is made of gritstone, and is about 6 feet high. Three faces are inscribed, with "Bolsterstone", "Peniston", and "Uden".
Wharncliffe Lodge; 53.45640°N 1.54142°W		18th century	The building, constructed of sandstone, has two storeys and a half-basement. It was remodelled in the 19th century, incorporating elements in the Jacobean style. A weathered inscription dates the building to 1510, but it was largely or wholly demolished and rebuilt in the 18th century.
Briery Busk Farmhouse and Cottages; 53.49112°N 1.60055°W		1786	The gritstone building was built as a pair of houses, but was later divided into six cottages. The structure is built of gritstone and has three storeys and a total of eight bays. The majority of windows are mullioned. A barn, conservatory and garage are attached to the original building.
Barn and farm buildings at Royd Farmhouse; 53.47306°N 1.58206°W	—	1790	The gritstone building is of two storeys and has an L-shaped plan. The barn has a large arched cart entrance, now glazed. A former cowhouse projects from the rear, and there are two later extensions to the rear. The buildings have since been converted into three houses.
Bolsterstone Stocks; 53.46710°N 1.59335°W	—	18th or 19th century	The village stocks have two gritstone posts, one taller than the other. The lower rail is fixed, and the upper one is moveable. It lies within an iron railed enclosure.
Salt Springs Farmhouse; 53.47205°N 1.63017°W	—	Late 18th or early 19th century	A two-storey gritstone building, with mullioned sash windows. There are two tall chimney stacks, and a board door. There are some attached derelict farm buildings of later date.
Cartsheds at Berton under Edge Farmhouse; 53.48728°N 1.58974°W	—	Early 19th century	The single-storey building of coursed rubble was built as a cartshed, then divided into three stables. It has a single window and a stone slate roof. It is used for storage.
Yew Tree Farmhouse; 53.46402°N 1.59555°W		Early 19th century	The two-storey building is built of gritstone and has a stone slate roof. It has a central panelled front door with a wooden porch. The is a later extension to the rear.
Milepost, A616 near Haywood Lane; 53.47965°N 1.57636°W	—	19th century	The milepost is about 200 metres north west of the junction with Haywood Lane. It is made of gritstone, with a cast iron front. On the top it reads "WADSLEY LANGSETT & SHEFFIELD ROAD BOLSTERSTONE", and on the sides are the distances to Huddersfield, Holmfirth and Sheffield.
Milepost, A616 near Park Drive; 53.48374°N 1.59954°W		19th century	The milepost is about 20 metres east of the junction with Park Drive. It is made of gritstone, with a cast iron front. On the top it reads "WADSLEY LANGSETT & SHEFFIELD ROAD GREEN", and on the sides are the distances to Huddersfield, Holmfirth and Sheffield.
Milestone, Manchester Road; 53.49131°N 1.62105°W	—	Late 19th century	The milestone is about 400 metres west of the junction with Underbank Lane. It is made of stone, with a cast iron front. On the top it reads "WADSLEY LANGSETT & SHEFFIELD ROAD", and on the sides are the distances to Hunshelf, Huddersfield and Sheffield.
Church of St Mary; 53.46735°N 1.59355°W		1878	The church, built of gritstone, was designed by J. Fawcett in the Perpendicular style. It has a tower, four-bay nave, and two-bay chancel. Inside, it has a variety of oak furniture.
Bolsterstone War Memorial; 53.46726°N 1.59335°W		1920	The memorial was erected by David Brearley and Sons and is in the form of a Saxon cross, with knotwork designs on the east face. It records the names of 48 casualties of World War I, and five casualties of subsequent conflicts were later added.
K6 telephone kiosk, Main Road; 53.46735°N 1.59306°W	—	Designed 1935	A K6 type telephone kiosk, designed by Giles Gilbert Scott. Constructed in cast iron with a square plan and a dome, it has three unperforated crowns in the top panels.
