= David Wilson (cricketer, born 1917) =

English cricketer

Personal information
- Full name: David Clement Wilson
- Born: 1 March 1917; Eccleston, Cheshire, England
- Died: 19 July 2005 (aged 88); Sheffield, Yorkshire, England
- Batting: Right-handed
- Bowling: Right-arm medium
- Relatives: Clem Wilson (father); Rowland Wilson (uncle); Rockley Wilson (uncle)

Domestic team information
- Years: Team
- 1938–1939: Cambridge University

Career statistics
Competition	First-class
Matches	10
Runs scored	98
Batting average	10.88
100s/50s	–/–
Top score	23*
Balls bowled	1,529
Wickets	15
Bowling average	48.60
5 wickets in innings	1
10 wickets in match	–
Best bowling	5/81
Catches/stumpings	8/–
- Source: Cricinfo, 11 August 2020

David Clement Wilson (1 March 1917 – 19 July 2005) was an English first-class cricketer.

The son of the cricketer Clem Wilson, he was born in March 1917 at Eccleston, Cheshire. He was educated at Winchester College, before going up to Trinity College, Cambridge. While studying at Cambridge, he played first-class cricket for Cambridge University in 1938 and 1939, making nine appearances but did not gain a blue. Playing primarily as a right-arm medium pace bowler, he took 10 wickets at an average of 64.80, with best figures of 4 for 50. As a tailend batsman, he scored 93 runs with a high score of 23 not out. He toured Jamaica in the summer of 1938 with the combined Oxford and Cambridge Universities cricket team, during which he played one first-class match against the Jamaica national team, taking a five wicket haul in the Jamaican first innings with figures of 5 for 81 from 20.3 overs.

The onset of the Second World War delayed the completion his studies at Cambridge, with Wilson serving in the war with the Royal Artillery. He was commissioned as a second lieutenant in November 1940. He saw action in the Far East and was mentioned in dispatches for his service against the Japanese in the 1942–43 Burma campaign. Following the war, he once again mentioned in dispatches for his service in Burma, this time holding the temporary rank of major. In April 1947, he was promoted to captain, with seniority antedated to May 1944. He returned to Cambridge following the war to complete his studies, graduating in 1946, after which he became a solicitor in Sheffield. Wilson died in July 2005. His uncles, Rowland Wilson and Rockley Wilson, also played first-class cricket.
