= Broomhead =

Broomhead is a surname of English origin and was a surname based on the location of the person it was given to. This surname is most commonly found in North Central England.

== History ==
The surname first appears on record in Yorkshire, England in 1290 with the name Henry de Bromeheuede. Surnames were created in England at that time due to the introduction of personal taxes known at that time as Poll Tax. Throughout the centuries, surnames varied in spelling. The surname Broomhead was variously spelt Bromehe(a)d, Bromhead, Bromet, Brumhead, Brummitt and more.

== Present day ==
The surname today is still most prevalent in the UK. Despite that, it is a rare surname and it is estimated that for every million people in the UK, only 27 have the surname Broomhead.

The surname is also found in the following countries,

- USA
- Canada
- France
- Germany
- South Africa
- Australia (see "Notable people" section below).
- New Zealand

== Notable people ==
- David Broomhead (1950–2014), British mathematician
- Malcolm Broomhead (born 1952), Australian businessman
- Tim Broomhead (born 1994), Australian rules footballer
- Mark Broomhead, bassist of Christian metal band Seventh Angel and vocalist/bassist of thrash metal band Detritus.

== Places ==
- Broomhead Hall, South Yorkshire
- Broomhead Reservoir, South Yorkshire
