= John Benaud =

Australian cricketer

Personal information
- Born: 11 May 1944 (age 82)
- Batting: Right-handed
- Bowling: Right-arm medium
- Relatives: Richie Benaud (brother)

International information
- National side: Australia
- Test debut (cap 261): 22 December 1972 v Pakistan
- Last Test: 21 April 1973 v West Indies

Domestic team information
- Years: Team
- 1966/67–1972/73: New South Wales

Career statistics
Competition	Test	First-class
Matches	3	47
Runs scored	223	2,888
Batting average	44.60	36.55
100s/50s	1/-	4/16
Top score	142	142
Balls bowled	24	308
Wickets	2	5
Bowling average	6.00	35.20
5 wickets in innings	0	0
10 wickets in match	0	0
Best bowling	2/12	2/12
Catches/stumpings	0/–	30/–
- Source: ESPNcricinfo, 10 June 2022

John Benaud (born 11 May 1944) is a former Australian cricketer.

Benaud is the son of Louis and Irene Benaud. His only sibling was fellow cricketer Richie Benaud, who was older by 13 years. John is married to Lindsay Benaud with two children. Benaud has lived in the Blue Mountains since 1971.

John began his working career at Fairfax Media's Sydney Sun newspaper as a copy-boy. He was subsequently awarded a journalism cadetship and his career progressed at the paper where he remained for his entire working life. By the time the Sun was closed in 1988 following the disastrous takeover by Warwick Fairfax, Benaud had risen to be the editor-in-chief of the paper. Throughout the 1990s Benaud wrote cricket columns for Australian, British and Indian sports magazines and ghost-wrote several autobiographies. In 1997 he released the book Matters of Choice, the story of his time as an Australian cricket selector.

Benaud played first-class cricket for New South Wales for six years, from 1966/67 to 1972/73, becoming captain of the State side. While Captain of the NSW team, Benaud was famously suspended for a month after refusing to obey the ban on Adidas Grass-sports shoes. The public and media outcry forced Cricket NSW to overturn their decision, and in the off-season the ban was lifted. He represented Australia in the summer of 1971/1972 playing against Gary Sobers' Rest of the World XI. He was selected for three Tests in 1972 to 1973. He made his Test debut in the 1st Test against Pakistan at Adelaide over Christmas 1972, making little contribution as Australia won easily. He also played in the 2nd Test at the MCG over the New Year, which Australia won again. He made the top score of 142 in the second innings, with the knowledge that he had been dropped from the 3rd Test. He returned for his third and final Test appearance in the 5th Test against West Indies at Port of Spain, Trinidad, in April 1973. He contributed little with the bat, but bowled four overs to take 2–12 in a drawn match. He was later a selector for the Australian cricket team.

The 20-year gap between Richie's and John's Test debuts is the second-longest for two brothers, the longest being the English brothers, Clem Wilson and Rockley Wilson, 22 years, between 1899 and 1921.

He wrote the book Matters of Choice: A Test Selector's Story, which was published in 1997. Mark Lawson said it provided "intriguing insights into the mixture of statistical chicanery, personal friendships, regional politics, hunches and finger-crossing that decides the identities of Test elevens in most parts of the world".
