= Midhope =

Midhope may refer to:

- Midhope, collectively, in the Peak district, South Yorkshire, near Sheffield, UK:
  - Midhopestones, a village
  - Upper Midhope, a hamlet
- Midhope Castle, tower house in Scotland
- Mid Hope burn, a stream in Northumberland
