= Broomhead Hall =

Stately home in Sheffield, South Yorkshire, England

Coordinates: 53°27′40″N 1°38′02″W

Broomhead Hall was a large English country house that stood in the Ewden valley, to the west of Sheffield, England. The hall stood near the hamlet of Wigtwizzle, to the west of Broomhead Reservoir.

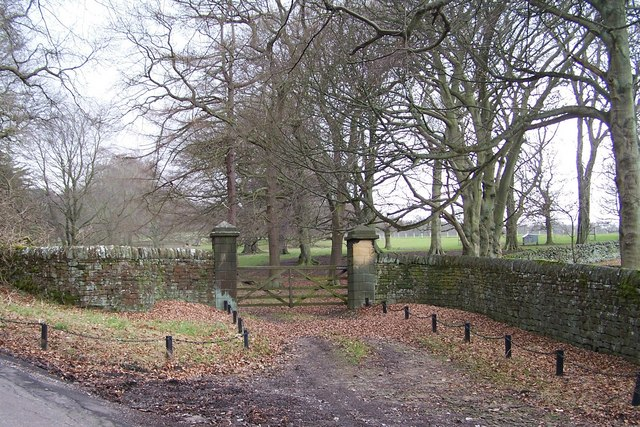
Old Gateway to Broomhead Hall on Allas Lane, Wigtwizzle

== History ==
The original hall was built by Christopher Wilson in the 16th century. Christopher led the opposition when the freeholders of Bradfield rebelled against Gilbert Talbot, 7th Earl of Shrewsbury. The hall was rebuilt by Christopher's son of the same name in the mid 17th century, during the reign of Charles I. Christopher was one of a group of men that received fines due to refusing to show for a knightship. He would later go onto receive a captain's commission in the Parliamentary Army during the English Civil War.

Joseph Hunter, the Sheffield antiquarian wrote about John Wilson of Broomhead Hall, great grandson of Christopher. He noted that John was a keen antiquarian himself, and that he had a room used for storing records and paperwork related to families from Hallamshire and Sheffield itself. Joseph Hunter was given access to this paperwork when producing many of his publications.

The hall passed down through the Wilson family and eventually into the Rimington family. It was demolished in 1980. All that remains is a stable block, a listed building, on Mortimer Road.
