= Canyards Hills =

Protected area in South Yorkshire, England

Coordinates: 53.451358°N 1.622751°W

- Site of Special Scientific Interest
- Location of Canyards Hills.
- Area of search: South Yorkshire
- Grid reference: SK250950
- Interest: Biological and geological
- Area: 64.1 ha (158 acres)
- Notification date: 1990
- Location map: Nature on the map

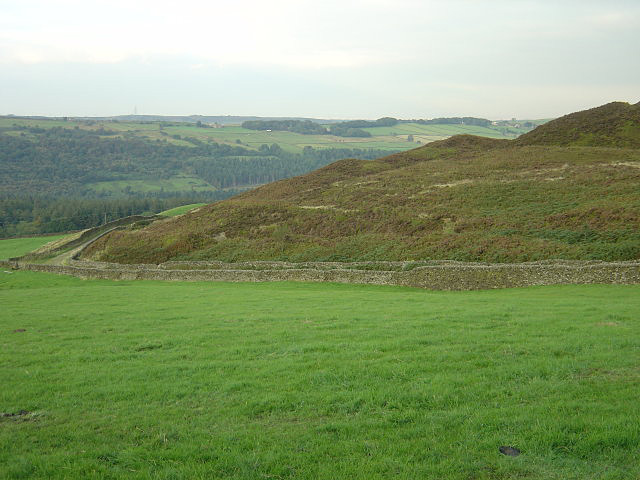
Canyards Hill landslip

Canyards Hills (grid reference SK250950) is a 64.1 hectare (158.4 acre) biological and geological site of Special Scientific Interest in South Yorkshire. The site was notified in 1990. This site possesses the most impressive examples in England and Wales of 'ridge-and-trough' or 'tumbled ground.' Beneath a 10 m high cliff, the north-facing valley side above Broomhead Reservoir and the hamlet of Wigtwizzle is a chaotic mass of sub-parallel ridges, separated by intervening narrow areas of marshy ground. The site is formed in Upper Carboniferous Millstone Grit and shows the most extreme form and best example of 'tumbled ground', with innumerable small Millstone Grit blocks (controlled by jointing) taking up a large landslip.

== See also ==
- List of Sites of Special Scientific Interest in South Yorkshire
