= Brightholmlee =

Hamlet in South Yorkshire, England

Coordinates: 53.452075°N 1.563218°W

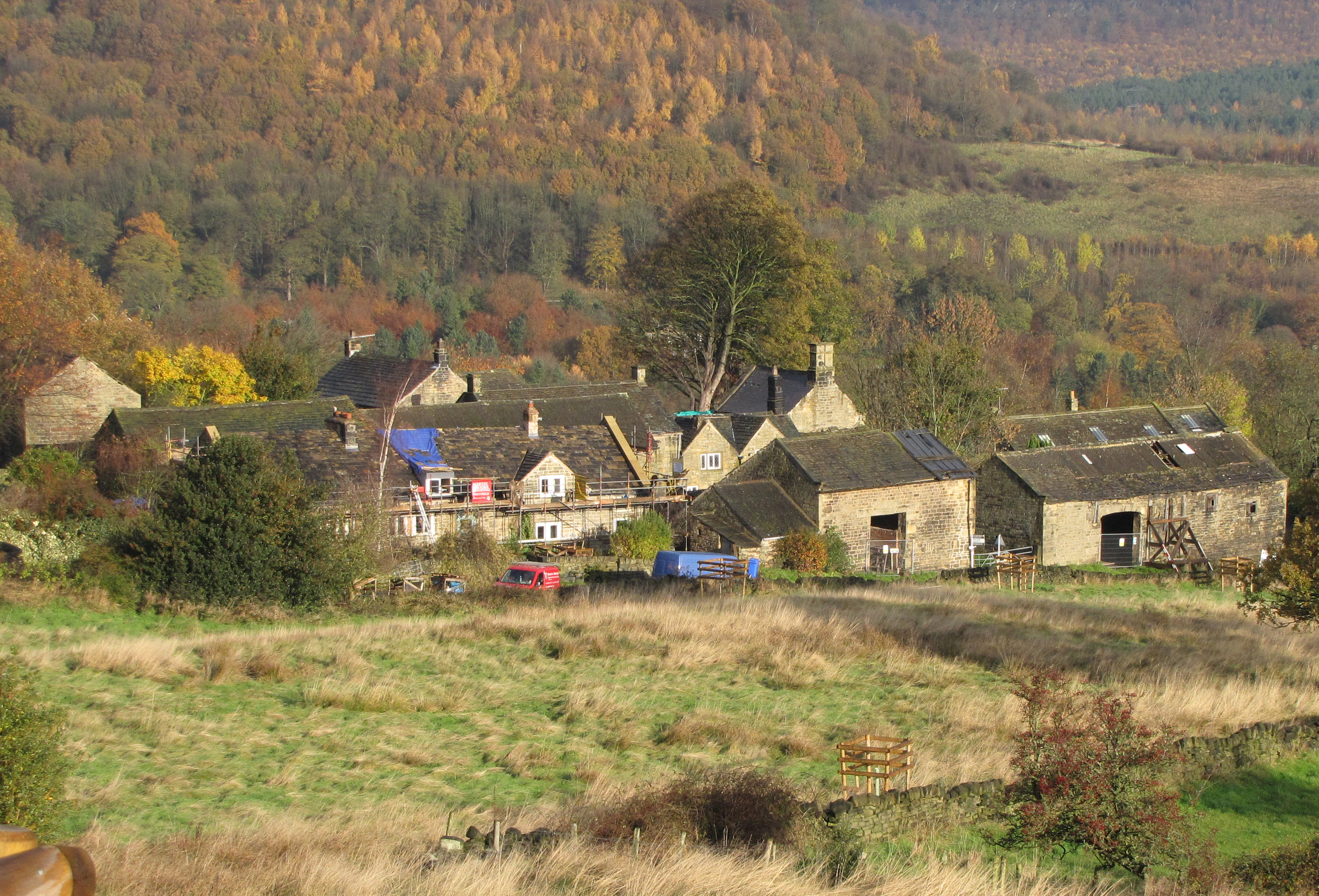
Seen from the south with the Ewden valley behind.

Brightholmlee is a small rural hamlet within the City of Sheffield in England. The hamlet falls within the Stannington Ward of the city. It is 6.2 miles (10 km) north-west of the city centre and 0.6 miles (1 km) west of Wharncliffe Side within Bradfield parish. Previously a farming community, it consists of four farmsteads, Manor Farm, Old Hall Farm, High Lea Farm and Lee Farm. It is now almost entirely residential with the last working farm being sold for development in 2013.

== History ==
The name Brightholmlee originates from the Old English language: Bright is probably a modern derivation of an Anglo Saxon personal name, such as Brihtric or Beorhtweald, holm indicates land surrounded partly by streams, while lee means a woodland glade. The earliest documented reference to the hamlet were in 1309 and 1314 when Ralph de Brightomlee witnessed deeds at Westmondhalgh and Wigtwizzle. Ralph died in 1335 and his son John inherited lands in Westmondhalgh and Onesacre; after 1345 nothing more is heard of this family. Other documents indicate that Brightholmlee originated at the beginning of the 13th century.

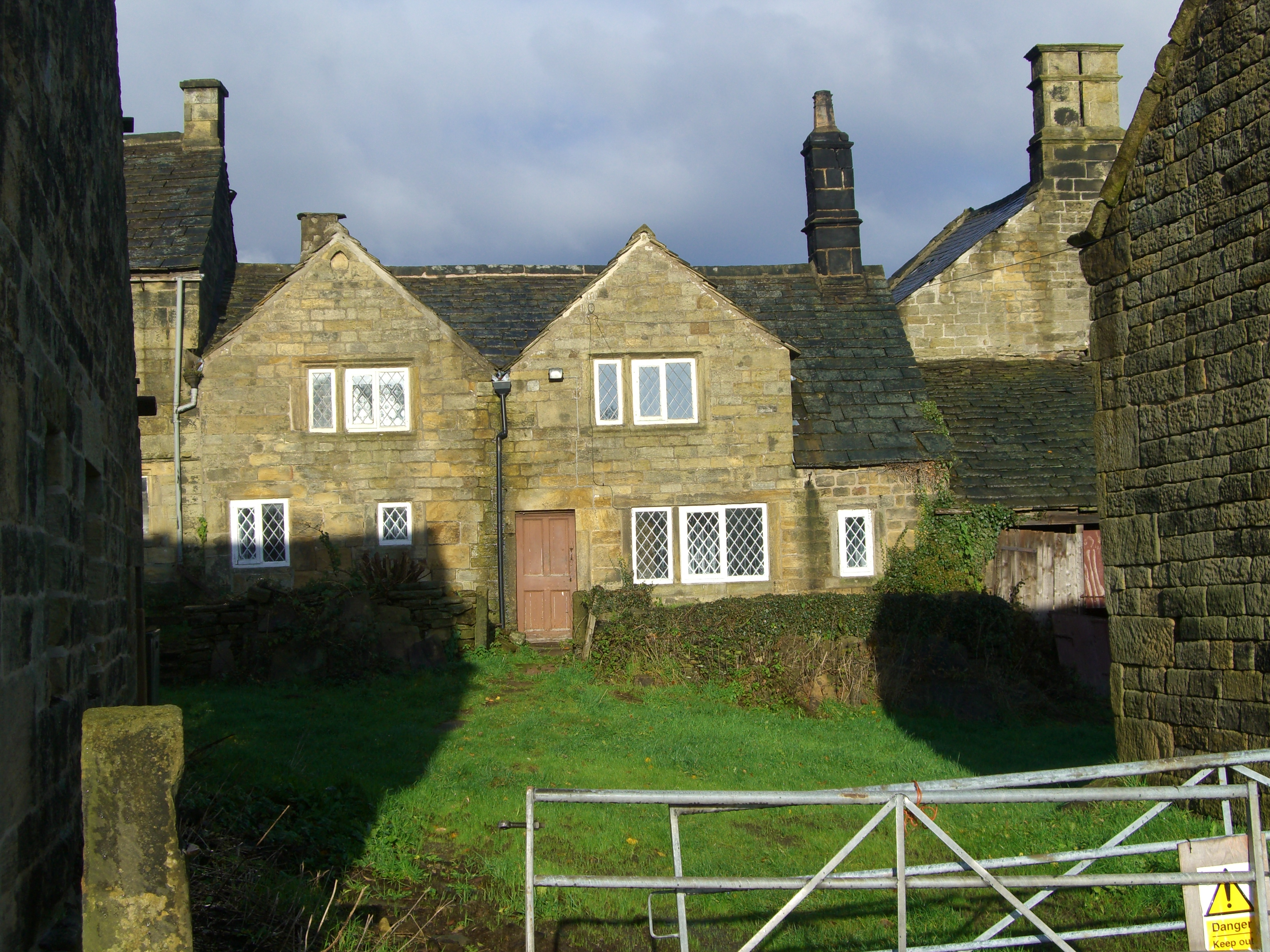
Old Hall Farmhouse is grade II* listed.

The hamlet is split into two by an old packhorse route called Townfield Road which comes up from the south and continues onto Bolsterstone. It is generally accepted that the houses on the uphill side of the track are several hundred years older than those below. The two oldest buildings in the hamlet are High Lea Farm and Old Hall Farm, both of which date from the 17th century, and with the exception of one modern house (Lea Croft) all surviving buildings in the hamlet were shown on the 1851 OS map.

== Buildings and features ==
Old Hall Farm is Grade II* listed. Local historian Joseph Kenworthy believed that Old Hall dated back to the Tudor period because of the design of the fireplace. It is another timber-framed dwelling, with two pairs of crucks. Two wings were later added on either side of the original building; these date from 1620 and 1711 respectively. The farm was the property of the Appleyard family from the 18th century until recent times.

High Lea Farmhouse is a Grade II listed building. It is a long single-storey building with a gabled attic. It is unusual in that it is a rare example of a cruck house, as most cruck buildings are barns. It dates from the 17th century, although the core may be earlier. There were originally three dwellings within the building; this was later reduced to two, with a cottage at the uphill end and a farmhouse at the downhill end. Today one dwelling takes up the whole of the inside.

Several ancient farm-workers' cottages at the junction of Townfield Road and Brightholmlee Lane were demolished in the mid-1970s. The present-day Swinnock Hall, which stands 0.5 km south of the main hamlet, was built on the site of the original building which dated from 1416. The first hall was part of the estate of John Swinnock; later residents included the Waterhouse and Bradshaw families. It is Grade II listed. Manor Farm is another noteworthy building, rated as a Building of Townscape Merit. The name suggests that the building is of medieval origins. Other buildings in the hamlet include Rose Cottage and Lee Farm. The hamlet also has ancient water troughs and a grade II listed milestone inscribed with the Ordnance Survey benchmark and a date of 1860.

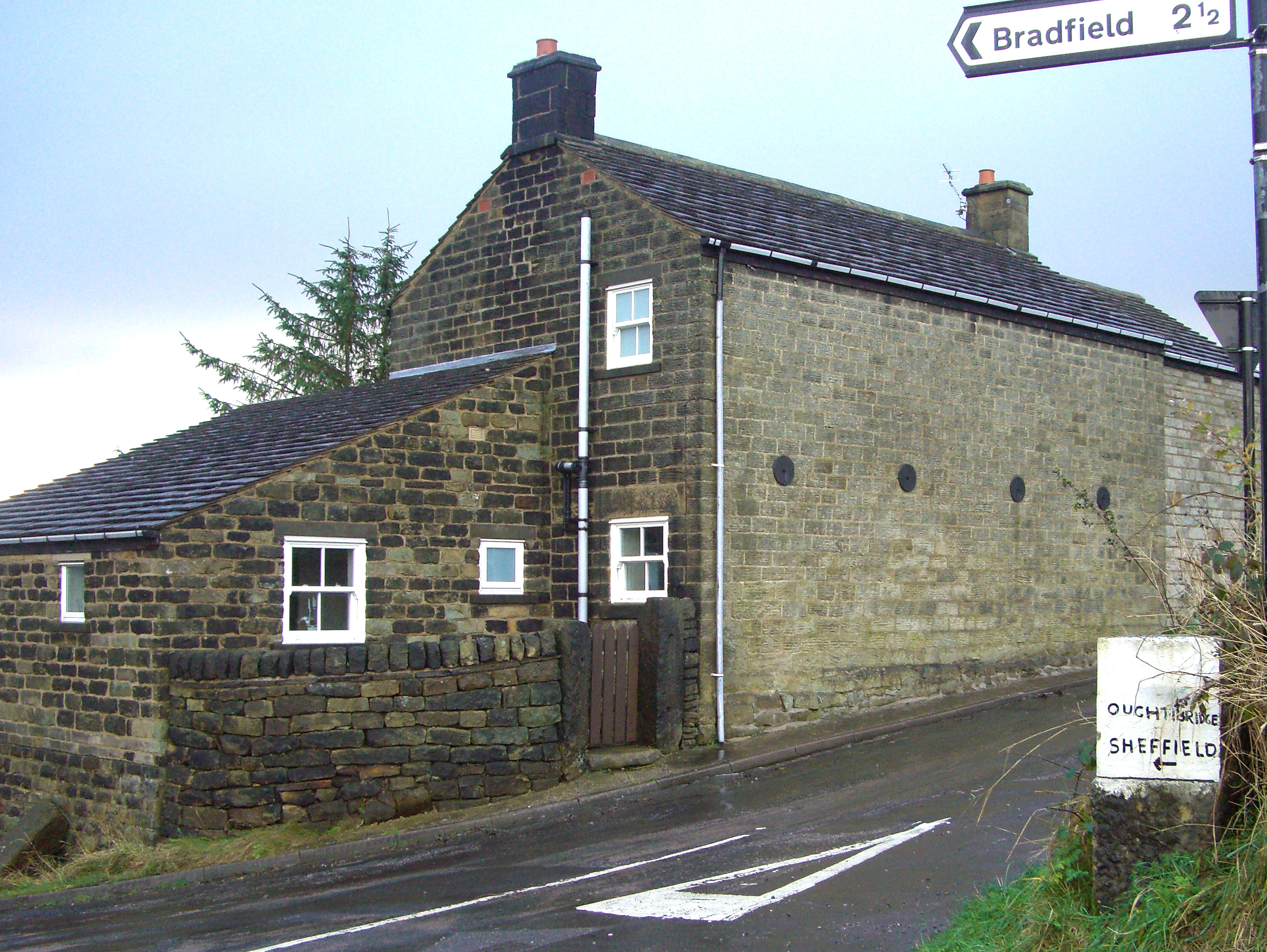
Rose Cottage at the junction of Thorne House Lane and Brightholmlee Road; the 19th-century milepost is bottom right.

== Brightholmlee Conservation Area ==
Brightholmlee was designated as a Conservation Area on 5 January 1977. Outstanding features of the hamlet which contribute to the designation are:

- Exceptional group value as an attractive group of farmhouses, barns, stables and cottages, of which almost all are at least 150 years old and some dating from the 17th century.
- A number of fine traditional buildings that remain in their original form as a reminder of pre-industrial Sheffield.
- Visual continuity with the surrounding area from the use of gritstone rubble as a building material on the barns, walls and field boundaries.
- Wide views in every direction.
- Rural tranquillity.
