= St James' Church, Midhopestones =

Church in South Yorkshire, England

Coordinates: 53.492°N 1.6473°W

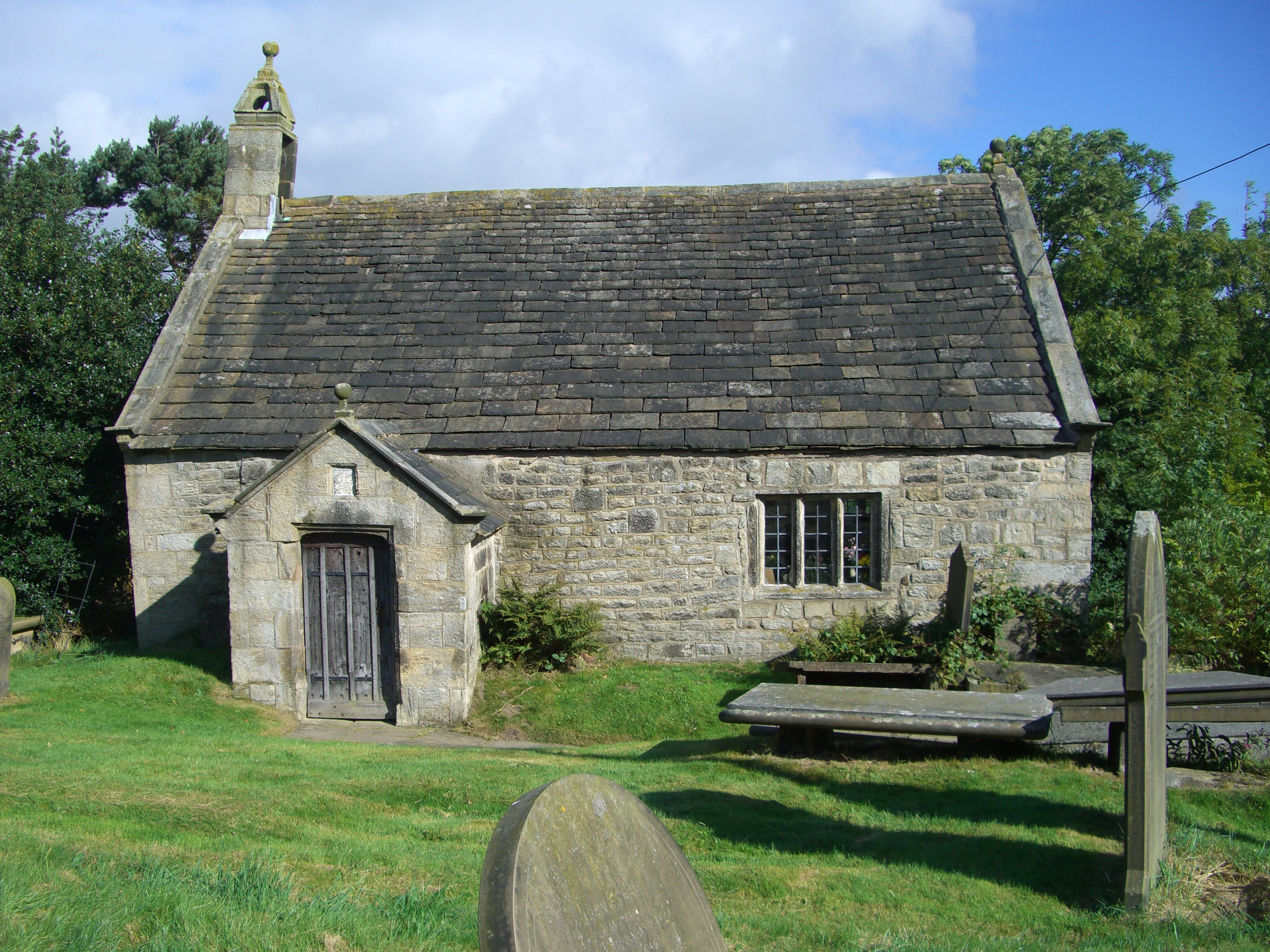

St James’ Church, Midhopestones is situated in the small rural hamlet of Midhopestones, just within the northern boundary of the City of Sheffield in South Yorkshire. Since April 1969 it has been a Grade II* listed building. St James is small church which is often referred to as a chapel, in fact it is situated on Chapel Lane. The church is officially dedicated to James the Less and not James the Greater although there has always been some confusion. Some modern historians and clergy maintain that the church should be dedicated to James the Greater as the scallop shells carved above the church door are the traditional emblem of James the Greater. It is possible that it was re-dedicated to James the Less in the Victorian era because of the smallness of the church. The church is in the Parish of Penistone within the Diocese of Wakefield.

== History ==
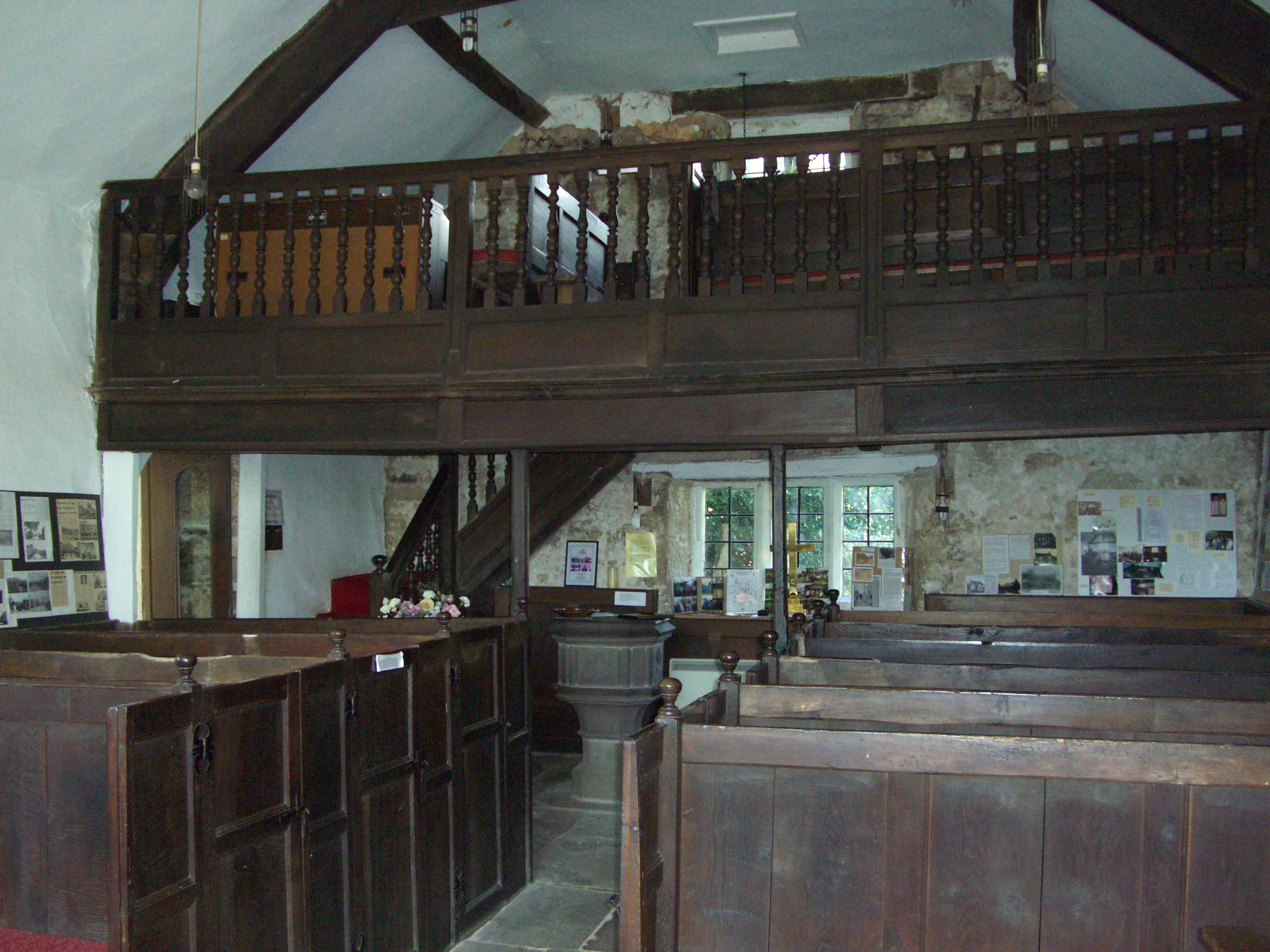
The interior showing the gallery and font

=== Origins ===
St James’ church was founded by the Barnby family of Barnby Hall, Cawthorne. Thomas de Barnby, vicar of Kirkheaton, became Lord of the manor of Midhope in 1337 and was succeeded by his nephew Robert in 1354. Robert de Barnby was the probable founder of the church around the year 1360 although other scholars attribute Thomas de Barnby as the founder at a slightly earlier date. The church was built as a Chapel of ease for the main church of the parish of Ecclesfield, St. Marys’, which lay 14 km to the east. The Barnbys’ used St James’ as their private chapel until 1622 when they were forced to sell the entire manor because of financial hardship brought on by fines levied after the English Reformation for hearing Mass and not attending the state church.

The church was owned by Puritans between 1622 and 1690 and they installed a Jacobean pulpit which was high enough for the preacher to see out of the window. The pulpit is the present day church's most valuable antique. In the second half of the 17th century the chapel fell into disrepair.

=== 1705 restoration ===
The church was restored in 1705 by Godfrey Bosville who became Lord of the manor in 1690. Bosville undertook a partial rebuilding of the east and west ends and added the porch, Minstrels' gallery, box pews and a bell cupola. Bosville had his coat of arms along with his and his wife Bridget's initial carved above the porch door as a sign that he regarded the church as his personal family chapel, a move which upset many local residents.

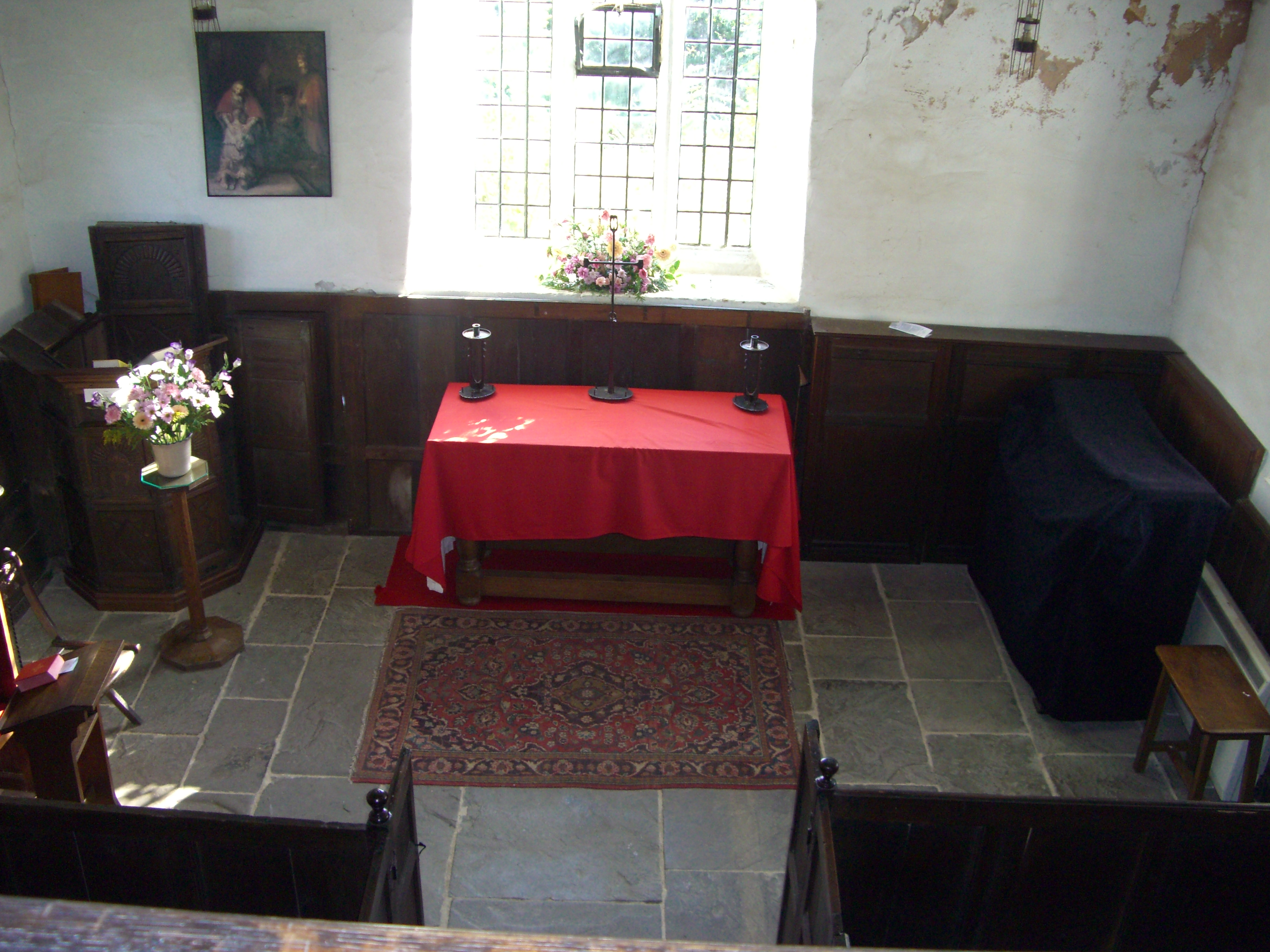
The interior seen from the gallery showing the pulpit and altar.

Until 1847 services at St James’ were performed by clergy from the nearby St Mary's Church, Bolsterstone where all records of births, marriages and deaths were kept. After 1847 services were carried out by clergy from Penistone. The bell in the cupola was replaced in 1858 and again 1929, the graveyard was laid out in the 18th century and further extended in 1915.

=== Modern developments ===
In 1967 a trap door was discovered between the pulpit and the altar by a joiner doing repairs, this led to speculation of an ancient tunnel connecting the church to the old manor house. However no evidence of a tunnel was found and it is now believed that it was a place where the church silver was kept safely in the past. In 1978 renovations took place which included lowering the pulpit to its present height, replacing brass candlesticks and cross with wrought iron ones and the removal of the front box pews and using the oak wood to make inner doors and a desk and chair for the priest. A large ancient stone altar was discovered in the south wall during the 1978 renovations; this is now used as the altar in Saint John the Baptist Church, Penistone.
