= Wigtwizzle =

Hamlet in South Yorkshire, England

Coordinates: 53.461°N 1.635°W

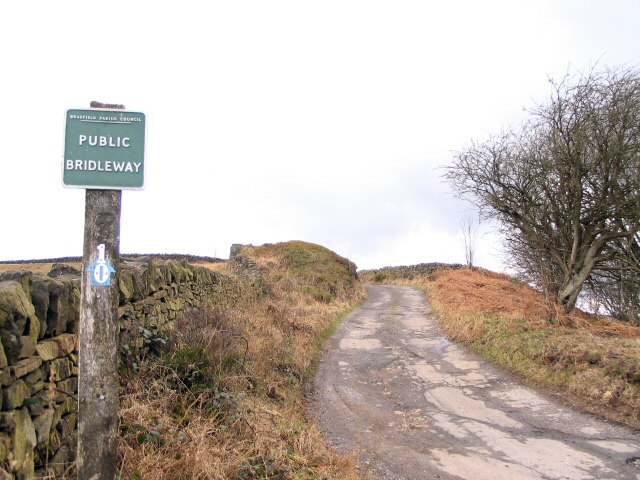
- Road out of Wigtwizzle

- Location within South Yorkshire
- Civil parish: Bradfield
- Shire county: South Yorkshire
- Region: Yorkshire and the Humber
- Country: England
- Sovereign state: United Kingdom
- Post town: SHEFFIELD
- Postcode district: S36
- UK Parliament: Penistone and Stocksbridge

Wigtwizzle is a hamlet in the civil parish of Bradfield, in South Yorkshire, England. The hamlet is 6 miles (9.7 km) south of Penistone, and 12 miles (19 km) north west of Sheffield.

== History ==
In the 15th century, the name of the hamlet was recorded as Wigtwisle, in the 16th century as Wigtwizle, and Wiggtwisle in the 17th century. The name derives from an Anglo-Saxon owner, Wicga, and means Wicga's land at the confluence of two streams, (Allas Lane Dike, and Lee Lane Dike, both of which flow into Broomhead Reservoir). Up until the 1960s, it was still recorded as Wightwizzle, but modern mapping uses Wigtwizzle without the 'H'. (Note: Locally, the name was believed to be Wigtwizzle. This was questioned in 1955 when Sheffield City Council were advertising tours of the "local Lake District" (the various reservoirs to the north west of the city) and Wigtwizzle was listed on the official literature as Wightwizzle.) It is thought that both Wigtwizzle and nearby Brightholmlee, whilst not directly mentioned in the Domesday Book, are parts of one of the sixteen Berewicks of Hallamshire that were mentioned in the book.

The hamlet used to have a large house known as Wigtwizzle Hall. It was believed to have been built in 1610, but was demolished in 1935 and the stone used partly to build the local reservoirs of Broomhead and More Hall. There used to be a pub in the village known as the Sportsman's Arms (or Sportsman Inn), after closure it was used by Sheffield City Council as a woodyard, and has since been converted into a house.

Wigtwizzle was part of the parish of Ecclesfield in the wapentake of Upper Strafforth. It is now part of the civil parish of Bradfield, under which the ten-year censuses are recorded. The land to the west of the hamlet is known as Wightwizzle Common and extended the 3 miles (5 km) to Howden Edge, which is the boundary between Derbyshire and Yorkshire. The road to the west of the hamlet was part of the 2017 Tour de Yorkshire under the name Côte de Wigtwizzle.

To the south of the hamlet is Canyards Hills SSSI.
