= More Hall Reservoir =

Reservoir in South Yorkshire, England

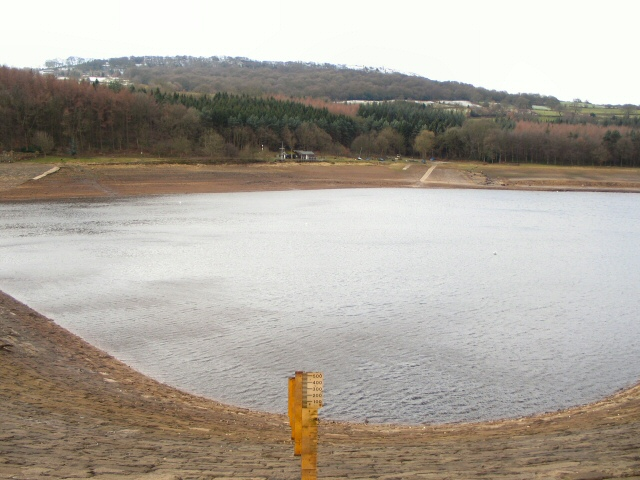
- More Hall Reservoir

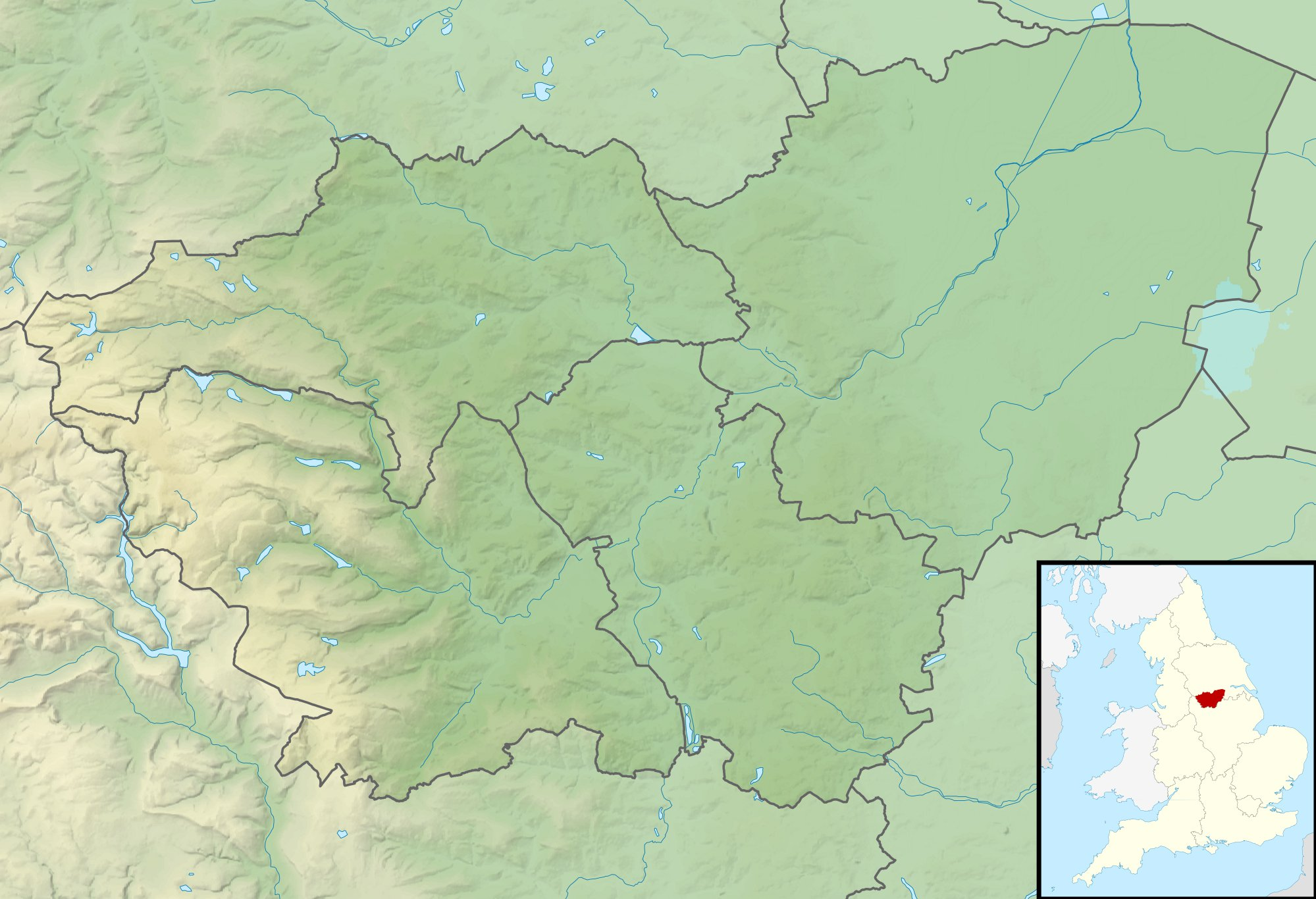
- Location within South Yorkshire Location within England Location within the United Kingdom
- Location: South Yorkshire
- Coordinates: 53°27′33″N 01°34′38″W
- Type: reservoir

More Hall Reservoir is a reservoir located in the Ewden valley near Sheffield, South Yorkshire, England. The reservoir is situated to the south of Bolsterstone and is linked to the Broomhead Reservoir to the west.

Carr House Meadows, a local nature reserve borders the reservoir to the south.
