= Midhope Reservoir =

Reservoir in South Yorkshire, England

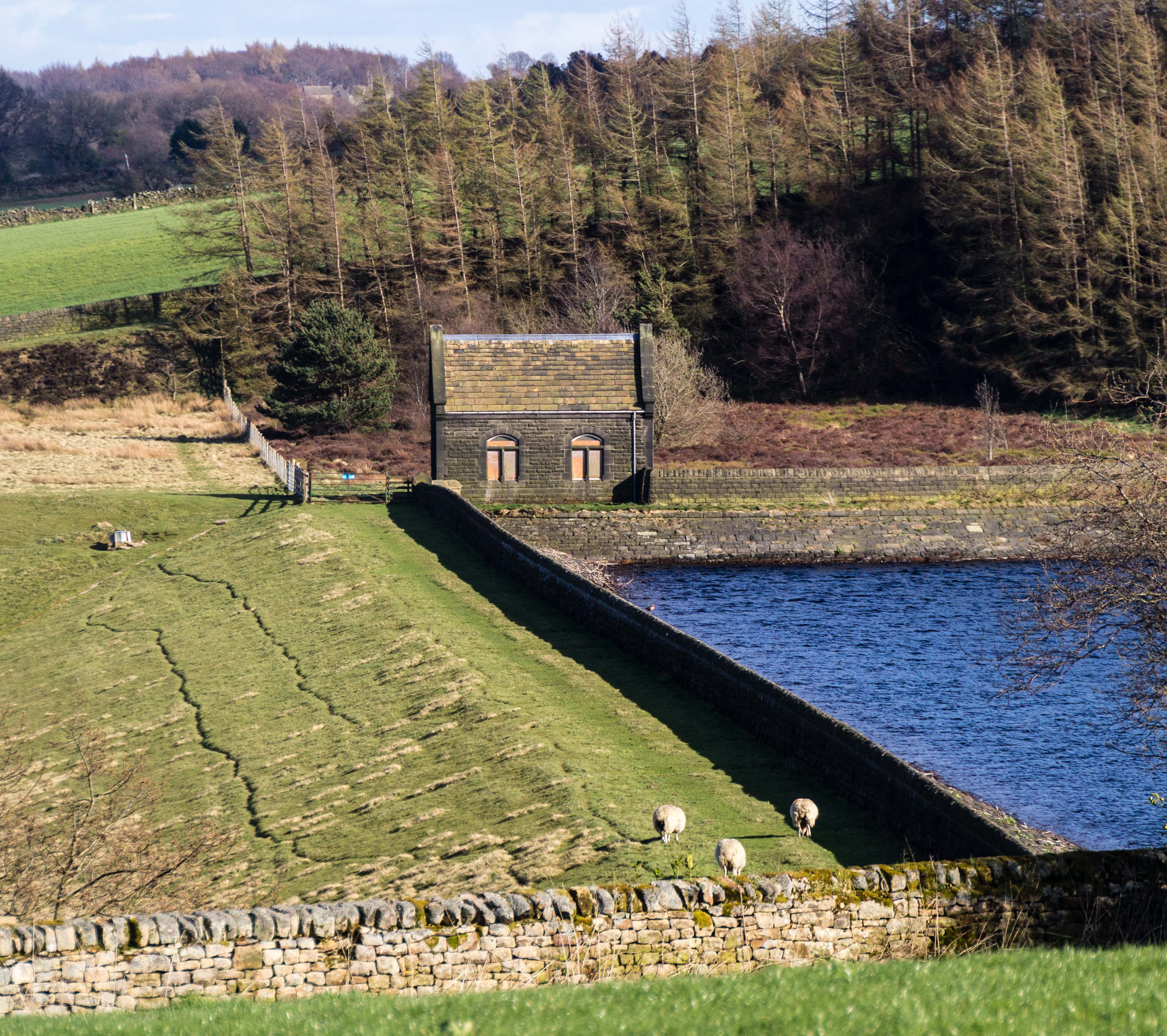
- The dam head at Midhope Reservoir
- Interactive map of Midhope Reservoir
- Location: Upper Midhope, South Yorkshire, England
- Coordinates: 53.491°N 1.666°W
- Type: Reservoir
- Primary inflows: Edge Cliff Brook; Shaw Brook
- Primary outflows: Hagg Brook
- Catchment area: 443 hectares (1,090 acres)
- Managing agency: Yorkshire Water
- Built: 1897
- First flooded: 1903
- Surface area: 20 hectares (49 acres)
- Average depth: 9 metres (30 ft)
- Water volume: 1,765,675 cubic metres (62,354,200 cu ft)
- Surface elevation: 245 metres (804 ft)

Midhope Reservoir is an upland body of fresh water that impounds moorland streams and overflows via Hagg Brook into the Little Don River in South Yorkshire, England. The reservoir was built by the Barnsley Corporation Waterworks, then becoming part of Yorkshire Water in 1973.

== History ==
The reservoir covers an area of 20 hectares (49 acres) with an average depth of 9 metres (30 ft) and typically stores 1,765,675 cubic metres (62,354,200 cu ft) of water. It has a catchment area of 443 hectares (1,090 acres), lies at a height of 245 metres (804 ft) above sea level, and when is at water capacity level, covers 206,000 square metres (2,220,000 sq ft). The catchment area consists largely of forested land overlain on millstone grit and coal measures. When the water levels are low, the east bank of the reservoir reveals a strata of rock including sandstone, grey shale, blue shale, clay with iron nodules and black shale.

Plans were lodged with Westminster for Parliamentary approval in late 1894 with the scheme estimated to cost £170,000 (equivalent to £19,104,000 in 2025) and the reservoir was entitled as Hagg Brook, (Note: The text in the London Gazette reads as follows: "A reservoir (to be called the Hagg Brook Reservoir) to be situate [sic] wholly in the township of Bradfield, in the Parish of Ecclesfield, and to be formed by the means of an embankment across the valley of the Hagg Brook at a distance of 14 chains, or thereabouts, measured in a south-south-westerly direction from the bridge known as Hagg Bridge......" The same document indicates that another reservoir, named as Midhope Reservoir, was to be built downstream of Midhopestones between Midhopestones Corn Mill and Unsliven Bridge. This site is now Underbank reservoir.) the stream that it was to be built across. This was met with opposition from a number of landowners, and the corporations of Doncaster, Rotherham and Sheffield. The bill was held up in the House of Lords, and then a General Election in 1895 delayed its passing through Parliament. The bill was approved in 1896 as Barnsley Corporation (Water) Act 1896 (59 & 60 Vict. c. lii). An agreement was reached with the Sheffield Corporation regarding the building of their Langsett Reservoir; the Barnsley Corporation would allow a flow of water to enter the River Don system in order to compensate any loss of water during the building works if Midhope Reservoir was completed first. In October 1896, boreholes were drilled in the area of the dam.

Work on the site began in 1897 after an official sod-cutting ceremony. The valves of the reservoir were opened by the Lord Mayor of Barnsley on 25 June 1903, acting as a grand opening ceremony, however, work on the site continued, and it wasn't until March 1905 that the final clearance sale of locomotives, static engines, steam cranes and other items were listed in a final sale. The final cost of the works at 1905 was £300,000 (equivalent to £31,538,000 in 2025).

The embankment across Hagg Brook is a puddle-clay core which is 320 metres (1,050 ft) long, 7.9 metres (26 ft) thick, and 44 metres (145 ft) deep from the top of the embankment down to greatest depth of the trench, which was sunk to 15 metres (50 ft) below the surface. A house was built in 1912 for the reservoir manager, which included a tower so the manager could look down and view activity on the site. This was last used for its intended purpose in the 1950s, and after some time as a place for Yorkshire Water employees to stay, the house was sold off to a private owner in 2010.

The reservoir was built to accommodate the supply from Hagg Brook, Edgecliff Brook, Shaw Brook and Knall Brook. Originally, it had also been intended to supply the reservoir from Thickwoods Brook, but after some "considerable litigation", Thickwoods Brook was given over to supply the Sheffield Corporation's Langsett Reservoir, so Midhope was then designed to be slightly smaller in capacity than originally intended.

The westernmost portion of the reservoir is within the Peak District National Park. The reservoir is designated as an upland reservoir which is now part of Yorkshire Water's holdings, and supplies water directly for treatment, and also provides water to Underbank Reservoir which acts as a compensation reservoir.

== See also ==
- List of reservoirs in the Peak District
