= Rowland Wilson (cricketer) =

English clergyman and sportsman

Personal information
- Full name: Rowland Alwyn Wilson
- Born: 18 July 1868; Bolsterstone, Yorkshire, England
- Died: 1 October 1959 (aged 91); Hartlebury, Worcestershire, England
- Batting: Right-handed
- Bowling: Right-arm fast-medium
- Relatives: Clem Wilson (brother); Rockley Wilson (brother)

Domestic team information
- Years: Team
- 1888–1889: Cambridge University
- 1896: Worcestershire

Career statistics
Competition	First-class
Matches	3
Runs scored	18
Batting average	6.00
100s/50s	–/–
Top score	15
Balls bowled	181
Wickets	1
Bowling average	48.00
5 wickets in innings	–
10 wickets in match	–
Best bowling	1/13
Catches/stumpings	3/–
- Source: Cricinfo, 19 June 2022

Rowland Alwyn Wilson (18 July 1868 – 1 October 1959) was an English clergyman and a sportsman who represented Cambridge University both in track athletics and in first-class cricket. He was born at Bolsterstone, Yorkshire and died at Hartlebury, Worcestershire. He was the brother of two England Test cricketers: Clem Wilson and Rockley Wilson.

Wilson was educated at Rugby School and at Trinity College, Cambridge. He was in the cricket team at Rugby as a lower-order right-handed batsman and right-arm fast-medium bowler. In his three first-class matches at Cambridge University, he was relegated to the tail-end as a batsman and, although economical as a bowler, took only a single wicket. He was not selected for the University Match against Oxford University. He was, however, awarded a Blue for athletics, representing the university in the mile race.

Wilson graduated from Cambridge University with a Bachelor of Arts degree in 1890, and this converted to a Master of Arts in 1894. He was ordained as a deacon in the Church of England in 1894 and as a priest the following year, and then served as curate at Hartlebury from 1894 to 1900, as vicar of Hints, Staffordshire, from 1900 to 1910, and as rector of Great Witley with Little Witley and Hillhampton, in Worcestershire, from 1910 to his retirement in 1945. From 1928, he served also as an honorary canon of Worcester.
