= Clem Wilson =

English cricketer and clergyman

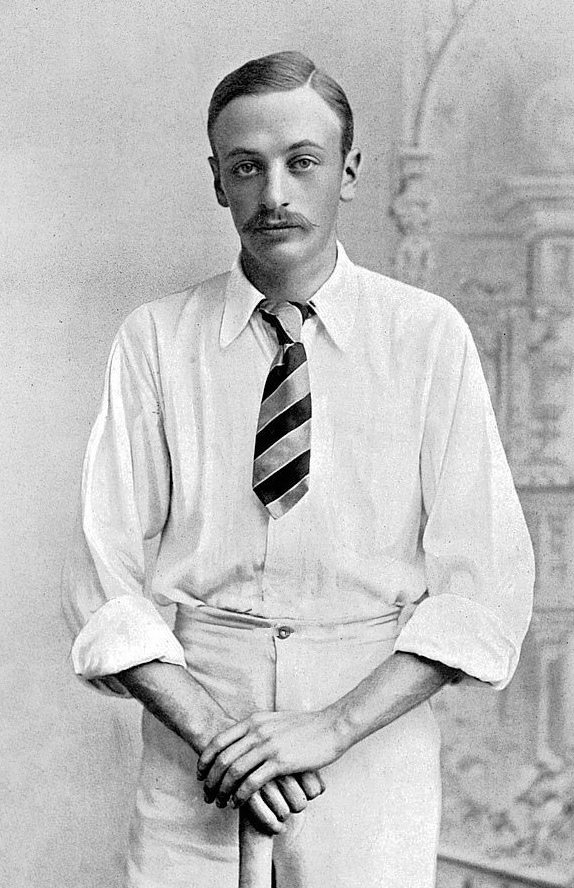
- Wildon in about 1895

Personal information
- Full name: Clement Eustace Macro Wilson
- Born: 15 May 1875; Bolsterstone, Stocksbridge, Yorkshire, England
- Died: 8 February 1944 (aged 68); Calverhall, Shropshire, England
- Batting: Right-handed
- Bowling: Slow left-arm orthodox Right-arm fast-medium

International information
- National side: England
- Test debut: 14 February 1899 v South Africa
- Last Test: 1 April 1899 v South Africa

Career statistics
Competition	Test	First-class
Matches	2	52
Runs scored	42	1,665
Batting average	14.00	23.78
100s/50s	0/0	1/10
Top score	18	115
Balls bowled	–	5,829
Wickets	–	125
Bowling average	–	18.69
5 wickets in innings	–	6
10 wickets in match	–	2
Best bowling	–	18.69
Catches/stumpings	0/–	34/–
- Source: ESPNcricinfo, 23 July 2018

The Reverend Clement Eustace Macro Wilson (15 May 1875 – 8 February 1944) was an English amateur first-class cricketer and Church of England clergyman.

== Cricket career ==
Wilson played first-class cricket for Cambridge University between 1895 and 1898, being university Blue captain in latter year, and for Yorkshire between 1896 and 1899. He also played two Test matches for England, when they toured South Africa in 1898–99.

== Background and education ==
Wilson was born in Bolsterstone, Stocksbridge, Yorkshire, England, and educated at Uppingham School and Trinity College, Cambridge, where he graduated BA in 1899, and MA in 1903.

== Clergy career ==
Wilson was ordained deacon in 1899, and priest in 1903. He was curate at Whitby, North Yorkshire, 1901–03; Dunchurch, Warwickshire, 1903–04, and neighbouring Rugby from 1904 to 1909.

From 1910 to 1912 he was, for his first time, Vicar of Calverhall, Shropshire, then from 1912 to 1921 Rector of Eccleston, Cheshire where he was also estate chaplain and librarian to the Duke of Westminster at Eaton Hall, and from 1921 to 1925 Vicar of Sand Hutton, North Yorkshire.

He returned to Calverhall again as its Vicar in 1925, holding the living, with that of neighbouring Ightfield from 1928, until his death. He was later also Prebendary of Lichfield Cathedral, in whose diocese the parishes lie.

Rockley Wilson, his brother, also played for Yorkshire and England and an older brother, Rowland, played fleetingly for Cambridge University. His son, David, also played first-class cricket.
