= Stocksbridge and Upper Don =

Electoral ward in the City of Sheffield, South Yorkshire, England

- Shown within Sheffield
- Population: 18,541 (2011)
- Metropolitan borough: City of Sheffield
- Metropolitan county: South Yorkshire
- Region: Yorkshire and the Humber
- Country: England
- Sovereign state: United Kingdom
- UK Parliament: Penistone and Stocksbridge
- Councillors: Mark Whittaker (Labour Party); John Booker (Reform UK); Janet Ridler (Labour Party)

Stocksbridge and Upper Don ward is one of the 28 electoral wards of the borough of Sheffield, South Yorkshire, England. The population of this ward was 18,541 at the 2011 Census.

The main population centres in the ward are Stocksbridge and Oughtibridge; the ward also includes the villages of Deepcar, Wharncliffe Side, Bolsterstone, Midhopestones, Upper Midhope and Ewden Village.

== Description ==
The population of this ward in 2011 was 18,541 people in 8,099 households. It is located in the northwestern part of the borough of Sheffield, outside the city and covers an area of 67.4 km^{2} (26.0 sq mi), a little more than one sixth of the area of the city.

Up to the 2010 general election Stocksbridge and Upper Don was one of the wards that made up the Sheffield Hillsborough constituency; at the 2010 election the ward became part of the Stocksbridge and Penistone constituency.

=== Places in Stocksbridge and Upper Don ward ===
Stocksbridge is a town in the metropolitan borough of the City of Sheffield. In 2007 the population of the town including Deepcar and Bolsterstone was nearly 14,000. Deepcar is a village adjoining the eastern end of Stocksbridge.

To the south of Stocksbridge are the villages of Bolsterstone, site of a manor house; and further south is Ewden Village, a navvy village established in the early 20th century during the construction of the Sheffield reservoirs.

Oughtibridge is a village to the south east of Stocksbridge, on the main road to Sheffield, in the Upper Don Valley. The village of Wharncliffe Side is located on the main road between Deepcar on Oughtibridge.

Midhopestones (or Nether Midhope), and Upper Midhope (or Over Midhope) are small villages in the western half of the ward, close to the northern border, and near to Midhope reservoir and Langsett reservoirs.

== Locations ==
- Stocksbridge 53.478868°N 1.601808°W (grid reference SK275980)
- Deepcar 53.474043°N 1.569773°W (grid reference SK289975)
- Oughtibridge 53.436°N 1.539°W
- Wharncliffe Side 53.449578°N 1.553512°W (grid reference SK297948)
- Bolsterstone 53.466598°N 1.594155°W
- Ewden village 53.46065°N 1.591094°W
- Midhopestones 53.491355°N 1.650237°W
- Upper Midhope 53.494159°N 1.675012°W
