= Bolsterstone =

Village in South Yorkshire, England

Coordinates: 53.467°N 1.594°W

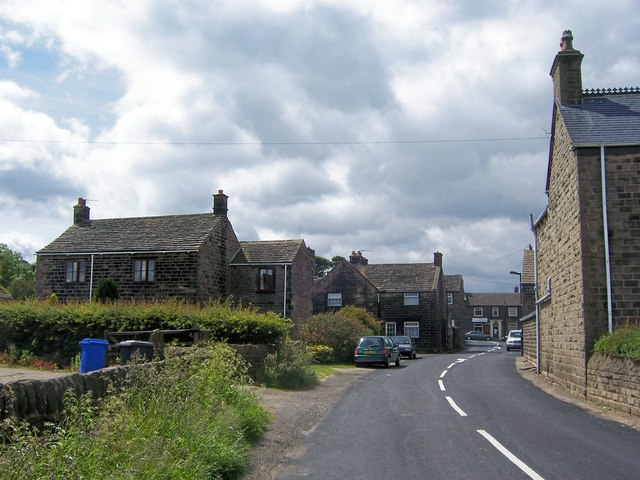

- Location within South Yorkshire
- Metropolitan borough: Sheffield
- Metropolitan county: South Yorkshire
- Region: Yorkshire and the Humber
- Country: England
- Sovereign state: United Kingdom
- Post town: SHEFFIELD
- Postcode district: S36
- Dialling code: 0114
- Police: South Yorkshire
- Fire: South Yorkshire
- Ambulance: Yorkshire
- UK Parliament: Penistone and Stocksbridge

Bolsterstone is a village in South Yorkshire, England, south of Stocksbridge, and 8.5 miles to the northwest of the City of Sheffield and within the city borough. Part of the village lies within the border of the Peak District national park. Bolsterstone had a population of 386 in 2011.

== Geography and history ==
Bolsterstone is less than 1 km south of the town of Stocksbridge within the civil parish of Stocksbridge, and the electoral ward of Stocksbridge and Upper Don. The village is at a height of around 300 m (980 ft) above sea level on the northern side of the east–west Ewden valley, north of Broomhead and More Hall reservoirs.

The origin of the name "Bolsterstone" is unknown; it may be a corruption of the root word "Walder" (also used in local place names, including a barrow), or may refer to two large stones in the village, which are referred to as the "Bolster Stones". The village is thought to have been established in the Anglo-Saxon period. St Mary's Church was founded in 1412, and a fortified manor house ("Bolsterstone Castle") is thought to have been built by an Earl of Shrewsbury. Two buildings dating from the 16th or 17th century are thought to be remnants of the castle: Castle Cottages are mostly 19th-century with parts of walls dating from the earlier period; Porters Lodge, also mostly 19th-century, is thought to contain elements of the castle gatehouse.

A Free School was built in the village in 1686 (rebuilt 1780). Land around the village was enclosed after 1778, and St. Mary's church was rebuilt in the 1790s. In 1802 the entire manor of Bolsterstone, over 3,460 acres (14.0 km^{2}) was put up for sale, and acquired by James Rimington.

The Castle Inn was built in 1840; Bolsterstone National School in 1851/2 and the Free School rebuilt in 1857; and a vicarage built in 1862; between 1872 and 1879 St Mary's church was again rebuilt.

As of 2009 the village functions as a residential village; the village has no shops, and both schools have closed; the National School building is used as a village hall.

The Peak District Boundary Walk runs through the village.

== People ==
Three first-class cricketers were born in Bolsterstone: the brothers Clem, Rowland and Rockley Wilson.

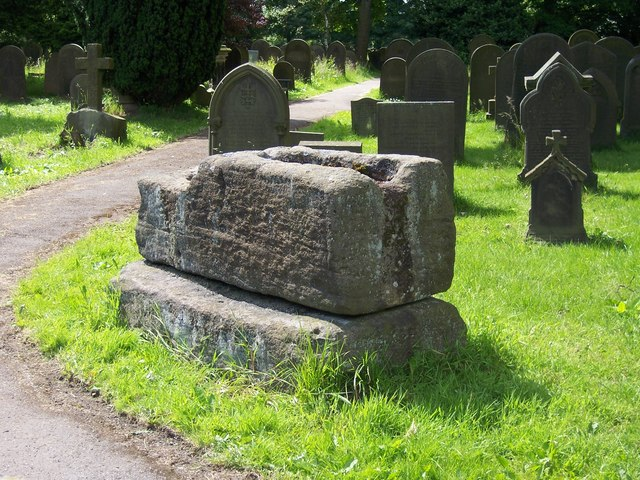
The Bolster Stones that now stand in St. Mary's Churchyard, after being relocated from Unsliven Bridge in Stocksbridge, widely believed to give the village its name

== See also ==
- Listed buildings in Stocksbridge
