= St Mary's Church, Bolsterstone =

Church in Sheffield, South Yorkshire, England

Coordinates: 53.4674°N 1.5936°W

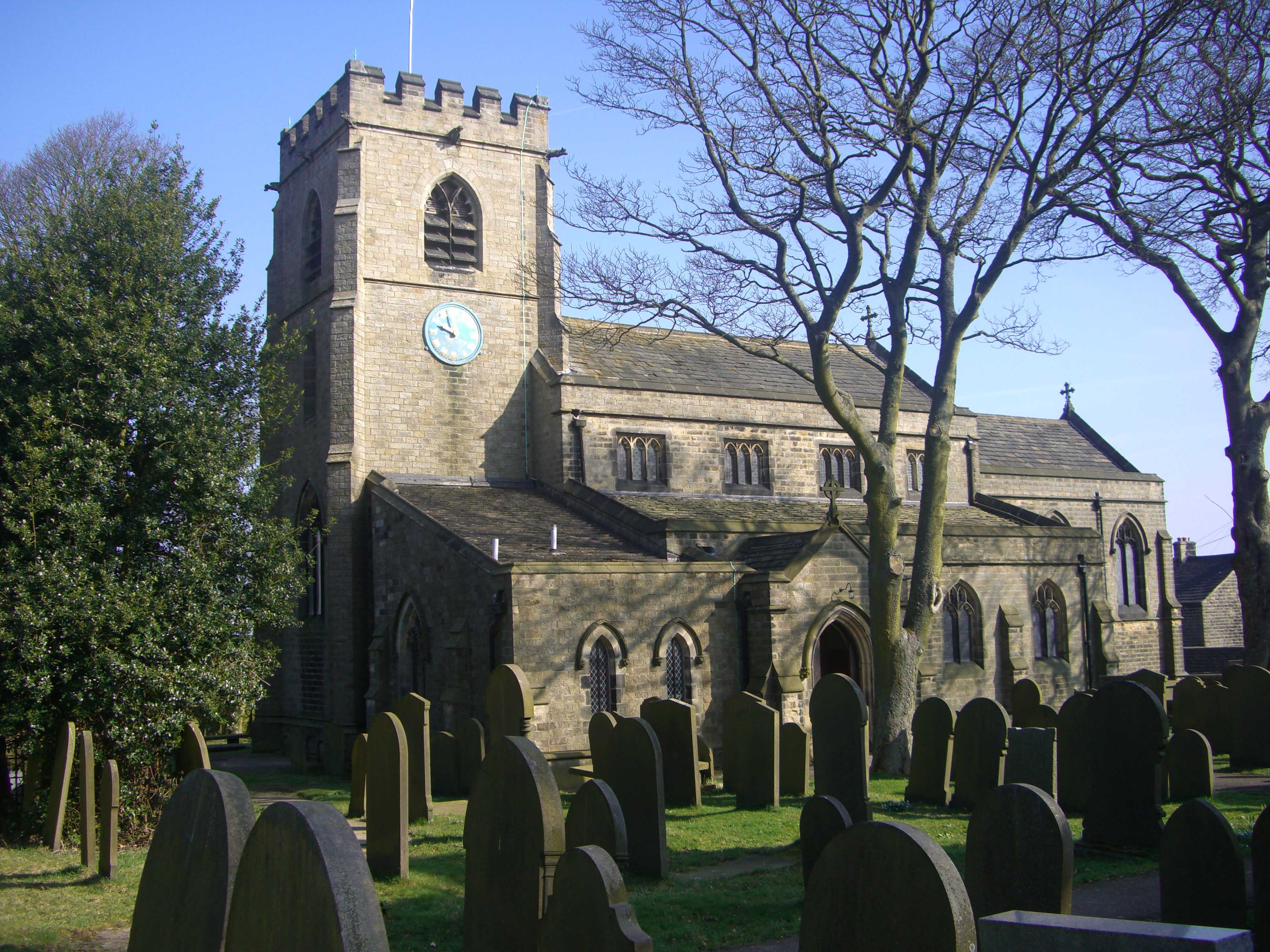
The church

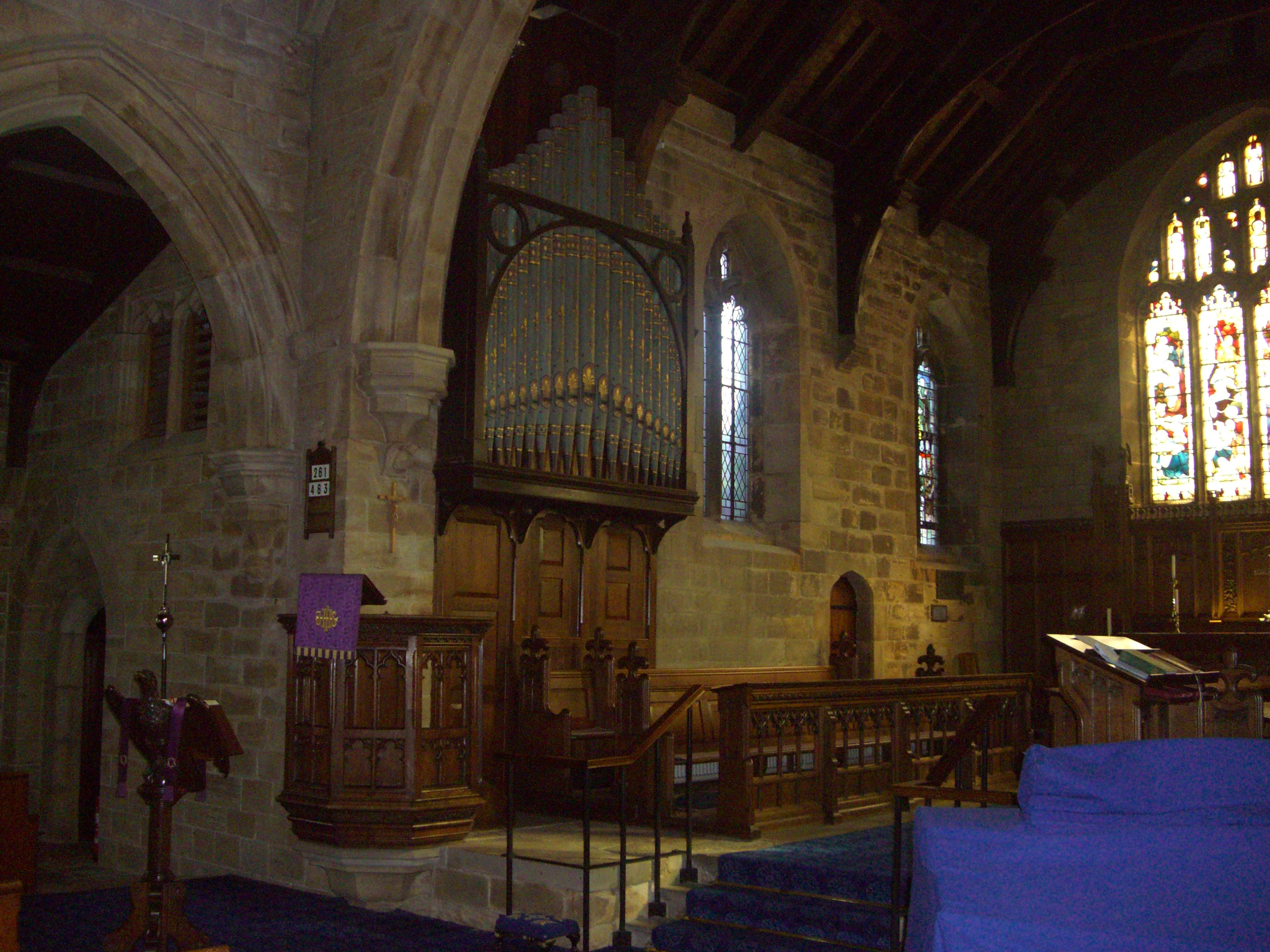
The interior

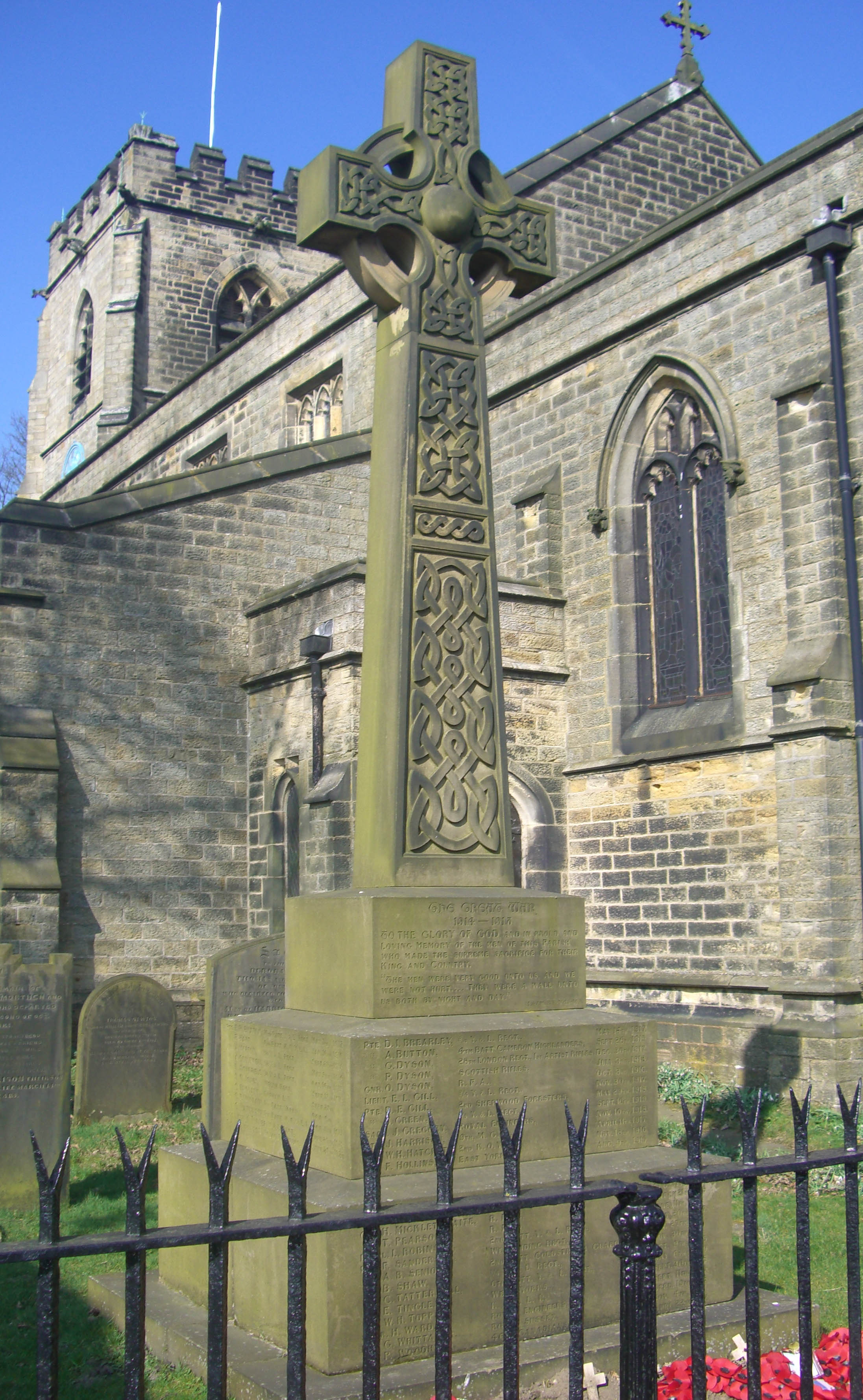
War Memorial

St Mary's Church, Bolsterstone is situated in the village of Bolsterstone, within the boundary of the City of Sheffield in South Yorkshire, England. The church dates from 1879 although there is evidence that a place of worship has existed on the site since the 12th century. It is located 8.1 miles (13 km) north-west of the city centre and is a grade II listed building.

== History ==
There are unsubstantiated claims that a chapel existed in the village of Bolsterstone in the 12th century. However the first documented place of worship on the site of St Mary's was established by Sir Robert de Rockley in 1412. This took the form of a private chantry with Richard of Westhall as the first incumbent. At that time Bolsterstone was within the large parish of Ecclesfield and the chantry soon turned into a public chapel as it became a popular place of worship for the local population because of the large distance to travel to the parish church of St Mary's, Ecclesfield or its sister church St Nicholas, Bradfield. From its early days the chapel was also used as a day school for local children, this practice stopped in 1686 because the building was deemed unsuitable and a new free day school was built nearby.

Throughout the 18th century, the chapel was extended with the addition of a gallery, roof loft and a peal of bells. However, by the later part of the 18th century it had fallen into disrepair and was deemed unsafe, with the congregation unable to assemble “for the public worship of Almighty God without manifest danger to their lives”. Reverend Thomas Bland replaced the chapel with a new church in 1791. The new building was unpopular from an architectural point of view with the local historian Gatty saying it was “more like a factory than a church”, other sources call it “plain but substantial”. It was consecrated in 1796 and had sash windows and spacious galleries. A vicarage was added in 1862, in 1870 Bolsterstone became a parish in its own right and included nearby Stocksbridge and Deepcar. Bland's church remained unpopular and lasted barely 80 years before the vicar William Reginald Wilson decided to replace it in 1872. Wilson was vicar between 1867 and 1914, a tenure of 47 years, making him the longest serving incumbent in the church's history.

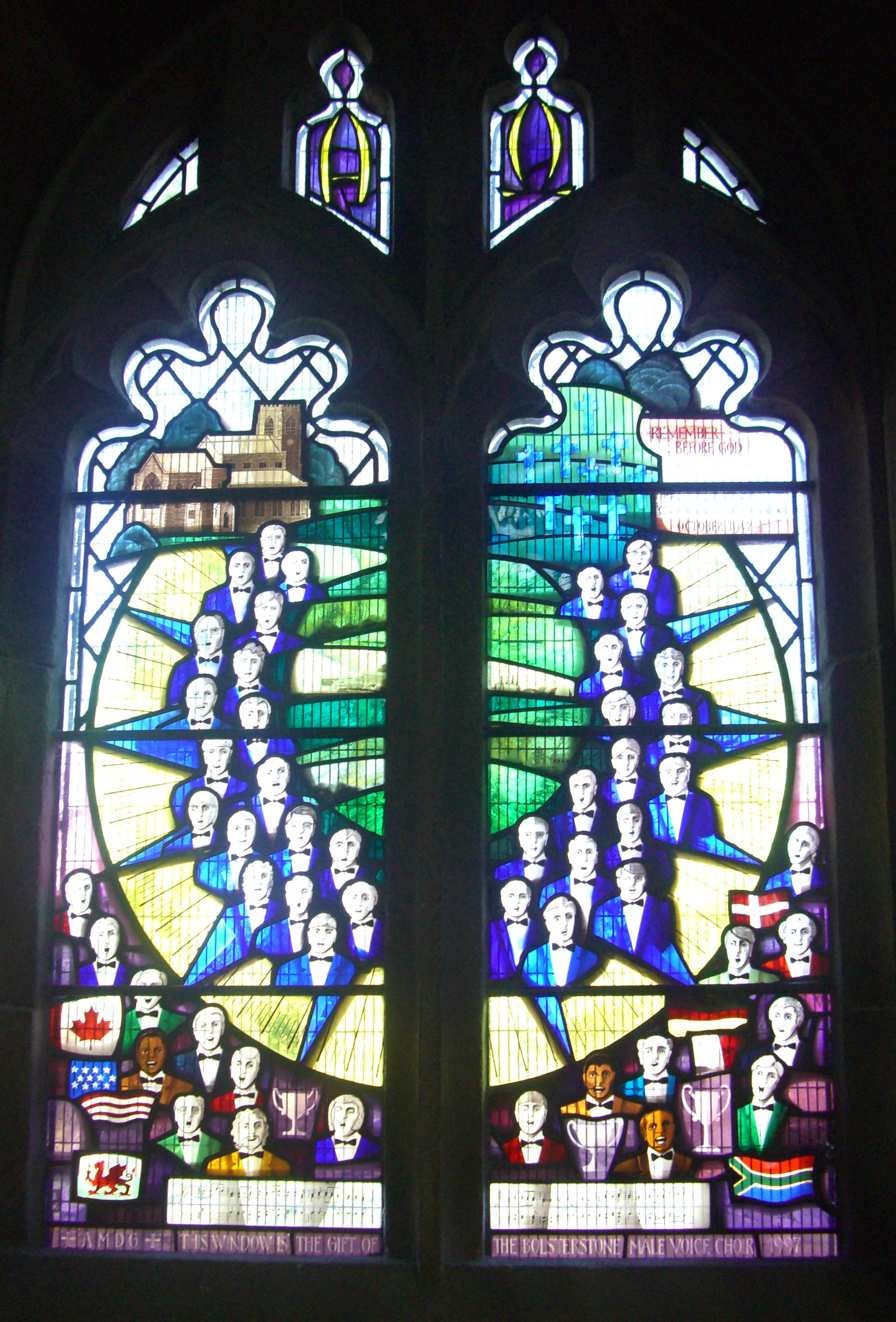
The memorial window to the members of the Bolsterstone Male Voice Choir party killed in 1947.

The new church was built in stages between 1872 and 1879. The foundation stone was laid in August 1878 by the lord of the manor Rimington Wilson and the construction was completed in May 1879 by local builder John Brearley at a total cost of £7,200. The stained glass windows for the east and south walls were a gift from Rimington Wilson. The church was opened in June 1880 by William Thomson, Archbishop of York. A series of important changes were made to the church before the turn of the 20th century, a new organ was installed in July 1885, a new peal of eight bells was fitted in 1892 from the bellmakers John Taylor of Loughborough and in June 1897 a lychgate was erected to mark the diamond jubilee of Queen Victoria. The graveyard contains two large rectangular stones of unknown origin; these are known as the Bolster Stones.

In 1921 a war memorial was erected by the side of the lychgate; it takes the form of a Celtic cross and records the names of 48 people of the parish who were killed in conflicts in the 20th century. In the early 1950s thieves stole an amount of lead off the church roof and the ensuing flawed repairs done with asphalt sealed in damp and led to problems with dry rot in the roof timbers. The timbers and roof slates were replaced throughout the 1960s. However the problem returned in the nave roof and the church had to be closed temporarily on 1 May 1974, with weddings and burials being moved elsewhere. Financial aid from the Diocesan pastoral committee enabled the damp problems to be addressed and the church re-opened.

A new stained glass window was unveiled in the church in July 1997 to commemorate the 50th anniversary of a coach crash which killed nine people on a coach transporting the Bolsterstone Male Voice Choir to a music festival in Holmfirth.

== See also ==
- Listed buildings in Stocksbridge
