= Upper Midhope =

Village in South Yorkshire, England

Coordinates: 53.494°N 1.675°W

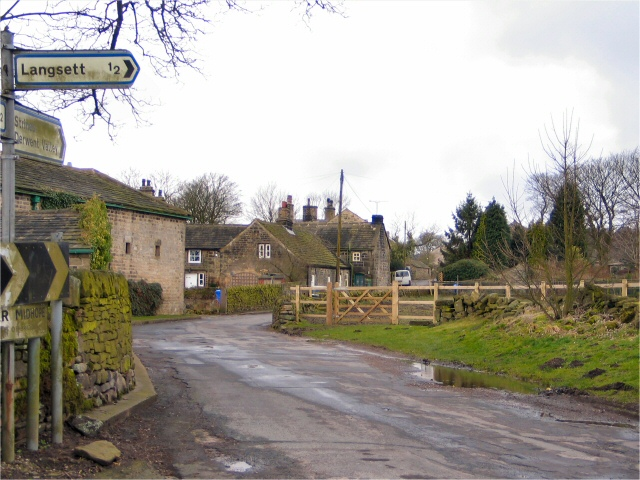
- Upper Midhope

- Location within South Yorkshire
- Metropolitan borough: Sheffield
- Metropolitan county: South Yorkshire
- Region: Yorkshire and the Humber
- Country: England
- Sovereign state: United Kingdom
- Post town: SHEFFIELD
- Postcode district: S36
- Dialling code: 0114
- Police: South Yorkshire
- Fire: South Yorkshire
- Ambulance: Yorkshire
- UK Parliament: Penistone and Stocksbridge

Upper Midhope (archaic Over Midhope) is a hamlet in the civil parish of Bradfield within the Stocksbridge and Upper Don electoral ward in the borough of the City of Sheffield, England. It lies just on the edge of the Peak District national park.

Historically the habitation, together with Nether Midhope (Midhopestones), were collectively known as Midhope.

== Geography and history ==
Upper Midhope, formerly 'Over Midhope', is a hamlet in northwest of civil parish of Bradfield, close to the village of Langsett, located at a local high point between Langsett Reservoir and Midhope Reservoir. Together with the village of Midhopestones (formerly Nether Midhope), the village forms the settlement referred to as Midhope (archaic Middop or Middup).

The Conservation Area Appraisal states that the hamlet dates to at least the medieval period, with records dating back to 1227 and archaeological evidence that goes back further. The hamlet was a traditional rural settlement; its relatively high location led to sheep farming as the main economic activity, bee keeping was also practised. At the end of the 19th century land around Upper Midhope was acquired by Sheffield Corporation for the construction of reservoirs. A number of dwellings were lost during the construction of the Langsett Reservoir, as well as the original connecting road to Langsett. During the 20th century the hamlet became increasingly used as a residential village; as of 2009 most of the hamlet is now residential, including the use of former barns converted to dwellings.

The hamlet was made a conservation area in 1977. There are a number of historic buildings, including four listed structures dating from the 17th or 18th century: Town Head Cottages, and three buildings with cruck frame constructions: Well Bank Farm, Manor Farmhouse, and a set of buildings at Well Bank Farmhouse/Sycamore Cottage.

== See also ==
- Listed buildings in Midhopestones
