= Midhopestones =

Village in South Yorkshire, England

Coordinates: 53.491°N 1.650°W

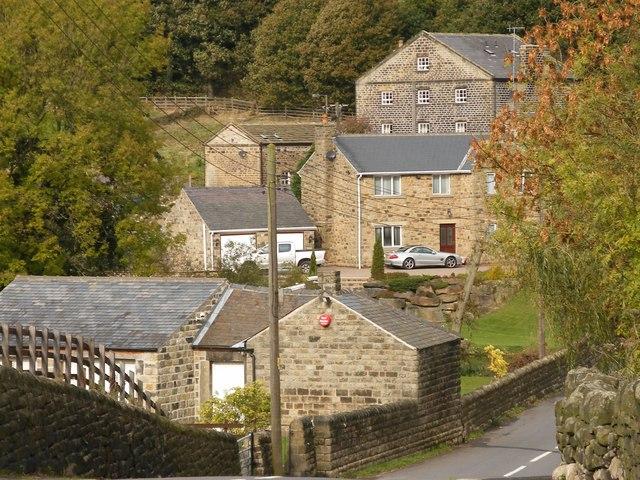
- Midhopestones

- Location within South Yorkshire
- Metropolitan borough: Sheffield
- Metropolitan county: South Yorkshire
- Region: Yorkshire and the Humber
- Country: England
- Sovereign state: United Kingdom
- Post town: SHEFFIELD
- Postcode district: S36
- Dialling code: 01226
- Police: South Yorkshire
- Fire: South Yorkshire
- Ambulance: Yorkshire
- UK Parliament: Penistone and Stocksbridge

Midhopestones (archaic Nether Midhope, also Middup, or Middop) is a village partially in the civil parish of Bradfield within the Stocksbridge and Upper Don electoral ward in the borough of the City of Sheffield, England.

Together with the nearby hamlet of Upper Midhope the two habitations have been collectively known as Midhope.

The boundary of the civil parishes of Langsett in the Metropolitan Borough of Barnsley and Bradfield in the City of Sheffield cuts through Midhopestones.

== Geography ==
Midhopestones is a small village located 10 miles from Barnsley town centre 13 miles from Sheffield city centre, and straddles the border of both Sheffield and Barnsley Metropolitan areas. The village is located in the valley of the Little Don River, south of the A616, and the river, between Underbank Reservoir and Midhope Reservoir.

The village and near environs contains many historic and listed structures, many dating from the 17th or 18th century, typically gritstone built structures, including: Stonecroft cottage; a house and a barn with forge on Miller Lane; houses on Mortimer Road including the Club Inn (since 2002 Ye Olde Mustard Pot), and 'New House'; and houses on Oaks Lane including 'The Oaks', and a cowhouse.

Some structures date to earlier periods including a cowhouse at Midhope Hall Farm, which dates to the 14th century, and includes part of a medieval courthouse in its structure; the present village church of St. James is dated to a 1705 rebuild, the original structure originates from some time in the 14th century.

Also in the near area is the Midhopestones Bridge over the Little Don, circa 1788; a toll bar house from the late 18th century, north of the village and river, and an early 19th-century former inn, both on the former Manchester Road (A616);

== History ==
The name midhope is thought to derive from the Old English words mid (middle) and hop (enclosed or dry place), the suffix 'stones' is thought to refer to stepping stones in the river (now beneath Underbank reservoir), and is not recorded in use before the late 17th century, before the 17th century the village was known as Nether Midhope.

The earliest written record of the place dates to 1227, the village is thought to have had its own manor and lord from the 12th century onwards. The manorial complex had its own chapel dedicated to St. James, in 1368 this was converted to a granary, and a replacement church built. There is documentary evidence from the 19th century of related cruck buildings and a mill.

In 1720 Midhope Pottery was established, producing general household ware. The village grew during the 17th and 18th century, fields were enclosed in the late 17th century, a school was built in 1732, and a toll road, the Mortimer Road, was built from Penistone to Grindleford via Midhope circa 1771. In 1778 a bridge was constructed, replacing an older one destroyed in floods.

Acts of Parliament in the early 19th century led to the construction of the Manchester Road (now the A616), and to extensive field enclosure in the valley. The public house, the "Club Inn" (after 1992 known as the 'Midhopestone Arms', and after 2002 as the 'Ye Olde Mustard Pot'.) was opened in the late 19th century in a converted late 18th century farmhouse. Midhope pottery closed in 1845 due to more industrialised competition.

In 1919 Underbank Reservoir was constructed by Barnsley Corporation: several houses, the river stepping stones and part of the pottery were lost to this development.

As a result of the historical and archaeological interest of the buildings in Midhopestones, and its relatively preserved condition, the village and area was declared a conservation area by Sheffield City Council in 1976.

== See also ==
- Listed buildings in Midhopestones
