= Ewden Valley =

Valley in South Yorkshire, England

Coordinates: 53.461°N 1.591°W

Ewden Village
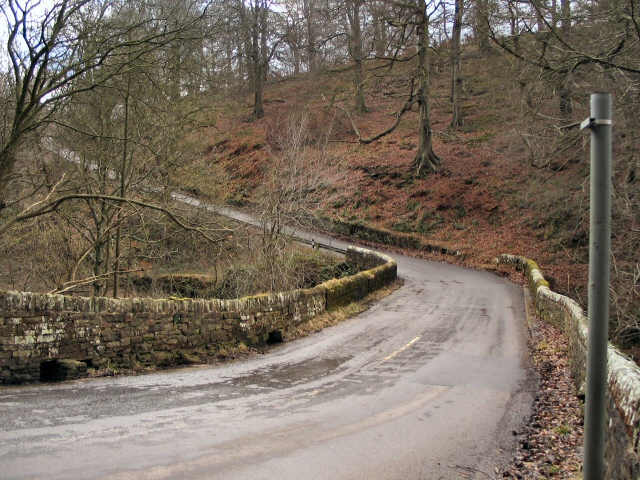
- Ewden Bridge, crossing the Ewden Beck

- Location within South Yorkshire
- Metropolitan borough: Sheffield
- Metropolitan county: South Yorkshire
- Region: Yorkshire and the Humber
- Country: England
- Sovereign state: United Kingdom
- Post town: SHEFFIELD
- Postcode district: S36
- Dialling code: 0114
- Police: South Yorkshire
- Fire: South Yorkshire
- Ambulance: Yorkshire
- UK Parliament: Penistone and Stocksbridge

Ewden Valley is a valley in the civil parish of Bradfield in the Stocksbridge and Upper Don electoral ward of Sheffield, South Yorkshire, England.

Ewden Village is located between the Moor Hall and Broomhead reservoirs, close to and south of Bolsterstone, within the civil parish of Stocksbridge. Work on the construction of the two reservoirs was started by Sheffield Corporation in 1913. The reservoirs' construction site was served by the now closed Ewden Railway which connected with the Great Central Railway's Woodhead line in Wharncliffe Wood. A timber built village was constructed to house workers working on the Morehall and Broomhead reservoirs. The village was completed in 1929. By 1969 only 15 of over 70 buildings were occupied, and by the 21st century the village was practically abandoned. By 2008 a single worker's cottage remained from the original navvy village.

Ewden Beck flows from Broomhead Moor, eastwards, supplying the Broomhead reservoir. Excess outfall flows into the River Don. Ewden Height is a local high point in the region at 375 m (1,230 ft).

On the south side of the beck, upstream of the reservoirs and Ewden road bridge are prehistoric earthworks and other remains: there is a Bronze Age cemetery of around 30 round barrows, typically less than 3m diameter and 0.2 to 1 m (7.9 in to 3 ft 3.4 in) high, which are crossed by an earthwork 'Broomhead Dyke', around 1,200 m (3,900 ft) long, running roughly parallel to the beck; there is also a 20 m (66 ft) diameter ring cairn around 100m north of the cemetery.

== See also ==
- Broomhead Hall
