= Rockley Wilson =

English cricketer

Personal information
- Full name: Evelyn Rockley Wilson
- Born: 25 March 1879; Bolsterstone, Stocksbridge, Yorkshire, England
- Died: 21 July 1957 (aged 78); Winchester, Hampshire, England
- Batting: Right-handed
- Bowling: Right-arm slow
- Relatives: Clem Wilson (brother); Rowland Wilson (brother)

International information
- National side: England

Career statistics
Competition	Tests	First-class
Matches	1	136
Runs scored	10	3,565
Batting average	5.00	22.00
100s/50s	0/0	4/15
Top score	5	142
Balls bowled	123	23,852
Wickets	3	467
Bowling average	12.00	17.63
5 wickets in innings	0	26
10 wickets in match	0	5
Best bowling	2/28	7/16
Catches/stumpings	0/–	106/–

Evelyn Rockley Wilson (25 March 1879 – 21 July 1957) was an English amateur first-class cricketer, who played for Cambridge University Cricket Club, Yorkshire, and England.

== Life ==
Wilson was born in Bolsterstone, Stocksbridge, Yorkshire, and educated at Bilton Grange, Rugby and Trinity College, Cambridge, where he graduated BA in 1901 and MA in 1905. An amateur whose main profession was as a schoolmaster for 43 years at Winchester College (1903–1946), Wilson bowled slow right-arm spinners that move either way off the pitch, and batted well enough to score a century on first-class cricket debut, and another one in the annual Varsity match. He played a little for Yorkshire from 1899, but after leaving Cambridge in 1902, he then played no first-class cricket for the next ten years, preferring, he said, to play three club matches a week rather than two county games.

But after turning down an approach in 1913 by Hampshire, where he lived, he was persuaded to rejoin Yorkshire, the county of his birth, and stayed with them until 1923, playing mostly in the August school holidays. He played 66 times for Yorkshire.

He served in the First World War in the army, being commissioned Lieutenant in the Rifle Brigade before transferring to intelligence staff work. He demobilised as captain in 1919.

In 1920, at the age of 41, he bowled so successfully that he finished fourth in the national averages, and was given leave from Winchester to tour Australia with the 1920–21 Marylebone Cricket Club (MCC) team, led by Johnny Douglas. In a disastrous series in which the Australia national cricket team won all five Tests, Wilson made his Test debut at the age of 41 years and 337 days, the second oldest debutant in English cricket (after James Southerton in the first Test match of them all in 1877). He scored five in each innings and took three wickets cheaply, but England still lost the match.

Wilson ran into trouble on the tour for filing reports back to the Daily Express newspaper. As a result, when he subsequently encountered Lord Harris in the Long Room at Lord's, the encounter was frosty. Harris offered him only the most cursory of handshakes, and Wilson observed, loudly enough for Harris to hear as he moved on, "Lucky to get a touch really, lucky to get a touch."

Known as a witty, self-deprecating man, Wilson is credited as an influence on several generations of public school cricketers at Winchester. Amongst his pupils was Douglas Jardine. Just before the 1932-33 Bodyline series, Wilson was asked by a journalist what England's prospects were under Jardine's captaincy. "He might well win us the Ashes," Wilson said, "but he might lose us a Dominion."

His brother, Clem Wilson, also played for Yorkshire and England, and an older brother, Rowland, played fleetingly for Cambridge University.

Wilson died in July 1957 in Winchester, Hampshire, aged 78.
