= Broomhead Reservoir =

Reservoir in South Yorkshire, England

Coordinates: 53°27′35″N 01°35′47″W

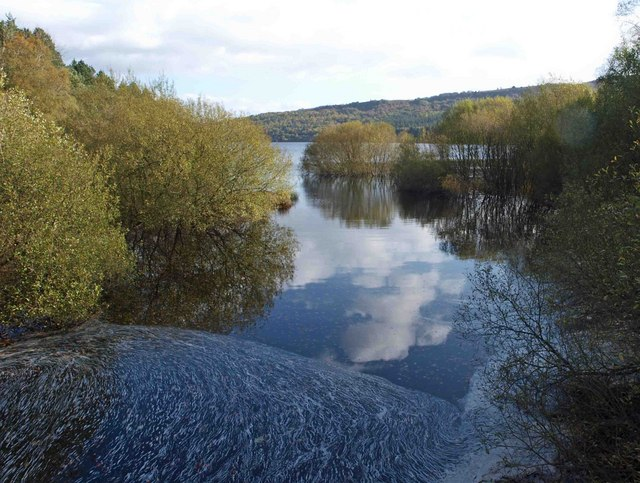
The reservoir in 2008

Broomhead Reservoir is a reservoir located in the Ewden Valley, near Sheffield in South Yorkshire, England. The reservoir is located to the south of Bolsterstone and is linked to the More Hall Reservoir to the east. It covers 50 hectares (120 acres) of land and can hold more than 1,000 million gallons of water.

== History ==
The reservoir, like the neighbouring More Hall Reservoir, was first planned by the Corporation of Sheffield in the late 19th century after a chronic shortage of clean water around the city had led to outbreaks of cholera. Broomhead was planned to be the main "supply" reservoir. Following a dispute over who owned the rights to the land, construction of the reservoirs started in 1913, but was interrupted because of the outbreak of the First World War, and did not restart until 1920. Four years later, workers noticed a land slip north of the reservoir site while digging a channel, which required a 50-foot drain and removing 400,000 cubic yards of soil to fix.

Work was completed in 1934. Ground movement continued to be problematic after the reservoir began to be used, and required further remodelling the landscape and removing another 160,000 cubic yards of soil. In all, remedial work on the reservoirs is believed to have cost as much as the original construction.

The reservoir was originally maintained by the Sheffield Corporation Waterworks department. It is now operated by Yorkshire Water.

== Tourism ==
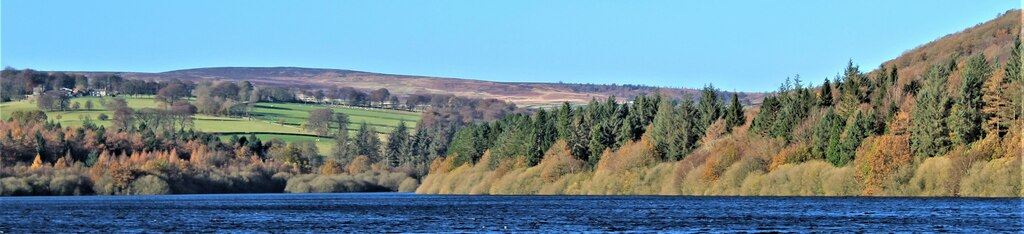
Panoramic view of the reservoir

The reservoir and surrounding land are open for ramblers. In 2014, the weir leading the reservoir was unblocked to allow wild brown trout to reach it for the first time. Fishing is allowed in the reservoir, as is sailing and water sports.

Broomhead, like several other reservoirs, has people swimming in hot weather. In 2012, a group set up a camp by the reservoir and built a rope swing for people to dive into the water. Yorkshire Water condemned the action, highlighting the reservoir has a strong current that could prove fatal even for experienced swimmers. Despite signs reading "Cold water kills – bathing prohibited" around the reservoir, it has continued to attract open water swimmers.

== Bibliography ==
- Jones, Melvyn; Jones, Joan (2019). A-Z of Sheffield: Places-People-History. Amberley Publishing. ISBN 978-1-4456-8184-9.
