= George More (recusant) =

English Catholic conspirator (born 1542)

George More (born 1542) was an English supporter of Mary, Queen of Scots, and a participant in the Throckmorton Plot. A Catholic exiled in the Spanish Netherlands, he visited the royal court of Scotland in 1598.

== Background ==
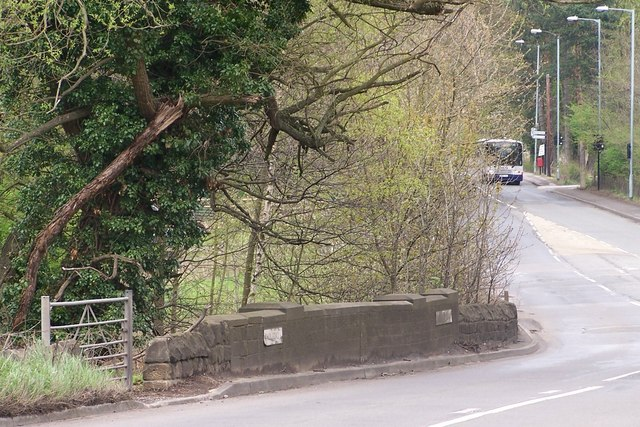
More Hall bridge near Wharncliffe Side and Wharncliffe Crags, close to the site of More Hall

He was the son of Francis More or Moore and Agnes Bozon, a daughter of Sir Richard Bozon of Barrowby and Long Clawson. Francis More's family lived at More Hall, at Bradfield near Sheffield, and he came to own a property at Orston. He was a dependent of the Earls of Shrewsbury. An old ballad, the Dragon of Wantley, refers to More Hall.

== Carrying letters for Mary, Queen of Scots, and the Throckmorton Plot ==
Francis More had offered to help Mary, Queen of Scots. In 1569 he carried a letter from her to the Earl of Northumberland with the gift of an enamelled silver chain for the Countess of Northumberland. Francis More fled England with his son to Milan.

After his father's death George More again carried letters for Mary, Queen of Scots. His uncle, Edward More, had a house near Sheffield, conveniently close to Mary's lodgings at Sheffield Manor and Sheffield Castle. Edward More was a prisoner in the Tower of London in March 1584, and Mary hoped the French ambassador in London, Michel de Castelnau would give him some money.

George More was arrested and questioned in the Tower of London in December 1583 about his travels abroad and dealings with Mary, and whether he knew Charles Paget and Thomas Morgan, now known for their roles in the Throckmorton Plot and the subsequent Babington Plot conspiracies.

More was released after talking to Francis Walsingham and making a deal. He answered the questions in writing, explaining that his father had sent him to be a student at Douai. He knew Paget, a former Shrewsbury retainer, but not Morgan. He had negotiated a £200 credit deal for Mary with the Earl of Shrewsbury for carrying her letters to Paget.

For Walsingham, a key piece of evidence for Mary's involvement in plots against Elizabeth I was a confession made by a servant of George More. The servant said he had carried a letter from Mary to the Earl of Arundel.

Letters in code from Mary, Queen of Scots, sent to the French ambassador Michel de Castelnau, mentioning George More as a letter carrier were discovered in the Bibliothèque nationale de France and deciphered in 2023.

== Exile in 1593 ==
Following his involvement with Nicholas Williamson at the 1593 Easter fish weir riot between the supporters of the Stanhopes and the Earl of Shrewsbury, he feared proceedings against him by the Earl of Huntingdon and the Archbishop of York. He left England, and went to Flanders, where he did not wish to associate with Robert Persons. He lived for a time at Liège, and in August 1597 wrote a lengthy letter to William Cecil, seeking religious toleration and the rehabilitation of Charles Neville, 6th Earl of Westmorland. The letter was printed by John Strype.

Richard Topcliffe described More in June 1595 as a friend of Edmund Thurland from Gamston near Tuxford and Bawtry, who had lived near Long Longnedham (Leadenham) between Grantham and Lincoln. Thurland had been brought up in, or spent time in Spain with Isabel de Cárdenas, Duchess of Feria. Topcliffe wrote that More and Nicholas Williamson had fled to the enemy, that More was a pensioner of Spain, and the three were in cahoots. Thurland's house at Gamston on Idle had been a convenient location for traffic with Scotland on the North Road and the lodgings of Mary, Queen of Scots.

== Scotland in 1598 ==
After the death of William Cecil, he decided to return to England. He met James Reade, an Englishman from Watermillock, at Copenhagen and told him his plans. In September 1598, he came to Scotland in Robert Lukeup's ship from Helsingør. He brought his wife, son, two daughters, and two servants. An English diplomat in Edinburgh, George Nicholson was suspicious, and asked the Provost of Edinburgh, Henry Nisbet, to question him and his family, but Nisbet said this was not possible without a royal warrant.

Nicholson warned James VI. He interviewed More on 18 September. More told Nicholson his story, and that he was a friend of Nicholas Williamson. He had an introduction to William Schaw (a friend of Alexander Seton) and Patrick Morton. More went to the royal court at Dalkeith Palace the next day, wanting to speak to William Schaw. Schaw and William Hunter brought him to speak with James VI in a private gallery. Hunter was a Scottish merchant and credit broker who had settled in England. He had dealings with John Williams, a Cheapside goldsmith, and in April 1603 brought John Harington's Lantern to Holyroodhouse.

Nicholson heard that James VI thought George More was only seeking letters of recommendation to help him return to England. Roger Aston also wrote to Sir Robert Cecil, describing what More said in this meeting. More claimed to have refused Spanish offers to work against Queen Elizabeth and was now impoverished, without "one penny to buy his dinner".

Nicholson thought his approach to William Shaw, a known Catholic, was suspicious. Aston described Schaw as "master of works and controller of the house", perhaps meaning that Schaw, an occasional signatory of the royal household books, was administrator of the household of Anne of Denmark at Dalkeith during her pregnancy. He certainly prepared the queen's bedchamber and nursery at Dalkeith for the birth of Princess Margaret. Patrick Morton was a carver at the royal table.

More wrote to Sir Robert Cecil from his lodging in Leith on 14 January 1599, professing his service to Queen Elizabeth, and giving some news of Spanish invasion scares. He enclosed a letter to the Earl of Shrewsbury, his old acquaintance. He described to Shrewsbury how he had left the Spanish dominions in 1595, and appealed in England against judgements for his recusancy. More assured Shrewsbury of his wish to serve Elizabeth I against Spain.

== Elizabeth More returns to Yorkshire ==
On 12 May 1599 he wrote to Matthew Hutton, Archbishop of York, seeking rehabilitation, and that he had sent his wife Elizabeth to him. He wrote to Cecil, referring to his exile in Scotland as a "devilish desert". She was not able to make her journey until the end of May. She and her children were arrested at York and were still there in November, while George More stayed in Scotland.

His wife was Elizabeth Mountford or Momforth, daughter of George Mountford of Hackford or Hackforth in Hornby. They had seven children. She wrote to Sir Robert Cecil asking for her husband's pardon and relief in 1599, presumably from York.

More returned to Liège by 1601. Disenchanted with Scotland, he criticised James VI's habits and his relationship with Anne of Denmark. He thought the King supported the Earl of Essex, but the Earl's supporters only pretended to reciprocate.
