= Francis Wortley =

Francis Wortley may refer to:

- Francis Wortley of Wortley, High Sheriff of Derbyshire 1577, Custos Rotulorum of the West Riding of Yorkshire, 1579–1583
- Sir Francis Wortley, 1st Baronet (1591–1652), poet and Royalist officer in the English Civil War
- Sir Francis Wortley, 2nd Baronet (c. 1616–1665), of the Wortley baronets

== See also ==
- Dragon of Wantley, a 1767 poem about Sir Francis Wortley
