= Wharncliffe Side =

Village in South Yorkshire, England

Coordinates: 53.450°N 1.554°W

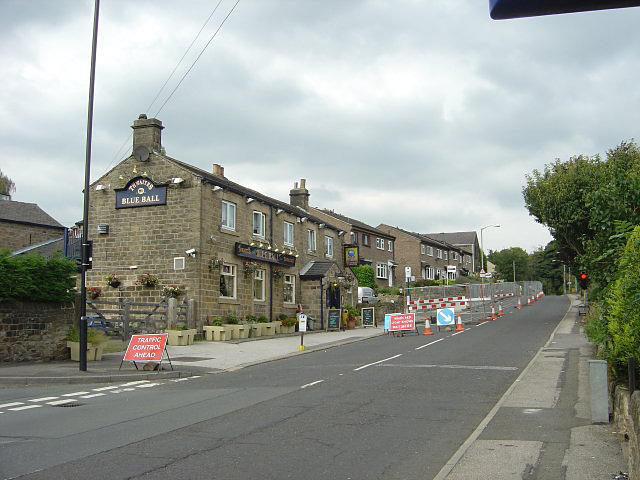
- The Blue Ball pub at Wharncliffe Side

- Location within South Yorkshire
- Civil parish: Bradfield
- Metropolitan borough: Sheffield
- Metropolitan county: South Yorkshire
- Region: Yorkshire and the Humber
- Country: England
- Sovereign state: United Kingdom
- Post town: SHEFFIELD
- Postcode district: S35
- Dialling code: 0114
- Police: South Yorkshire
- Fire: South Yorkshire
- Ambulance: Yorkshire
- UK Parliament: Penistone and Stocksbridge

Wharncliffe Side is a village in South Yorkshire, England, northwest of Sheffield and within the city borough.

Wharcliffe Side is located on the west bank of the River Don, approximately six miles (9.7 km) northwest of Sheffield city centre, and one mile (1.6 km) northwest of Oughtibridge, south of the confluence of the Ewden beck and the River Don. The village is at an elevation of 435 feet (133 m) and the A6102 road passes through the village.

The village has a population of 1355 as of 2011, and is a commuter village for Sheffield and Stocksbridge. The village is within the Stocksbridge and Upper Don electoral ward. There is a primary school on Brighthomelee Lane, along with a post office and two public houses within the village. Glen Howe Park is situated at the southern end of the village. The ancient farming hamlet of Brightholmlee lies 1/2 mile (0.80 km) to the west.

== See also ==
- Wharncliffe Crags, river Don valley landmark north of the village, associated with the legend of the Dragon of Wantley
