= Wotton House =

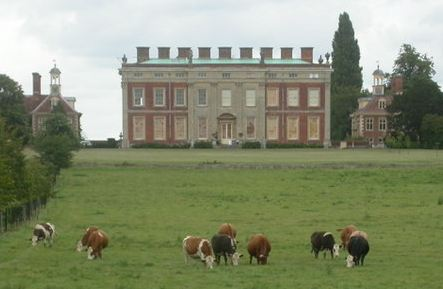

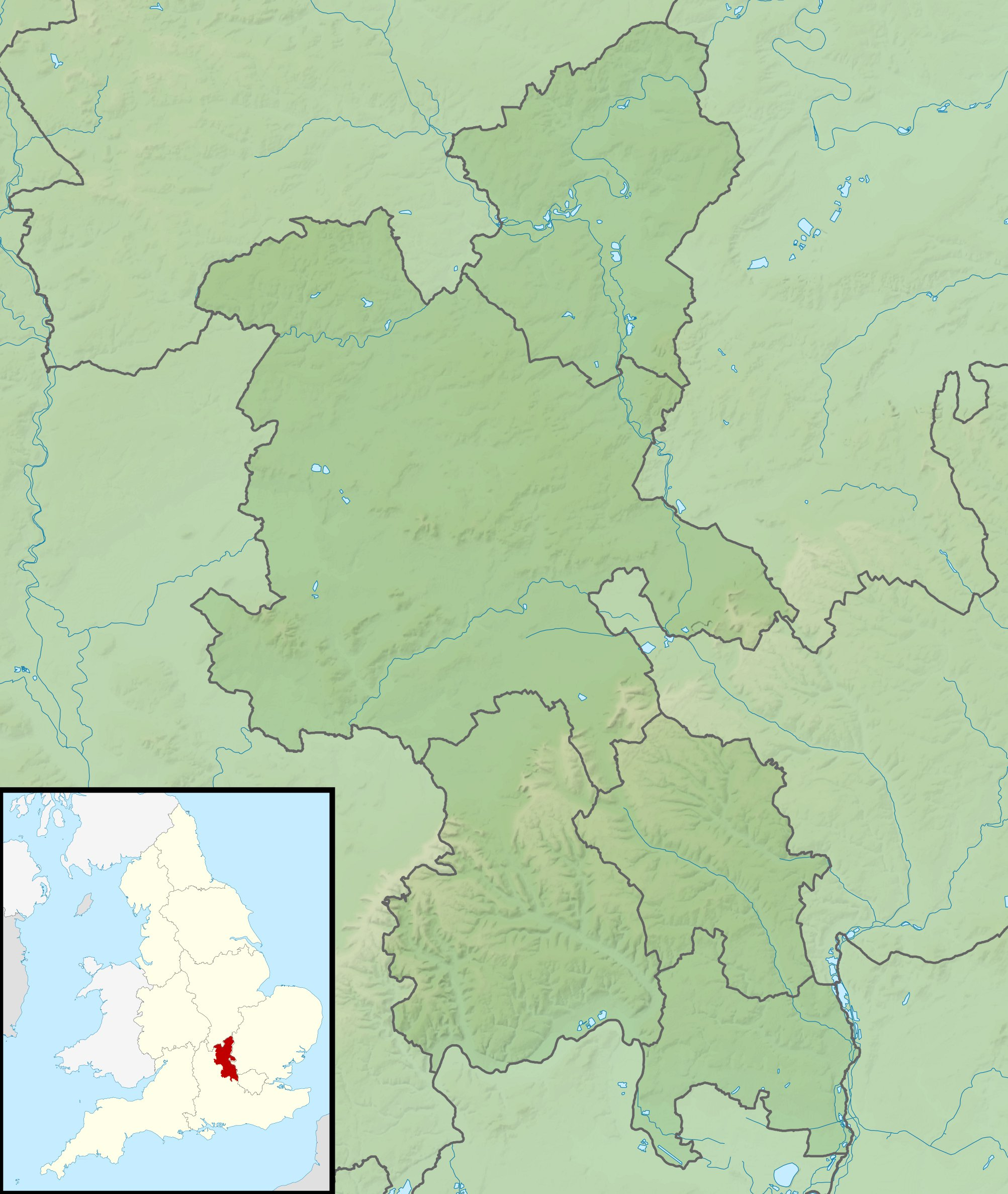
- Location within Buckinghamshire
- 51.8401°N 1.0065°W
- Type: House
- Location: Wotton Underwood, Buckinghamshire

History
- Built: 1704-1714

Site notes
- Architect(s): William Winde, later John Soane
- Architectural style: English Baroque
- Governing body: Private

Listed Building – Grade I
- Official name: Wotton House, with walls to pavilions
- Designated: 25 October 1951
- Reference no.: 1124221

Listed Building – Grade I
- Official name: The Clock Pavilion, Wotton House
- Designated: 25 October 1951
- Reference no.: 1275066

Listed Building – Grade I
- Official name: The South Pavilion, Wotton House
- Designated: 25 October 1951
- Reference no.: 1332825

Listed Building – Grade I
- Official name: Entrance Gates and screen across east front of Wotton House, with gazebo and walls to pavilions
- Designated: 25 October 1951
- Reference no.: 1124222

Wotton House, Wotton Underwood, Buckinghamshire, England, is a stately home built between 1704 and 1714, to a design very similar to that of the contemporary version of Buckingham House. The house is an example of English Baroque and a Grade I listed building. The architect is uncertain although William Winde, the designer of Buckingham House, has been suggested. The grounds were laid out by George London and Henry Wise with a formal parterre and a double elm avenue leading down to a lake.

Fifty years later William Pitt the Elder and Capability Brown improved the landscape, creating pleasure grounds with two lakes. After a fire gutted the main house in 1820 Richard Grenville, 1st Earl Temple, commissioned John Soane to rebuild it.

After the 3rd Duke of Buckingham and Chandos, the last direct Grenville male heir, died in 1889, the house was let to a succession of tenants; including, notably; the philanthropist, Leo Bernard William Bonn (1850–1929) who became deaf while residing at Wotton, and later founded (1911) what became the RNID. His son and heir, the decorated First World War hero, Major Walter Basil Louis Bonn, DSO, MC, MA (Oxon.) FRSA, FZSL (1885–1973) is also listed as resident at Wotton House; in the New College archives, at Oxford University; during his three years as an Oxford undergraduate, there, 1903–1906, while living fifteen miles away from his family home of many years, at Wotton House.

In 1929 Wotton was bought by Major Michael Beaumont MP who renovated it. In 1947 Beaumont sold the estate to a charity who divided the grounds into small parcels and let the main house to two boys' schools. By 1957 the house had become derelict and was due to be demolished when Elaine Brunner found it and with the help of the architect Donald Insall restored most of the Soane features. Her daughter and son-in-law David Gladstone have continued the work she started. The main house is now owned by David Gladstone.

The South Pavilion (the former coach house) was sold separately in 1947. It has had a number of notable owners including Sir Arthur Bryant and Sir John Gielgud, and is now co-owned by former British Prime Minister Tony Blair and his wife Cherie.

== History ==
Armorials of Grenville of Wotton Underwood, Buckinghamshire: Vert, on a cross argent five torteaux

Since the twelfth century there had been a manor house at Wotton Underwood owned by the Grenville family. In 1644 Francis Wortley was captured here by the Roundheads.

In 1704 Richard Grenville (1646–1719) built Wotton House on a new site on a mound looking down to a natural lake. The design was very similar to that of Buckingham House which was built at the same time and later became Buckingham Palace. The architect is unknown, but Sir Howard Colvin suggested John Fitch; (Note: John Fitch is not represented in Howard Colvin (1995), A Biographical Dictionary of British architects, 3rd ed.) John Millar believes it could be by Elizabeth Wilbraham; while Historic England suggests William Winde, whom Pevsner also references.

In 1749 Richard Grenville, the elder brother of George Grenville (Prime Minister between 1763 and 1765), inherited Stowe House through his wife Hester, sister of Viscount Cobham. Wotton was then run in tandem with Stowe by the Viscount Cobham as owner. A fire destroyed the interior of the house in 1820 but the coach house and kitchen pavilion (the "Clock Pavilion") survived intact. Richard Grenville, Earl Temple (later Duke of Buckingham and Chandos), immediately engaged John Soane to restore the main house. Soane lowered the house, removing the top floor and reducing the height of the first floor windows, giving it a Georgian proportion. He made inventive use of the existing floor plans and created a three-storey, top-lit "Tribune", alongside a new stone staircase, in place of the old entrance hall. With its Soane interiors Wotton had a succession of Grenville occupiers until 1889, when the 3rd Duke of Buckingham, the last direct male heir, died, the house was let to a succession of tenants. It was rented and then bought by Michael Beaumont (MP for Aylesbury) in 1929 and had it renovated by the architect Arthur Stanley George Butler, (Note: Butler is better known as the author of publications concerning Sir Edwin Lutyens.) concealing all of Soane's detailing including the central three-storey tribune.

When Beaumont moved to County Kildare in Ireland, the house was sold to a charity, the Merchant Venturers of Bristol. It was neglected down through the Second World War (when it was not requisitioned), but it was put up for sale shortly thereafter. After the war much of the grounds were sold in small parcels and in the early 1950s the building was used by two boys' boarding schools, Wotton House Boys' School followed by Cokethorpe School (since relocated to near Witney).

=== Restoration of the main house ===
Elaine (Mrs Patrick) Brunner purchased the main house and the Clock Pavilion from Buckinghamshire County Council for £6,000 in 1957, two weeks before it was scheduled for demolition. Brunner engaged Donald Insall Associates to carry out extensive work on the house, repairing the dilapidations, undoing most of the Butler alterations and restoring Soane's architectural details. However, the central feature of Soane's redesign, the "Tribune", which had been destroyed by Butler, was still unrestored when she died in 1998. The house passed to April, Brunner's daughter and her husband David Gladstone. (Note: David Gladstone is a retired British diplomat and a descendant of the Victorian Prime Minister, William Gladstone.) The grounds are open to the public at least one day a week during the summer months, but viewing of the house is by appointment only. In 2007 David Gladstone held a conference at Wotton in an attempt to determine the name of the original architect of the house. The conference generated at least two follow up papers: Howard Colvin (2010) proposed that John Fitch may have been the original architect, and later the same year John Millar (2010) proposed that it may have been Elizabeth Wilbraham (1632–1705). (Note: Colvin's paper was published in the 2010 Georgian Group Journal (Millar 2010))

=== Conversion of the Coach House into the South Pavilion ===
The original Coach House (later re-christened the South Pavilion) and the walled formal garden were purchased by Tristram Gilbert and Andre DuGuay shortly before Elaine Brunner purchased the main house. They restored both and lived there until about 1965. The walled garden was opened to the public. The South Pavilion was sold to Sir Arthur Bryant, the historian and subsequently to Sir John Gielgud who (as photographs show), further restored it. In 2000 Gielgud died in residence there. In 2008 it was bought by Tony and Cherie Blair for £4m.

== History of the grounds ==
In 1726, Richard Grenville inherited from his father the Wotton estate, which yielded a rental income of over £3,000 per annum. In 1735, he introduced an inclosure act in Parliament which cleared the area of dwellings, enabling the transformation during the 1750s of the London & Wise garden into the new style of natural landscape. In 1754, another Hester, sister of Richard and George, married William Pitt the Elder at Wotton and soon took over the project that Richard had envisioned. By that date Richard had taken over at Stowe and George was living at Wotton. Capability Brown had left Stowe House in 1749, where he had been working as head gardener and was brought in to help Pitt execute the project, in particular the extensive water works. It is not known exactly what the relative roles and contributions of Pitt and Brown were, although Pitt was a well-known landscape designer in his own right. The Pleasure Grounds cover 200 acres (81 ha) and incorporate two lakes, one of 35 acres (14 ha) and one of 12 acres (4.9 ha), joined by a canal. They are enclosed within a circular belt, as was common at the time, and the visitor encounters a series of temples, bridges and statues along the circuit.

In April 1786, John Adams (the future second President of the United States on tour with Thomas Jefferson – who would serve as his vice-president before becoming president himself) spent a few days visiting some stately homes to the north west of London, and one of those they visited was Wotton. On their return to London Adams wrote "Stowe, Hagley, and Blenheim, are superb; Woburn, Caversham, and the Leasowes are beautiful. Wotton is both great and elegant, though neglected". Jefferson noted in his diary: "But two gardeners. Much neglected". On hearing of the historically dilapidated state of the Park; on 17 April 1988, and following attendance of Divine Service, at the neighbouring Buckinghamshire Parish Church of Dinton (see Parish News: May 2018, 30th Anniversary Royal Visit) Princess Margaret, Countess of Snowdon, decided to make a dendrologically inspired visit to Wotton House, during the tenure of a thespian acquaintance; Sir John Gielgud; and while staying with the Cotton family, at nearby Tythrop Park; Princess Margaret thus undertook an informal Royal Visit, in order to view the gates, park, and South Pavilion, at Wotton; accompanied by the former (1901–1911) Wotton House resident's great-grandson (Commissioner Philip Bonn of the International Tree Protection Commission – ITPC) together with the Princess's friend; Mr Ned Ryan; and the RPS; who followed at a discreet distance behind the Princess's Rolls-Royce; containing the Princess and the guests from the weekend house party at Tythrop Park, Kingsley, in an adjoining district of Buckinghamshire.

All the grounds were sold by Major Beaumont in 1947 and were bought by neighbouring farmers in parcels. Between 1957 and 1985 Elaine Brunner gradually bought back 400 acres (160 ha) of the grounds. Since 1998 David Gladstone has overseen the restoration of much of the original scheme by his estate manager, Michael Harrison.

== Sources ==
- Adams, John; Adams, Charles Francis (1851). The Works of John Adams, Second President of the United States: Autobiography, continued. Diary. Essays and controversial papers of the Revolution. Vol. 3. Little, Brown. p. 394.
- New College, University of Oxford (academic records and bursary records) Walter Basil Louis Bonn, BA (Honours) MA c/o Leo Bonn, Esq, Wotton House (1903–1906)
- Bellot, L.J. (1993). "Wild hares and red herrings: a case study of estate management in the eighteenth-century English countryside". The Huntington Library Quarterly. 56 (1): 15–39. doi:10.2307/3817717. JSTOR 3817717.
- Hyams, Edward (1971). Humphry Repton and Capability Brown.
- Jones, Sam (5 May 2008). "Blairs pay £4m for Gielgud's former home". The Guardian. London.
- Millar, John (11 November 2010). "The first woman architect". Architects' Journal.
- Pevsner, Nikolaus; Williamson, Elizabeth (2003). Buckinghamshire. The Buildings of England. Yale University Press. ISBN 0-300-09584-8.
- Ptolemy, Dean (10 April 1998). "Obituary of Elaine Brunner". The Independent. Archived from the original on 7 May 2022.. The obituary discusses the restoration of the house.
- Staff (2011). "Wotton House". Vip Internet Limited. Archived from the original on 31 March 2012.
- Stroud, Dorothy (1984). Sir John Soane, Architect.
- "The Pleasure Grounds". Wotton House. 11 May 2015a.
- "Early History of the Grenville Family". Wotton House. 17 July 2015b.
- "The House After the Grenvilles". Wotton House. 17 July 2015c.
