= William Hunter (merchant) =

Merchant and Information broker

- Born: Scotland
- Occupations: Merchant, ship owner, and spy
- Years active: 1590s
- Known for: Gathered intelligence in Spain for England

William Hunter was a Scottish merchant based in Edinburgh and Bristol active in the 1590s, who exported Scottish linen, and gathered intelligence in Spain for England.

Hunter was a merchant, ship owner, and credit broker who had links in England, and married a wealthy woman from Bristol, the widow of a dyer. He had some dealings with John Williams, a Cheapside goldsmith. He called himself "banker to the King of Scotland". He traded with Portugal and exported English goods from Norwich to Spain, avoiding an English trade embargo in time of war.

== Hunter's petition ==
Around the year 1601, with the blessing of James VI of Scotland, Hunter sent a petition to Elizabeth I which gives some details of his activities and willingness to spy for England. In 1588 he had sent his servant or employee, Patrick Morris, from St Lucar in Spain to London, with intelligence of the preparations and sailing dates of the Spanish Armada. Hunter himself came into suspicion in Spain and he was imprisoned for a time. His service was recognised in England but Hunter had not been given a promised reward, which included a licence to import beer. Hunter had visited Elizabeth at Whitehall Palace and had an audience with her in the presence of the Lord Admiral, Charles Howard, 1st Earl of Nottingham. Hunter claimed that Elizabeth was glad he had not been beheaded by the Spanish and said she would rather have lost her own little finger and played worse on the virginals all her days.

Patrick Morris was rewarded by Francis Walsingham. He was a double-agent, turned by Bernardino de Mendoza. Mendoza planned to stage Morris' arrest in Spain in October 1588.

Another time, at Greenwich Palace, Hunter and the Scottish diplomat William Keith of Delny spoke to Elizabeth in the garden. In 1597 Hunter liaised with the Earl of Nottingham and sent two ships to Spain. His godson, William Wemyss, went on to Panama to meet Hunter's foster brother. Wemyss was to settle in Spain as his factor and spy for England. Wemyss was soon discovered and fled to England. Another of his servants Edward Forman, his factor in Bristol, was sent to Spain at this time and captured. This had cost Hunter money and valuable merchandise.

== News from Scotland and Norway ==
In 1589 Hunter sailed with James VI to Norway to meet Anne of Denmark. Hunter had agreed to send updates to an English diplomat in Edinburgh, William Ashby. He wrote from Oslo on 29 November 1589 with news of the meeting and marriage, and an accident at Flekkerøy:

"Thair was a boy off our schip that was schot with a pece of ordenance owt off the Kingis schip - at the departour of Stean Belde - be neglegence off the gwner, quho thoght thair had bene no schott in hir. This schip is send back agane with suche personis in hir as ar nocht fwnd meit to ramane heir"
There was a boy of our ship that was shot with a piece of ordnance out off the King's ship - at the departure of Steen Bille, by negligence of the gunner, who thought there had been no shot in her. This ship is sent back again [to Scotland] with such persons in her as are not found meet to remain here.

In July 1591 Hunter sent news to William Cecil of the search for the rebel, Francis Stewart, 5th Earl of Bothwell. James VI had gone Kelso but there was news of Bothwell at Aberdeen. Hunter wrote, "Mirrie companyouns say atte thair wyne that all our trubillis ar bott tryfills to gett moir gowld frome Ingland, and thay seik my Loird Boithwell whear thay knaw he is nott, for Aberdene is neir fowr scoir mylis derrect north frome Edinburgh and Kellso is twenty eight mylis derrect sowth frome Edinburgh" - Merry companions say at their wine that all our troubles are but trifles to get more gold from England, and they seek my Lord Bothwell where they know he is not, for Aberdeen is near four score miles direct north from Edinburgh and Kelso is twenty eight miles direct south from Edinburgh.

In 1596, Anne of Denmark wrote to the Council of Denmark for a passport for William Hunter to travel to collect Norwegian timber. Timber from Norway and the Baltic was widely used in Scottish buildings at this time.

In 1598, an English Catholic exile, George More came to Scotland. He went to the royal court at Dalkeith Palace, wanting to speak to the courtier William Schaw. Schaw and William Hunter brought him to speak with James VI in a private gallery.

In May 1599 an English diplomat William Bowes noted that Hunter was now in the service of King James but may have become a denizen of England following his marriage, which would affect his legal rights in England and his ability to claim such privileges due to a "stranger" or foreigner. Hunter, with his wife Agnes, was made free to trade in Bristol as dyer from November 1597, as Agnes' late husband had done, as a reward from Elizabeth for his services. The Privy Council letter at that time called him a gentleman of Scotland. Hunter himself was not recorded as burgess of Bristol. Huntar's attempt to trade in Scotland claiming advantages in the "person of a stranger" was rejected by the Court of Session.

== John Harington's lantern ==
In April 1603 Hunter brought John Harington's poem, The Lantern to King James at Holyroodhouse. He may have known Harington through his marriage to Agnes in Bristol, as Harington's home at Kelston was only eight miles away. Hunter and Sir Thomas Erskine wrote to Harington that James had received the emblem lantern "exceeding kindly". Hunter replied to a metaphor of spinning and carding referring to Harington's wife, Mary Rogers, as a trope of domesticity.
