= Glen Howe Park =

Park in Wharncliffe Side, South Yorkshire, England

Coordinates: 53.444606°N 1.558793°W

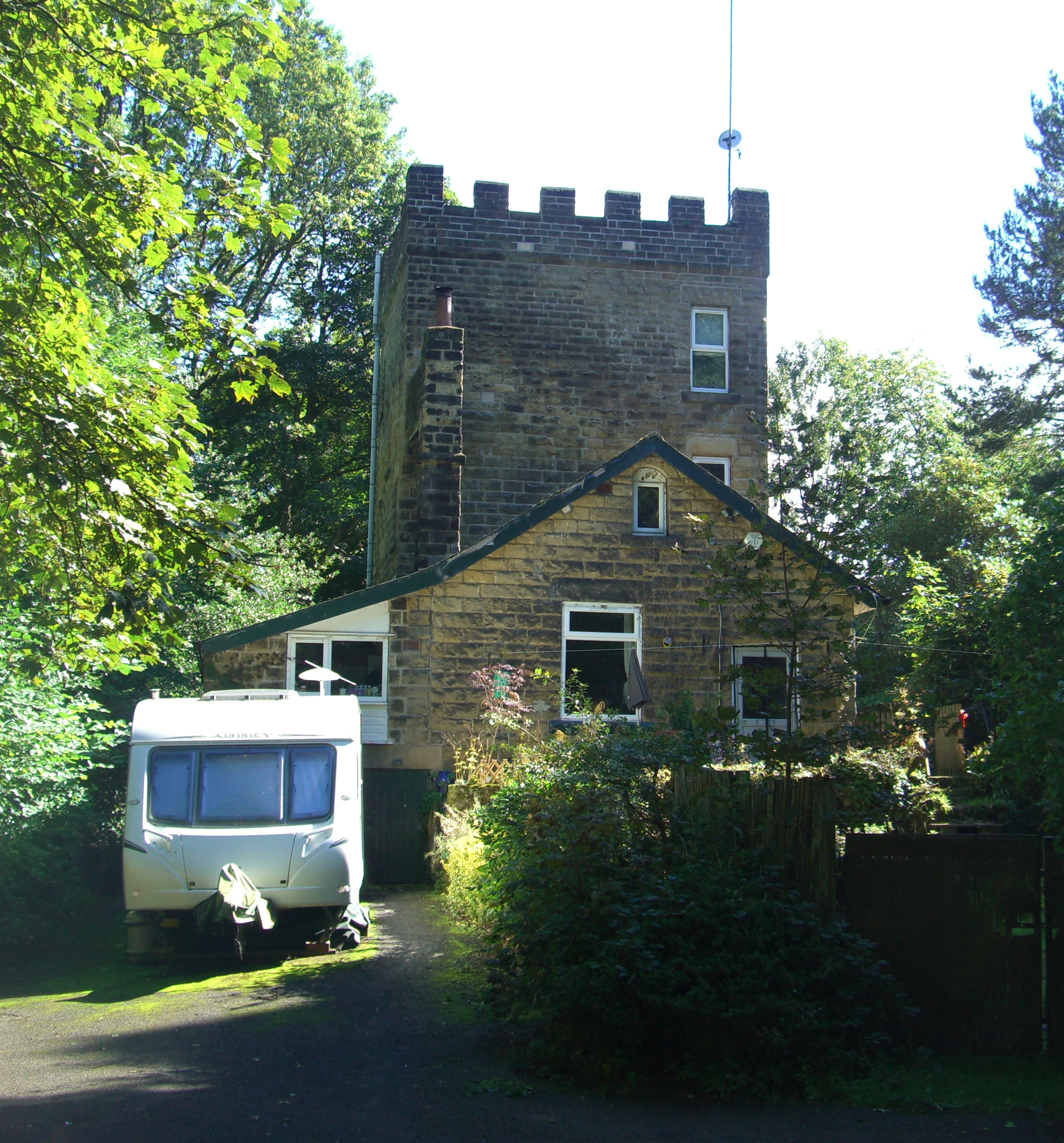
The Tower

Glen Howe Park is a public recreation area in the village of Wharncliffe Side within the City of Sheffield, England. The park covers an area of 19 acres in the valley of the Tinker Brook, a minor tributary of the River Don. It is home to a variety of fungi, rare plants and animals only found in ancient woodlands.

== History ==
The valley of the Tinker Brook first became colonised by trees after the last ice age and has remained wooded ever since. The Tinker Brook and Howe Wood were first mentioned on OS maps in 1855. Glen Howe Park was set up in the valley in 1881 through the patronage of a local businessman, Joseph Dixon, and a landowner and stonemason, John Mills. Dixon was the owner of the nearby Spring Grove paper mill at Oughtibridge and was known as a local benefactor who also provided funds towards the school and workers' housing at Wharncliffe Side. Mills had previously purchased the land on which the park now stands for £1,000. In 1881, he built Glen Howe Tower at the main (western) entrance to the park and lived there until 1917. He was responsible for much of the landscaping of the park, as well as the cascades and ponds in the brook.

In the 1890s, charities such as the Ragged School Union, the Fresh Air Group and local police forces brought groups of poor children from Sheffield's slums to play in the park. In 1913, tennis courts were built in the park on the site of a medieval manor house. The park was gifted to Wortley District Council by Dixon and Mills in 1917. In 1925, a packhorse bridge was dismantled and brought to the park from the Ewden valley. The bridge, which dates from 1734, was going to be inundated by the waters of the Morehall Reservoir which was under construction at the time. Dixon paid for the bridge to be dismantled and moved. It is now a Grade II listed building. In 1971, ownership of the park passed to Sheffield City Council.

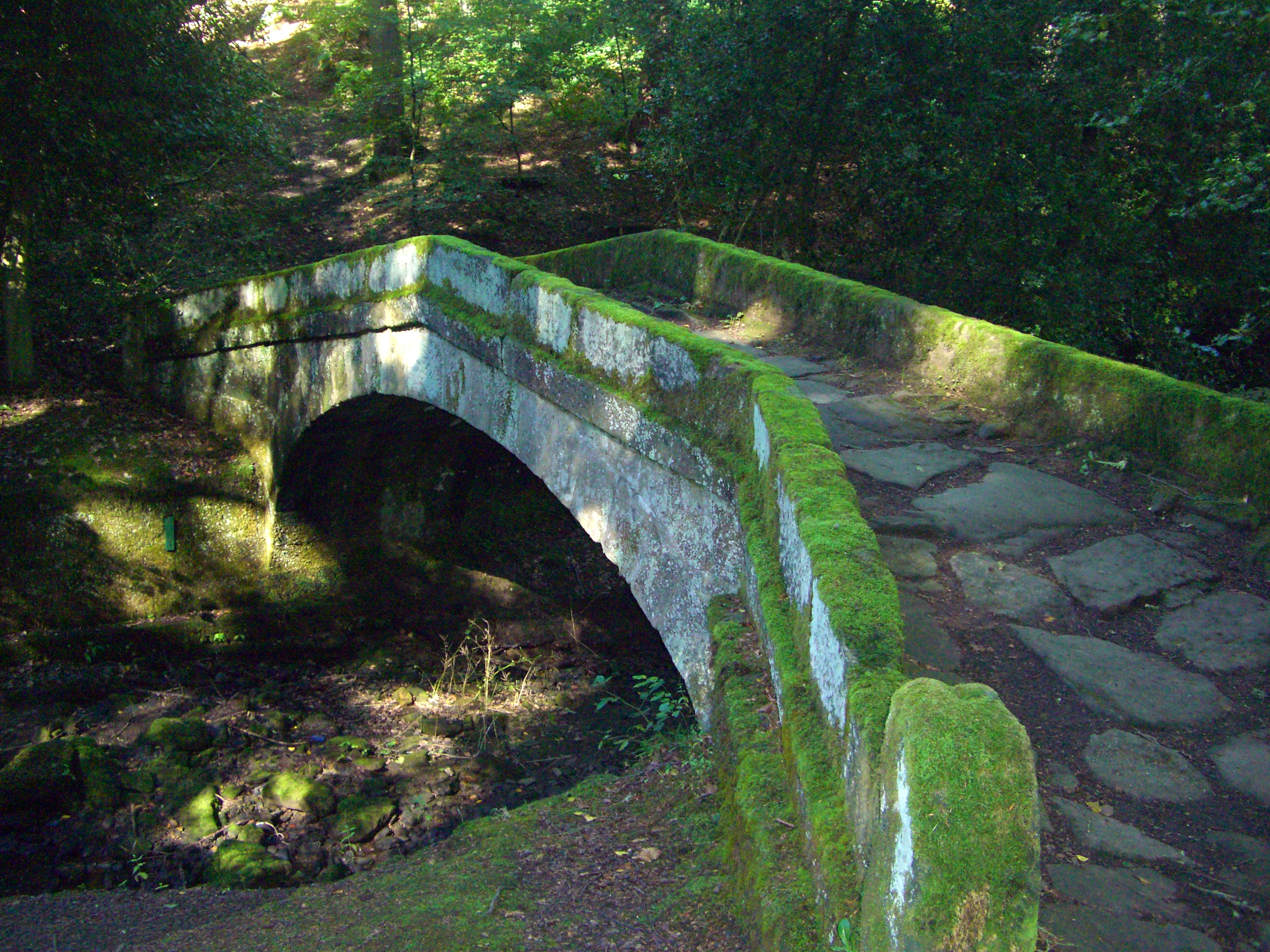
The packhorse bridge

== Features ==
The woodlands of Glen Howe Park are partly natural and partly replanted with exotic species such as rhododendron and azalea. The main native varieties are oak, sycamore, beech and holly. In recent years, the woodland has been managed by the local "Fuelling A Revolution" programme which has thinned out invasive species such as sycamore, Japanese knotweed and rhododendron. A children’s play area and car park stand just outside the main entrance while another area of grassland known as the Top Field lies in the southern part of the park. The recent restoration project has upgraded and repaired many of the paths and the dry stone boundary wall.
