= Wortley baronets =

Extinct baronetcy in the Baronetage of England

The Wortley Baronetcy, of Wortley in the County of York, was a title in the Baronetage of England. It was created on 29 June 1611 for Francis Wortley, who later sat as member of parliament for East Retford and supported the Royalist cause in the Civil War. The title became extinct on the death of the second Baronet in 1665.

The family seat was at Wortley Hall, near Barnsley, Yorkshire.

== Wortley baronets, of Wortley (1611) ==
Escutcheon of the Wortley baronets

- Sir Francis Wortley, 1st Baronet (c. 1592–1652)
- Sir Francis Wortley, 2nd Baronet (died 1665)

Baronetage of England
Preceded by Molyneux baronets	Wortley baronets 29 June 1611	Succeeded by Savile baronets
