= Dragon of Wantley =

Legend of a dragon-slaying by a knight in South Yorkshire

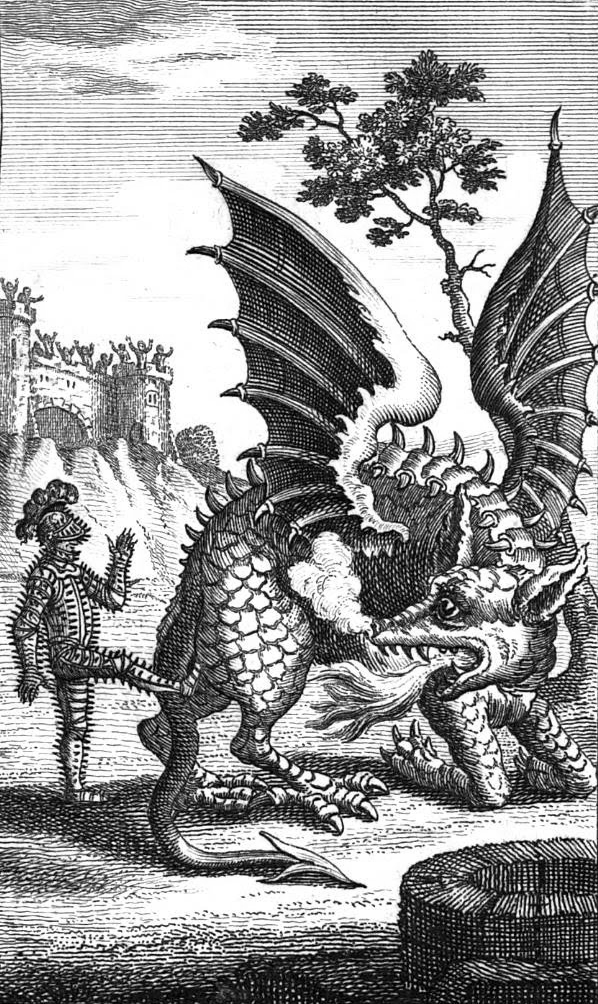
Frontispiece of the libretto for the opera The Dragon of Wantley (1737), published c. 1770.

The Dragon of Wantley is a legend of a dragon-slaying by a knight on Wharncliffe Crags in South Yorkshire, recounted in a comic broadside ballad of 1685. It was later included in Thomas Percy's 1767 Reliques of Ancient English Poetry, enjoying widespread popularity in the 18th and 19th centuries, although less well-known today. In 1737, the ballad was adapted (in English) into one of the more successful operas to appear in London up to that point.

The ballad tells of how a huge dragon – almost as big as the Trojan Horse – devours anything it wishes, even trees and buildings, until the Falstaffian knight Moore of Moore Hall obtains a bespoke suit of spiked Sheffield armour and delivers a fatal kick to the dragon's "arse-gut" – its only vulnerable spot, as the dragon explains with its dying breath.

The topography of the ballad is accurate in its detail as regards Wharncliffe Crags and environs, but the story, and its burlesque humour, has been enjoyed in places far from the landscape from which it appears to derive and has been used to make a number of points unrelated to it.

== Inspirations ==
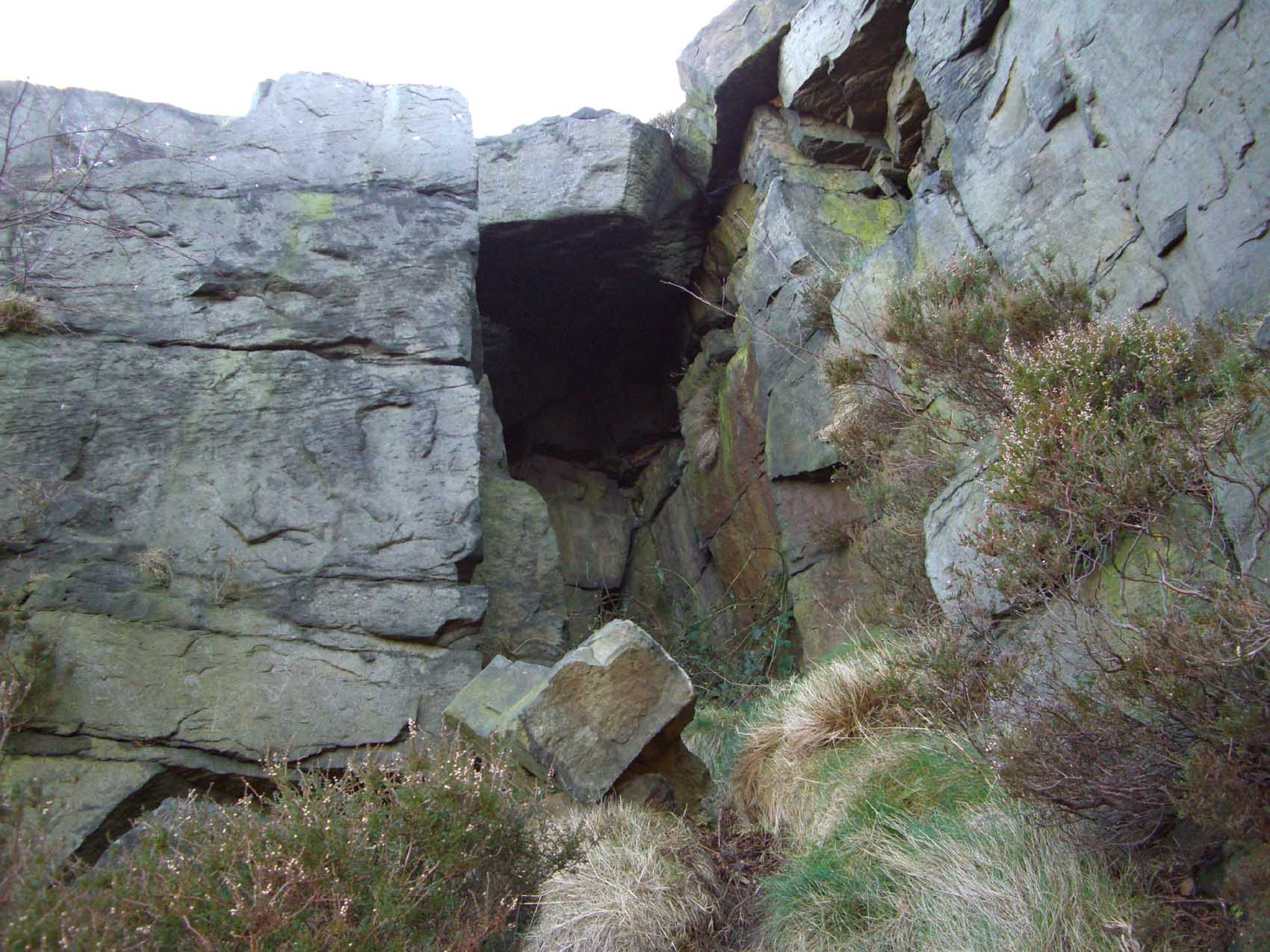
"Dragon's Den" at Wharncliffe Crags in South Yorkshire.

More Hall is a 15th-century (or earlier) residence immediately below the gritstone edge of Wharncliffe Crags—Wharncliffe being formerly known in the local vernacular as Wantley—The dragon was reputed to reside in a den, and to fly across the valley to Allman (Dragon's) Well on the Waldershelf ridge above Deepcar.

One member of the More family of More Hall, George More, was involved in the Throckmorton Plot against Elizabeth I in 1583.

=== The 1573 case ===
A lawsuit was taken out in 1573 by one George More of Sheffield on behalf of the Sheffield Burgery (the 'free men' of Sheffield) against the Lord of the manor of Sheffield, George Talbot, the sixth Earl of Shrewsbury, in respect of his appropriation of the proceeds of Sheffield 'waste' land, which hitherto had paid for Sheffield's poor, civic works and the parish church. This had long been the practice under an agreement in 1297 by one of Talbot's predecessors, one Thomas Furnival, and had seemed secure after a successful petition some two decades previously to the newly enthroned Queen Mary with the full support of George Talbot's father (the previous—fifth—Earl of Shrewsbury, Francis Talbot).

=== Percy's interpretation ===
In his Reliques of Ancient English Poetry Thomas Percy holds that the story of The Dragon of Wantley relates to a dispute over the alleged misappropriation of church tithes in Wharncliffe by Sir Francis Wortley who was opposed by a local lawyer named More.

== Opera parody ==
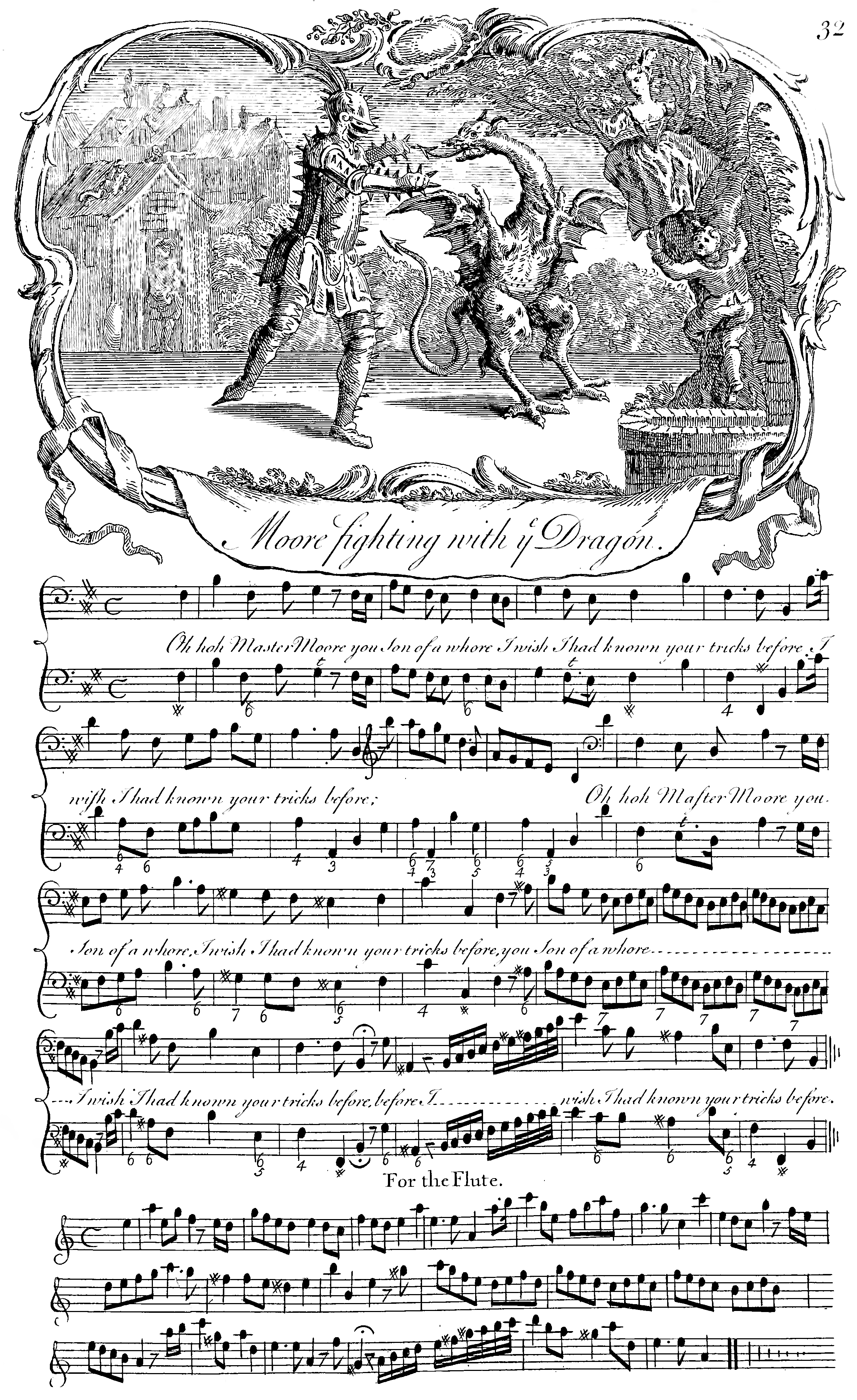
"Moore fighting with ye Dragon" from George Bickham the Younger's The Musical Entertainer

Henry Carey wrote the libretto to a burlesque opera called The Dragon of Wantley in 1737. The opera, with music composed by John Frederick Lampe, punctured the vacuous operatic conventions and pointed a satirical barb at Robert Walpole and his taxation policies. This Augustan parody was a huge success and its initial run was 69 performances in the first season; a number which exceeded even The Beggar's Opera (1728).

The opera debuted at the Haymarket Theatre, where its coded attack on Walpole would have been clear, but its long run occurred after it moved to Covent Garden, which had a much greater capacity for staging. Part of its satire of opera was that all the words were sung, including the recitatives and da capo arias. The play itself is very brief on the page, as it relied extensively on absurd theatrics, dances, and other non-textual entertainments. The Musical Entertainer from 1739 contains engravings showing how the work was performed.

The piece is at once a satire of the ridiculousness of operatic staging and an indirect satire of the government's tax policy. In Carey's play, Moore of Moorehall, "a valiant knight, in love with Margery", is a drunk who pauses to deal with the dragon only between bouts of drinking and carousing with women. Margery offers herself as a human sacrifice to Moore to persuade him to take on the cause of battling the dragon, and she is opposed by Mauxalinda, Moore's "cast-off mistress", who has interest in him now that a rival has appeared.

The battle with the dragon takes place entirely offstage, and Moore only wounds the dragon (who is more reasonable than Moore in his dialogue) in its anus. The main action concerns the lavish dances and songs by the two sopranos and Moore.

The opera is now rarely performed. Isleworth Baroque (now Richmond Opera) have produced two fully-staged productions, in 2012 and 2021. The University of Birmingham also performed the opera as part of their Summer Festival in the Barber Institute of Fine Arts. It was produced for Chicago's Haymarket Opera Company in October 2019 and by the Boston Early Music Festival in 2023 with subsequent performances in Miami and Troy, New York in 2023 followed by European performances in Sweden at the Confidencen and Germany at Musikfest Bremen, both in 2025.

=== Recording ===
John Frederick Lampe: The Dragon of Wantley – Mary Bevan, Catherine Carby, Mark Wilde, John Savournin, The Brook Street Band, John Andrews. Resonus Classics 2022

== The novel ==
A novel, The Dragon of Wantley, was written by Owen Wister, best known as the author of The Virginian, in 1892. Wister described the story as a comic "burlesque" concerning the "true" story of the Dragon. It is a romantic story set at Christmastime in the early 13th century. The book was a surprise success, going through four editions over the next ten years.

== Representations ==
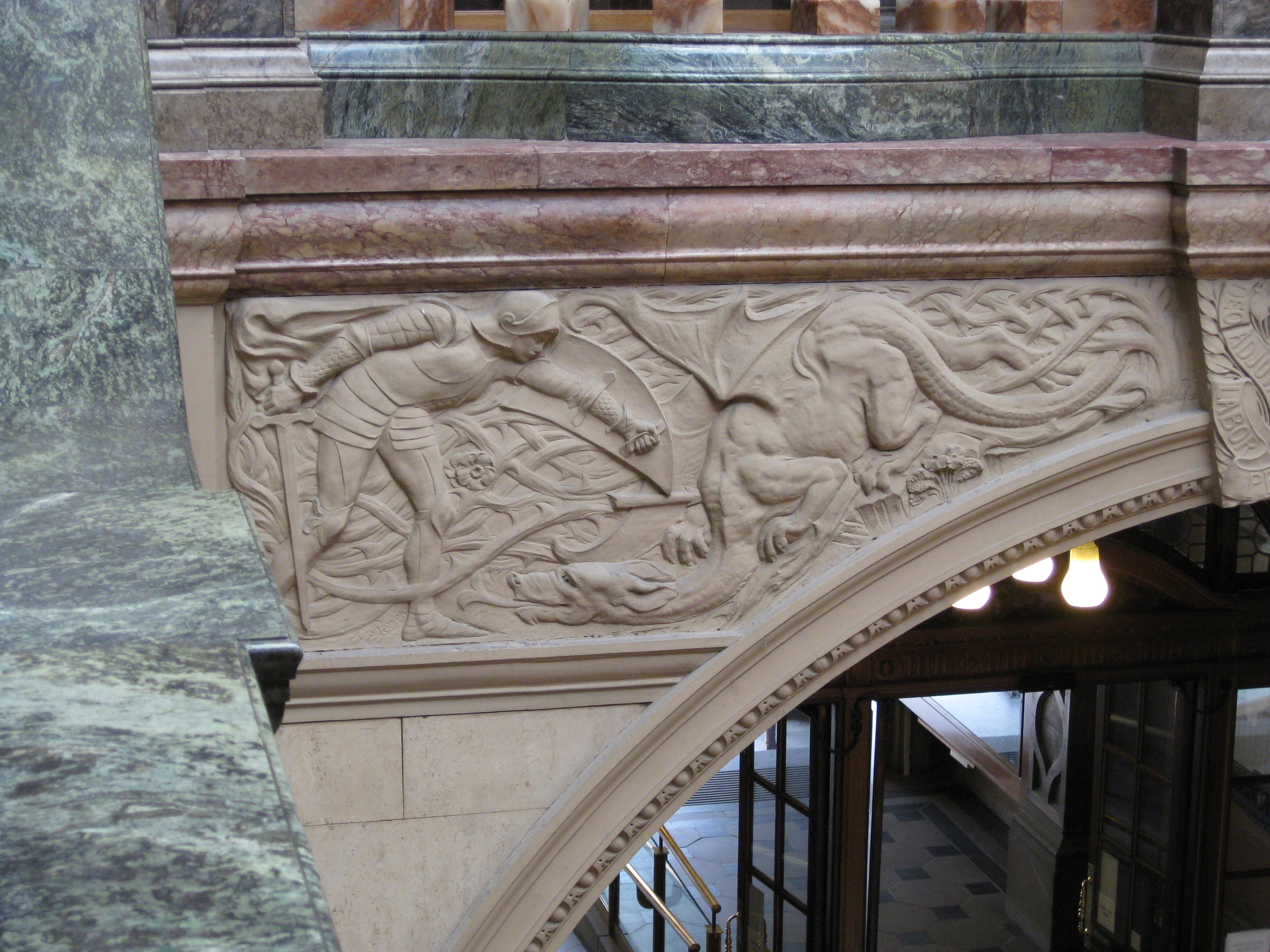
Slaying the Wharncliffe Dragon, Sheffield Town Hall

There is a representation of the dragon above More Hall on the opposite side of the valley to Wharncliffe Crags. The snaking stone wall culminating in a carved dragon's head can be found at the southern edge of Bitholmes Wood (Grid Ref:SK 295 959). There is also a bas-relief frieze of a knight killing a dragon, said to be a representation of More and the Dragon of Wantley, in the entrance hall to Sheffield Town Hall.

== Other references ==
In his Chronicles of Barsetshire novels, Anthony Trollope names an inn and posting house in Barchester The Dragon of Wantley. When it is first mentioned, in The Warden, this pub is owned by John Bold, a local doctor, who is pursuing a dispute with the church authorities over the alleged misapplication of ecclesiastical revenues. The dragon is also mentioned in the first paragraph of the opening chapter of Sir Walter Scott's novel Ivanhoe where Scott writes "In that pleasant district of Merry England which is watered by the River Don, there extended in ancient times a large forest...Here haunted of yore the fabulous Dragon of Wantley." In Chapter XXXVIII of David Copperfield, David writes a letter to Mr. Spenlow in which David "addressed him...as if...he had been an Ogre, or the Dragon of Wantley." In Chapter III of The Railway Children by E. Nesbit, the children name trains after dragons, dubbing one "the Worm of Wantley".

== See also ==
- Lambton Worm
