= Sir Francis Wortley, 1st Baronet =

English poet and politician (1591–1652)

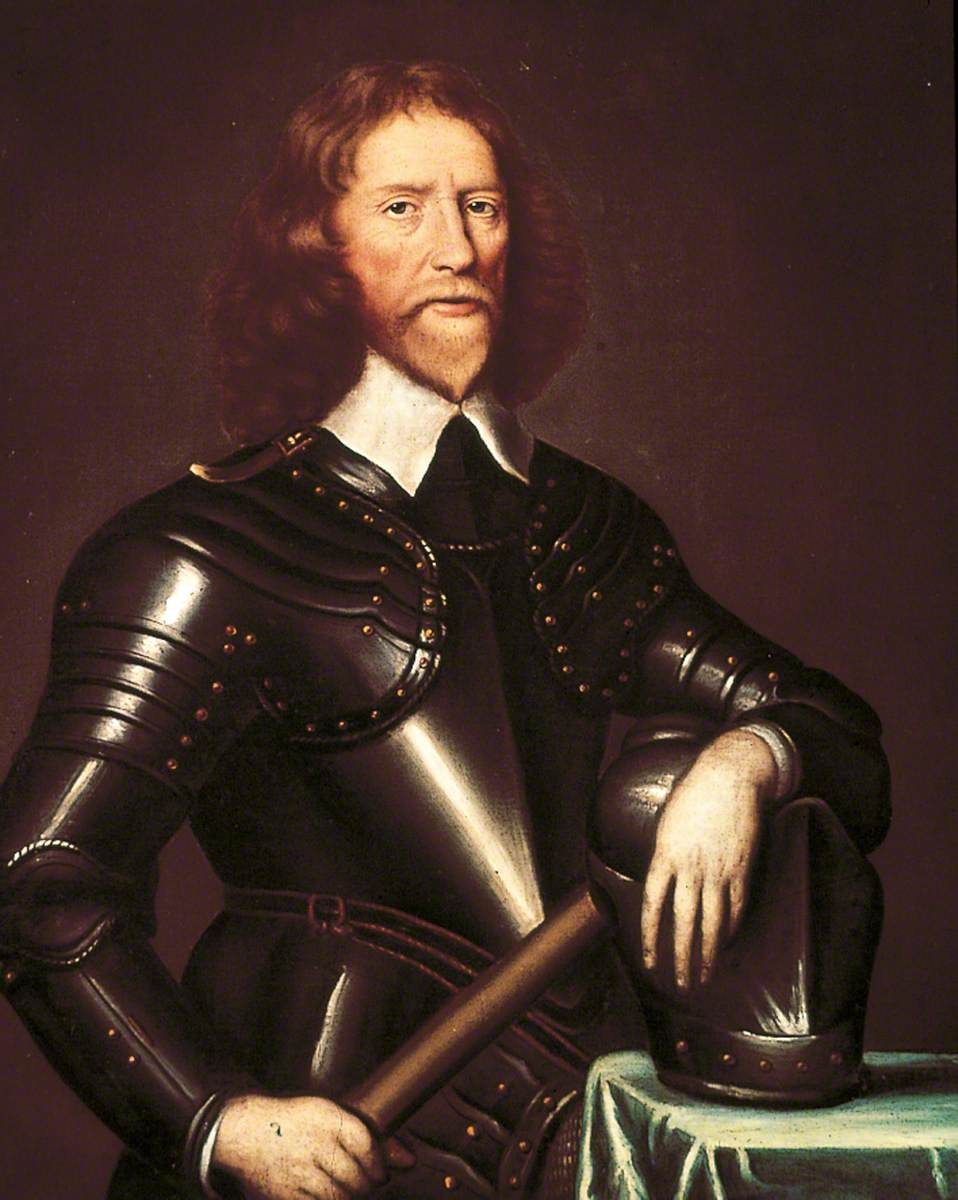

Sir Francis Wortley, 1st Baronet (1591–1652) was an English poet, author and politician who sat in the House of Commons between 1624 and 1626. He supported the Royalist cause in the English Civil War.

== Life ==
Wortley was the son of Sir Richard Wortley, of Wortley Hall, Yorkshire and his wife Elizabeth Boughton daughter of Edward Boughton, of Cawston, Warwickshire. His mother remarried and became after Sir Richard's death the wife of William Cavendish, Earl of Devonshire.

He succeeded his father in the family estates on 25 July 1603. He matriculated at Magdalen College, Oxford on 17 February 1609, aged 17. He was knighted at Theobald's on 15 January 1611 and was created a baronet on 29 June 1611.

=== Member of Parliament (1625-1626) ===
Wortley was admitted to Gray's Inn on 1 August 1624. In 1624, he was elected Member of Parliament for East Retford in the Happy Parliament, on the ticket of Thomas Wentworth (afterwards Earl of Strafford).

He was re-elected MP for East Retford in the 1625 Useless Parliament and in 1626 he sat in the 2nd Parliament of Charles I. He resisted the Benevolence of 1626, having been asked for 30£. There is little documentary evidence that he was one of the over 70 imprisoned by Charles that led to Darnell's Case. In 1626 he duelled on the steps of Parliament with John Savile, 1st Baron Savile of Pontefract.

=== Royalist, blacksmith and cavalier ===
Wortley was a devoted supporter of the Royalist cause during the English Civil War. For instance, he raised a troop of 150 horse and fortified his house at Wortley.

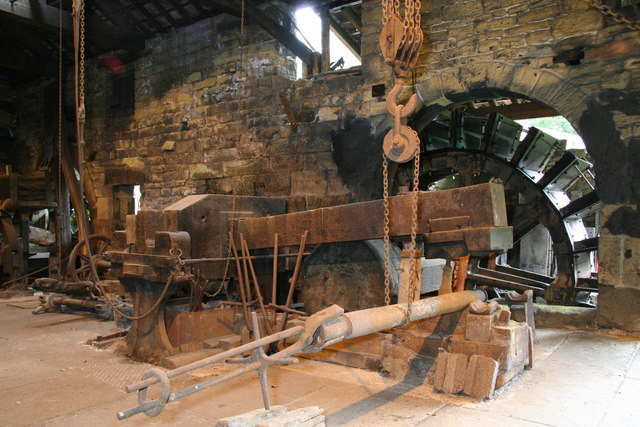
Wortley’s belly helve hammer, water-powered forging hammer

Even a time before, he built the Wortley Top Forge from scratch, with which to arm his King and fellow Cavaliers, and it is for this reason that his portrait lies at the Royal Armouries Museum in Leeds.

At the outbreak of war on 22 August 1642, Wortley was one of four chief baronets chosen to raise the king's standard at Nottingham, effectively beginning the raising of the king's army. Among his activities in the civil war, he went with Charles II to the Siege of Hull (1642).

He was captured in 1644 at Wotton House, near Wakefield and imprisoned in the Tower of London from 1644 to 1648.

His estates were sequestrated and he was fined £500 on 24 April 1647.

=== Death ===
Wortley died in 1653, penniless in the now Commonwealth of England, and directed that he be buried with his father at Windsor.

== Literary works ==
While immured during the Civil War he published Characters and Elegies in 1646, and some other works. He was a friend of Ben Jonson, and contributed to Jonsonus Virbius, in 1638.

== Family ==
Wortley married firstly, Grace Brouncker, daughter of Sir William Brouncker of Melskaham, Wiltshire. He married secondly, after 1623 (her first husband died in 1624), Hester Eyre, widow of Christopher Eyre Alderman of London, and daughter of George Smithes, Alderman and Sheriff of London. He was succeeded in the baronetcy by his son Francis.

Parliament of England
Preceded by Nathaniel Rich; John Holles	Member of Parliament for East Retford; 1624–1626; With: John Holles	Succeeded by Sir Edward Osborne; Sir Henry Stanhope
Baronetage of England
New creation	Baronet (of Wortley); 1611–1652	Succeeded by Francis Wortley
