= Wharncliffe Crags =

Escarpment near Sheffield, South Yorkshire, England

Coordinates: 53.4716°N 1.5506°W

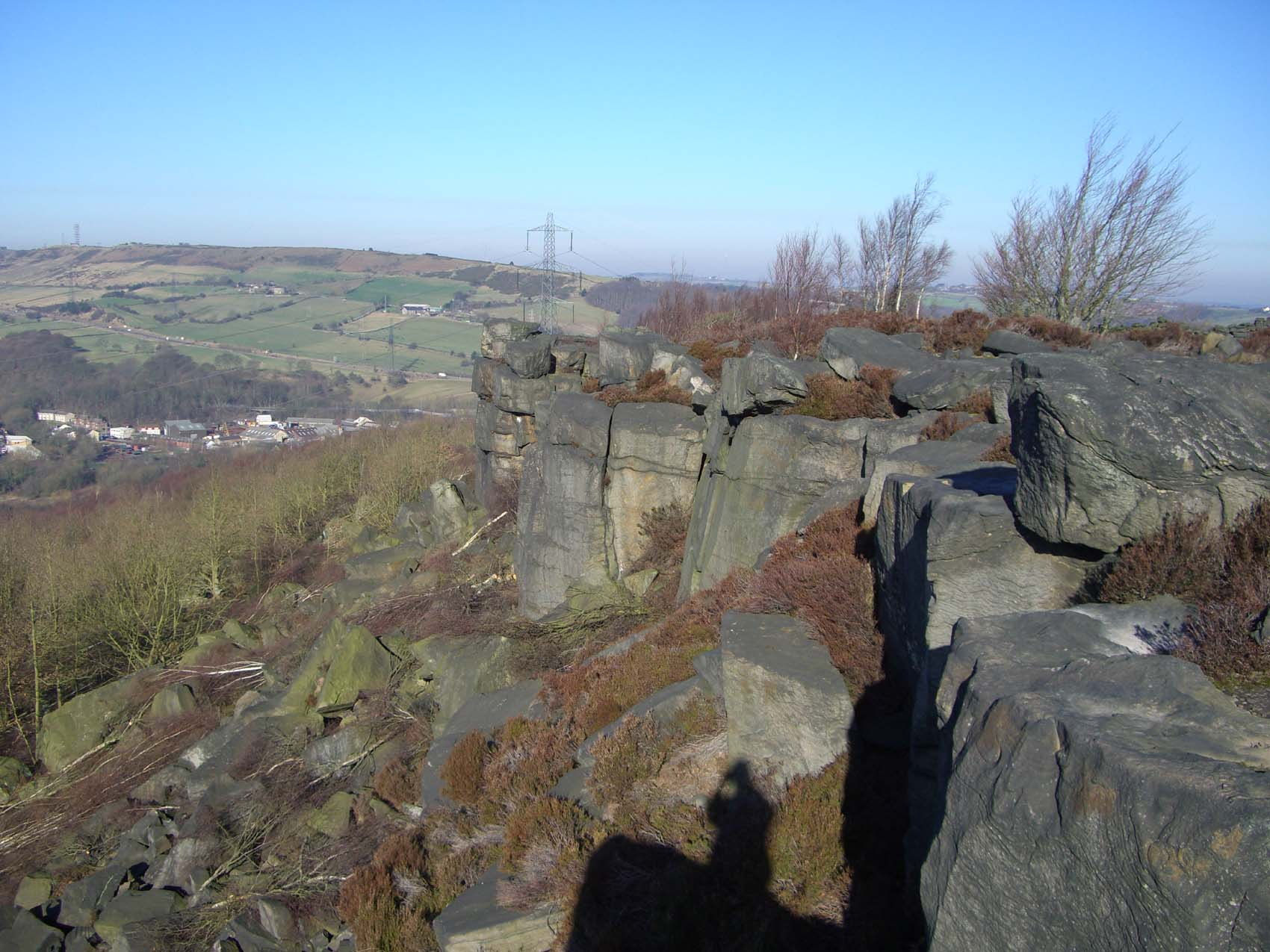
The top of the crags with the Stocksbridge bypass in the background

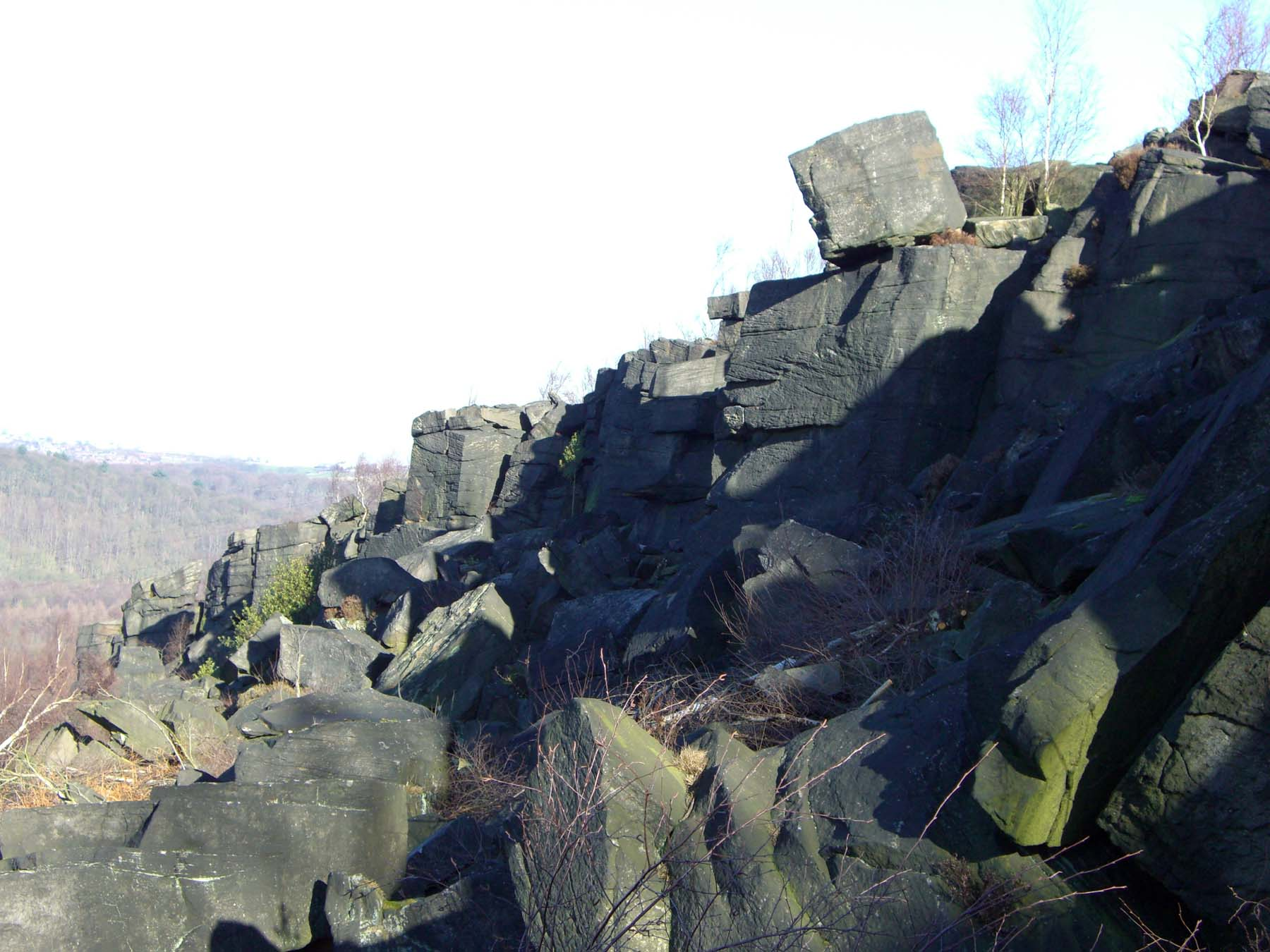
The crags with their many detached boulders

Wharncliffe Crags is a gritstone escarpment or edge situated approximately 6 miles (10 km) north-west of the city of Sheffield in South Yorkshire, England. It is a geological Site of Special Scientific Interest.

== Overview ==
The edge, which is characterised as a steep rock face for much of its 2-mile (4 km) length, runs from grid reference SK295979 just east of the village of Deepcar in a roughly south-easterly direction to grid reference SK305951 just east of Wharncliffe Side. Wharncliffe Crags stand on the eastern side of the upper River Don valley at around 250 metres (820 ft) above sea level, the highest spot height being 297 metres (974 ft). Although set in a pleasant situation, the northern end of the crags are never far away from the buzz of civilisation with the noise of the nearby Stocksbridge bypass and A6102 road ever-present; there are also two lines of electricity pylons, which converge at the northern end of the crags. The rocks of the escarpment were formed 320 million years ago in the Paleozoic era.

== History ==
The rocks at the north-western end of Wharncliffe Crags have been quarried to produce quern-stones as long ago as the Iron Age, continuing into the period of the Roman occupation of Britain. The name Wharncliffe actually evolved from the term "quern cliff". The process of quern production has left behind considerable evidence in the area of the crags, including work flooring and trackways as well as many abandoned querns. In August 1996 an accidental heather fire burned away much of the vegetation over an area of 8 hectares, revealing many more quern-stones than had originally thought present. A survey by English Heritage in 2000 uncovered around 2300 stones in the 8-hectare area, leading to an estimate that there could be around 8000 quern-stones in the quarry area. The area of quern production has been declared a Scheduled Ancient Monument. Wharncliffe Lodge stands at the southern end of the crags and has fine views of the Ewden valley to the west. The present building dates from the 19th century and is the third lodge on the site, the original having been built in 1510. The lodge has strong associations with Lady Mary Wortley Montagu who resided there for short periods in the early 18th century. The floor of one of the rooms bears the inscription of Henry VIII's reign (1509–1547).

== Geology and habitat ==
The geology of Wharncliffe Crags led to the area being designated a Site of Special Scientific Interest in 1988. The geological features of the cliff face are of special interest, showing the best available exposed example of the Wharncliffe Edge Rock Formation within the Pennines and two primary sandstone beds that were originally laid down as sediments from a meandering river. The downslope from the base of the cliff towards the Don valley is covered by the birch and oak woodland of Wharncliffe Woods, which are owned by the Forestry Commission. The flat ground on the top of the crags is mostly carpeted with heather. The level terrain behind the central part of the crags is known as Wharncliffe Chase; this was part of a royal hunting park in the Middle Ages. More recently the chase was mined for ganister, which was used to produce furnace bricks for the local steel industry; there has also been small-scale coal mining in the past.

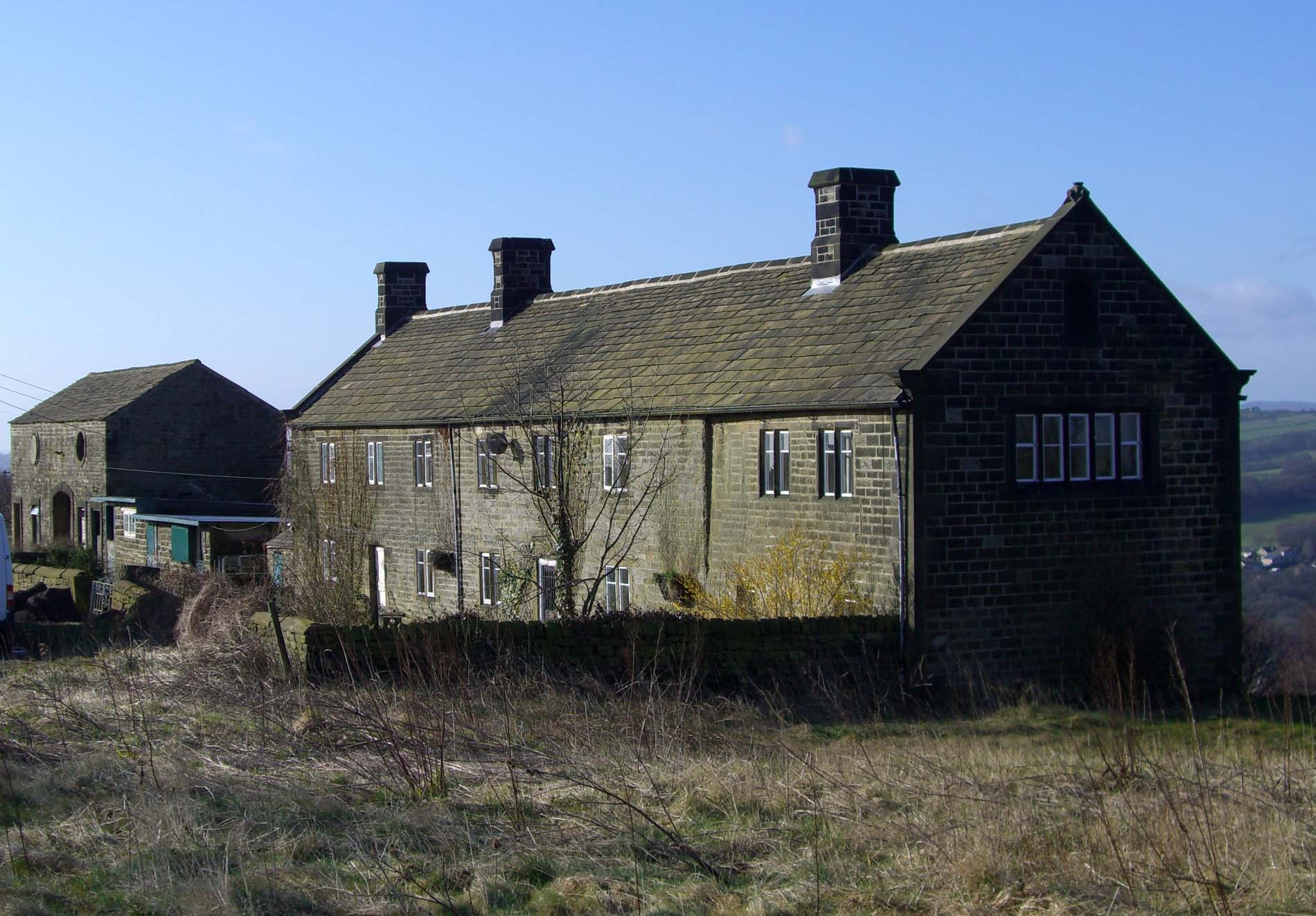
Wharncliffe Lodge

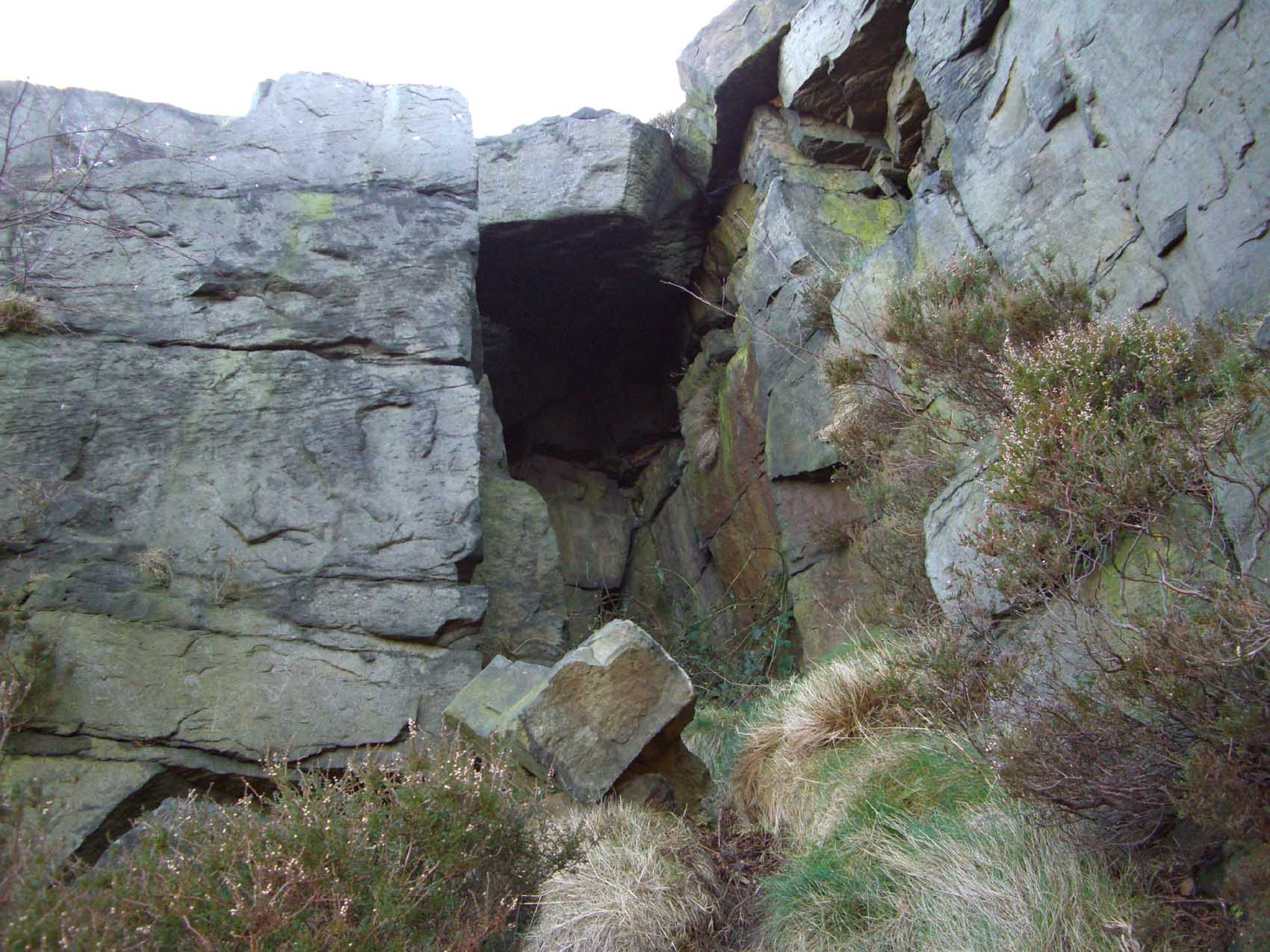
The so-called "Dragon's Den" cave at the southern end of the crags

== Wharncliffe Heath Local Nature Reserve ==
The north-western (Deepcar) end of the crags stand within the Wharncliffe Heath Local Nature Reserve an area of heather, bracken, birch scrub and broad-leaved woodland that provides a home for a rich diversity of wildlife. These include rare and threatened species, such as nightjar, linnet, viviparous lizard and green tiger beetle. The reserve is one of the best examples of dry heath in the Sheffield area. It differs from the nearby Peak District heather moorland in that it is a mosaic of heather, scrub and bracken. The reserve is managed by the Wharncliffe Heathlands Trust, whose main recent projects have been keeping birch scrub under control by felling and wood pasture creation.

== Rock climbing ==
Wharncliffe Crags has a long history of rock climbing: it was at the forefront at the birth of the sport in the UK in the 1880s. Pre-World War I climbing legend J. W. Puttrell was a regular visitor to the crags from 1885 onwards and pioneered many early routes, most notably Puttrell's Progress which had its first ascent around 1900. By 1900 the crag was the most popular climbing venue in the country, a fact that was helped by the presence of the nearby Deepcar railway station on the Sheffield to Manchester railway line. The crag declined in popularity, losing out to more popular venues in the Peak District, and is now a quiet site. There are around 142 traditional climbs on the crag along with many bouldering climbs on the numerous large boulders that have become detached from the main crag.

== Legend ==
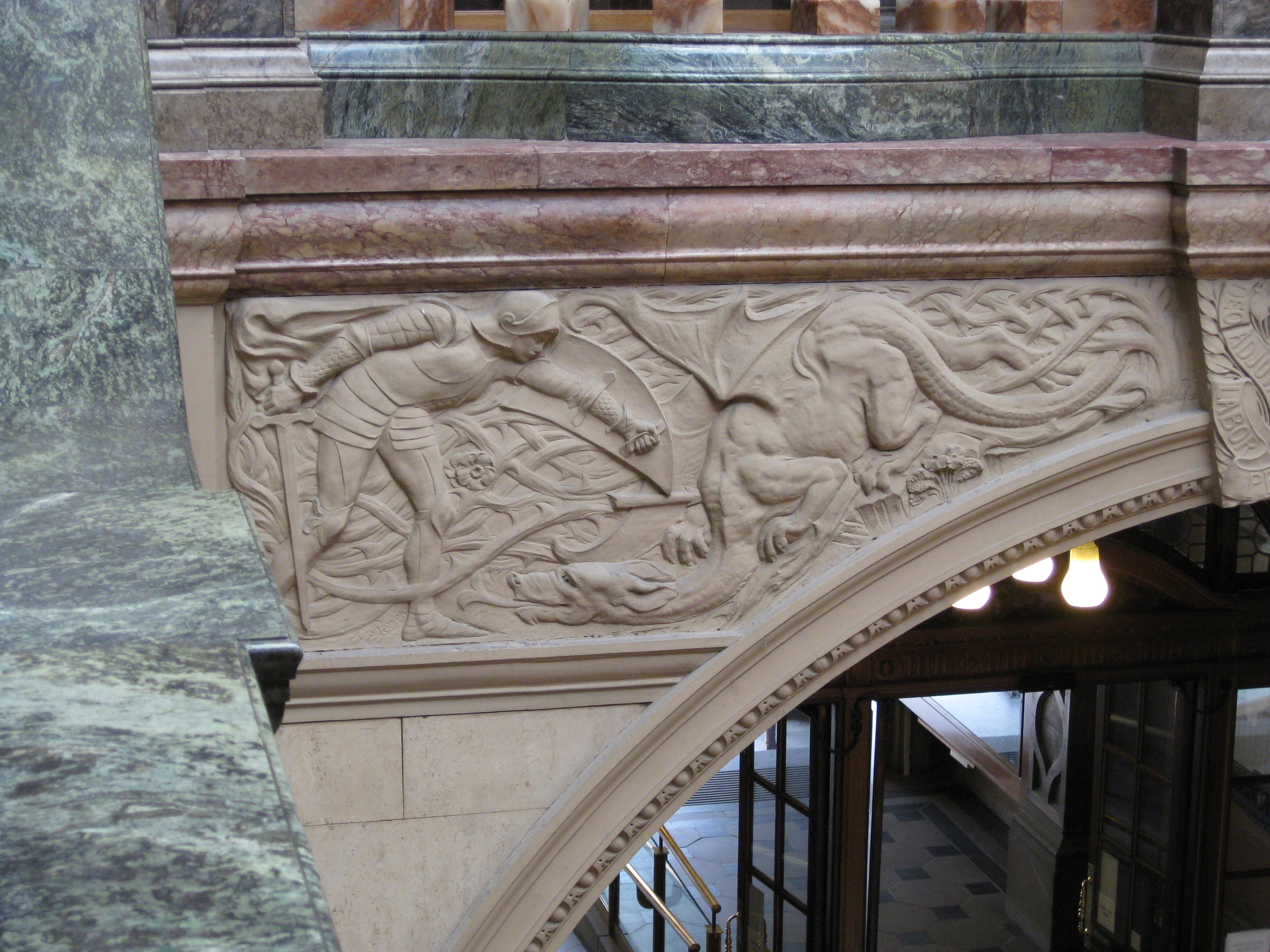
Slaying the Wharncliffe Dragon, Sheffield Town Hall

The crags are also the venue of the legend of the Dragon of Wantley, a myth that was made into a 17th-century satirical poem and an opera by Henry Carey. The legend was mentioned by Sir Walter Scott in the opening chapter of Ivanhoe: "Here haunted of yore the fabulous Dragon of Wantley". The story tells the tale of how More, of More Hall, slays a troublesome dragon that lives on the crags. A cave at the southern end of the crags, close to Wharncliffe Lodge, is called the Dragon's Den and is thus marked on maps.

== See also ==
- Wharncliffe Side, village in the river valley, south of the crags
